= Apple Watch =

Line of smartwatches

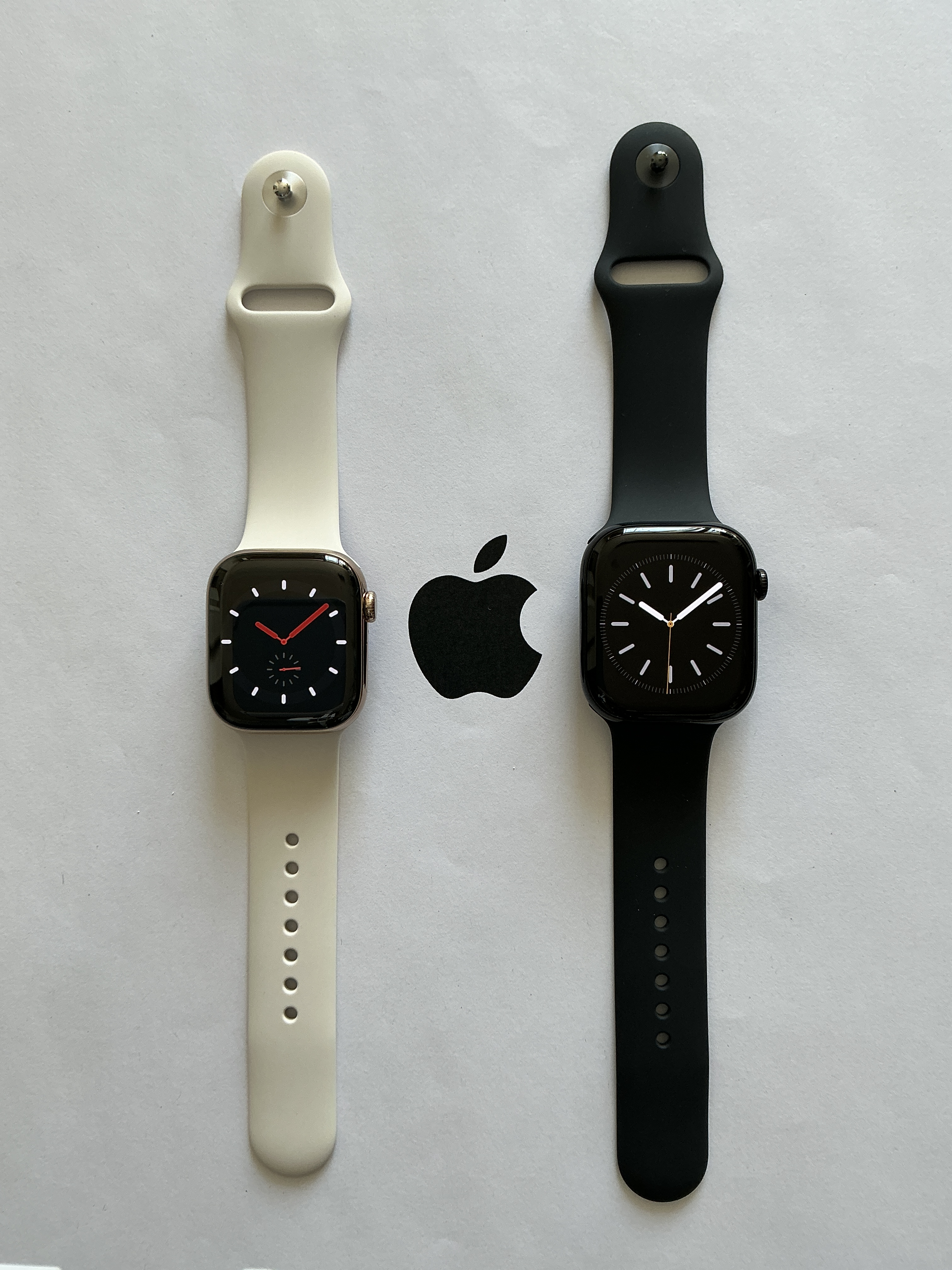
- Apple Watch Series 10
- Developer: Apple
- Manufacturer: Contract manufacturers: Quanta Computer; Compal Electronics
- Type: Smartwatch
- Released: April 24, 2015; 11 years ago
- Units sold: 267.6 million (estimated, 2023)
- Operating system: watchOS
- Display: Retina display with OLED
- Connectivity: Wi-Fi 802.11 b/g/n; Bluetooth; NFC; GPS
- Power: Built-in rechargeable lithium-ion battery
- Backward compatibility: iPhone with the latest iOS
- Website: apple.com/watch

The Apple Watch is a line of smartwatches developed and marketed by Apple. It has fitness tracking, health-oriented capabilities, and wireless telecommunication, integrating with watchOS and other Apple products and services. The first Apple Watch was released in April 2015, and quickly became the world's best-selling wearable device. 4.2 million were sold in the second quarter of fiscal 2015, and more than 115 million people were estimated to use an Apple Watch as of December 2022. Apple has introduced a new generation of the Apple Watch with improved internal components each September – each labeled by Apple as a 'Series', with certain exceptions. (Note: In September 2016, the second generation of Apple Watch was divided into two Series, the Series 2 and the budget Series 1, with different internal components. In September 2020, the sixth generation of Apple Watch was divided into the Series 6 and the budget SE, also carrying different internal components. In September 2022, the eighth generation of Apple Watch was divided into the Series 8, the updated second generation of the budget SE, and the Ultra, again each with different internal components, and also with different external appearances. For convenience, this article treats each SE generation and the Ultra as the equivalent of a numbered Series.)

Each Series has been initially sold in multiple variants defined by the watch casing's material, color, and size (except for the budget watches Series 1 and SE, available only in aluminum, and the Ultra, available only in 49 mm titanium), and beginning with the Series 3 and Series 11, by the option in the aluminum variants for LTE and 5G cellular connectivity, respectively, which comes standard with the other materials. The band included with the watch can be selected from multiple options from Apple, and watch variants in aluminum co-branded with Nike and in stainless steel co-branded with Hermès are also offered, which include exclusive bands and watchfaces.

The Apple Watch operates in conjunction with the user's iPhone for functions such as configuring the watch and syncing data with iPhone apps, but can separately connect to a Wi-Fi network for data-reliant purposes, including communications, app use, and audio streaming. LTE and 5G-equipped models can also perform these functions over a mobile network, and can make and receive phone calls independently when the paired iPhone is not nearby or is powered off. (Note: Except for the initial configuration, a "Family Setup" option removes the need for an iPhone altogether, although fewer features are supported.) The Apple Watch uses proprietary, hidden APIs to interface, sync, and integrate with the iPhone that are not accessible to third-party smartwatches, limiting their functionality.

The oldest iPhone model that is compatible with any given Apple Watch depends on the version of the operating system installed on each device. As of September 2026, new Apple Watches come with watchOS 27 preinstalled and require an iPhone running iOS 27, which is compatible with the iPhone 11 or later.

== Development ==
Apple design chief Jony Ive became interested in building a watch shortly after Steve Jobs' death in October 2011. That December, The New York Times reported that Apple was exploring various ideas, including a "curved-glass iPod that would wrap around the wrist", which users would interact with through the Siri voice assistant, and which "could relay information back to the iPhone". In February 2013, The New York Times and The Wall Street Journal again confirmed that Apple was working on a smartwatch with a curved display, and Bloomberg News said the team had grown to about 100 designers.

In March 2013, Apple hired former Adobe chief technology officer Kevin Lynch, reporting to Bob Mansfield, to lead the watch project, which would become the company's first major new product without input from late co-founder Steve Jobs. Apple started the project without specific use cases in mind, not knowing what problems the watch would solve, but felt that "technology was going to move onto the body", according to Alan Dye, who was in charge of its user interface. According to Lynch, the team felt people spent too much time on their phone, nagged by notifications, and a watch would provide "that level of engagement [...] in a way that's a little more human, a little more at the moment when you're with somebody".

In July 2013, the Financial Times reported that Apple had begun hiring more employees to work on the smartwatch, and that it was targeting a retail release in late 2014.

The software evolved more quickly than the hardware. To test it, the team created a prototype, an iPhone strapped to the wrist with Velcro, which showed the Apple watch software in its true size and an onscreen watch crown for input. The crown was later turned into a physical dongle plugged into the headphone jack. Early on, the user interface and bundled apps were inspired by the iPhone, but they were too complex and underwent three rounds of redesign to avoid awkwardly long interactions that would annoy users. The team worked on notification vibrations and sounds for more than a year, attempting to make them reflect the nature of different notifications. They also added a way to show a contextual menu by pressing the display more deeply, called Force Touch. In contrast with Apple's usually narrow design options, the team thought a watch would need to appeal to users' diverse tastes in fashion, so they opted to give a choice of bands, models (like the 18-karat gold Apple Watch Edition), and watch faces.

== Unveiling and release ==
In April 2014, Apple CEO Tim Cook told The Wall Street Journal that the company was planning to launch new products that year, but revealed no specifics.

In June 2014, Reuters reported that production of a smartwatch product was expected to begin in July for an October release.

During a September 2014 press event where the iPhone 6 was also presented, the new watch product was introduced by Tim Cook's "one more thing" section. After a video focusing on the design process, Cook reappeared on stage wearing an Apple Watch.

In comparison to other Apple products and competing smartwatches, marketing of the Apple Watch promoted the device as a fashion accessory. Apple later focused on its health and fitness-oriented features, in an effort to compete with dedicated activity trackers. The watchOS 3 added fitness tracking for wheelchair users, social sharing in the Activity app, and a Breathe app to facilitate mindfulness.

The device was not branded as "iWatch", which would have put it in line with its product lines such as iPod, iPhone, and iPad. In the United States, the "iWatch" trademark is owned by OMG Electronics – who was crowdfunding a device under the same name; it is owned in the European Union by Irish firm Probendi. In July 2015, Probendi sued Apple Inc. for trademark infringement, arguing that through keyword advertising on the Google search engine, it caused advertising for the Apple Watch to appear on search results pages when users searched for the trademarked term "iWatch".

=== Release ===
Pre-orders for the Apple Watch began on April 10, 2015, with the official release on April 24. Initially, it was not available at the Apple Store; customers could make appointments for demonstrations and fitting, but the device was not in-stock for walk-in purchases and had to be reserved and ordered online. CNET felt that this distribution model was designed to prevent Apple Store locations from having long lineups due to the high demand. The first ever retail store to display the Apple Watch to the public was Colette in Paris. Later on, selected models were available in limited quantities at luxury boutiques and authorized resellers.

On June 4, 2015, Apple announced that it planned to stock Apple Watch models at its retail locations.

On August 24, 2015, Best Buy announced that it would begin stocking the Apple Watch at its retail stores by the end of September. Both T-Mobile US and Sprint also announced plans to offer Apple Watch through their retail stores.

In September 2015, Apple launched a new subset of the Apple Watch, with a stainless steel body and leather band, in collaboration with Hermès. The following year, Apple launched another subset of Apple Watches in collaboration with Nike dubbed "Apple Watch Nike+". Both subsets featured cosmetic customization, but otherwise functioned like standard Apple Watches.

The Apple Watch went on sale in India in November 2015. The device also launched in Chile, the Philippines, Indonesia, and South Africa.

== Hardware ==
=== Design and materials ===
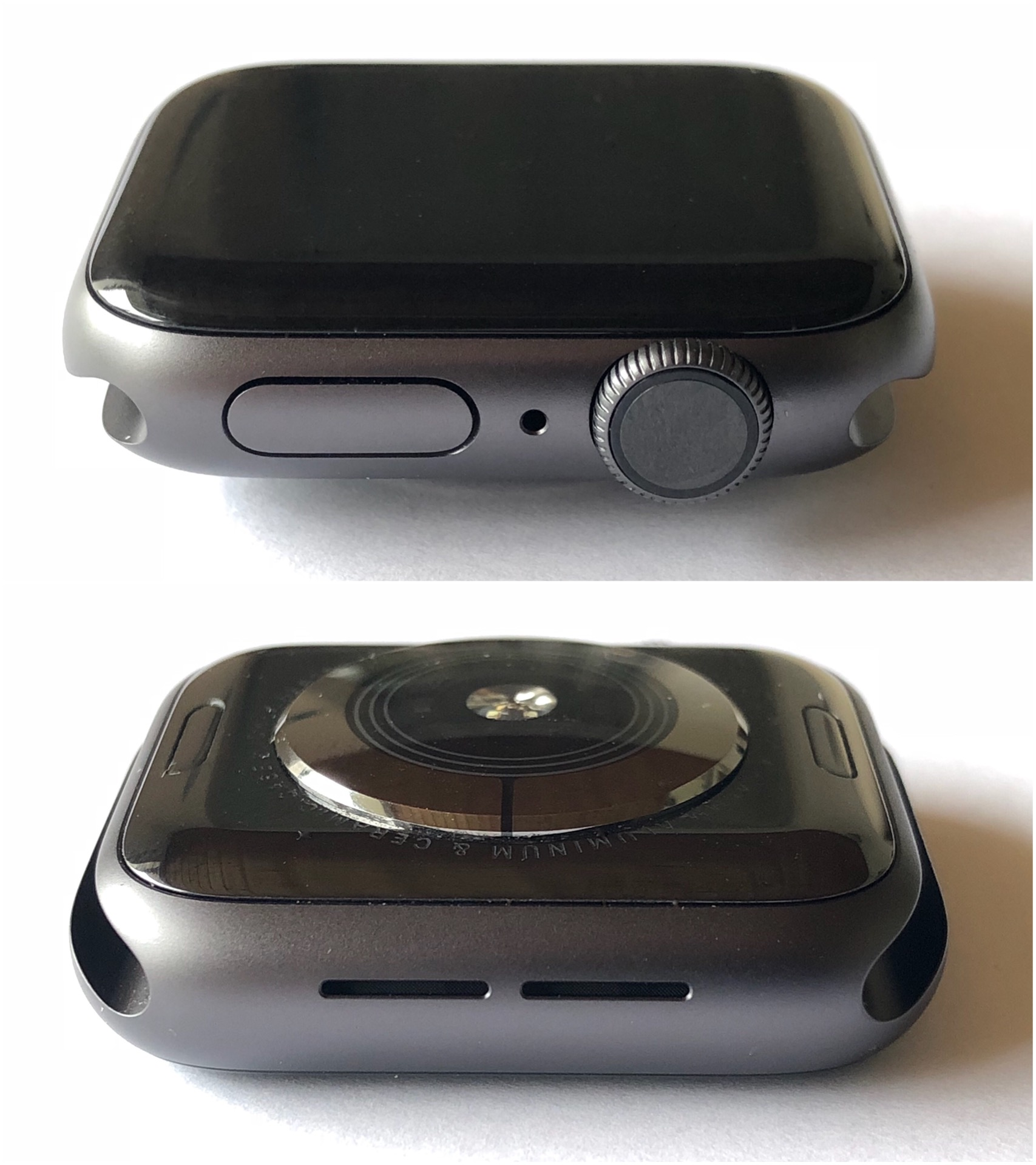
Series 4 (40 mm, aluminum, Space Gray color)

Each Series of the Apple Watch is offered in multiple variants, distinguished by the casing's material, color, and size, with special bands and digital watch faces available for certain variants co-branded with Nike and Hermès, which are also sometimes accompanied by other unique extras, like stainless steel charging pucks, premium packaging, and exclusive color basic bands.

Originally at launch, the Apple Watch was marketed as one of three "collections", designating the case material. In order of increasing cost, the collections were:

- Apple Watch Sport (aluminum case)
- Apple Watch (stainless-steel case)
- Apple Watch Edition (originally released as an 18kt gold casing with newer materials in later models)

Starting with Series 1/Series 2, Apple dropped the "Sport" moniker from the branding (apart from the sport bands), and the Apple Watch was available with either an aluminum (lowest cost) or stainless steel case. "Apple Watch Edition" branding still exists, but now refers to watch casings made from ceramic or titanium.

Apple did not explicitly market the first-generation Apple Watch as being waterproof, stating that it can withstand splashes of water (such as rain and hand washing), but does not recommend submersion (IPX7). Apple introduced a higher level of water resistance with the release of the Apple Watch Series 2, and the device was explicitly advertised as being suitable for swimming and surfing. The Series 7 also includes an IP6X certification for dust resistance.

=== Size ===
Since the introduction of the Apple Watch, it has been available in two sizes (the Apple Watch Ultra being the exception), primarily affecting screen resolution and area. The smaller size at launch was 38 mm (1.5 in), referring to the approximate height of the watch case; the larger size was 42 mm (1.7 in). Starting with the Series 4, the two nominal sizes changed to 40 and 44 mm (1.6 and 1.7 in). The nominal sizes changed again with the introduction of the Series 7: 41 and 45 mm (1.6 and 1.8 in); and yet again in 2024 with the launch of the Series 10 at 42 and 46 mm (1.7 and 1.8 in).

The overall shape and width of the watch have not changed significantly since its release, so customizable bands and accessories are typically compatible with any Apple Watch of the same size class. Bands that fit the smaller size class (38, 40, 41 and 42 mm (1.5, 1.6, 1.6 and 1.7 in) watches) and larger size class (42, 44, 45 and 46 mm (1.7, 1.7, 1.8 and 1.8 in) watches) are generally interchangeable within the class. The casing of the watch includes a mechanism to allow the user to change the straps without special tools.

=== Input and sensors ===
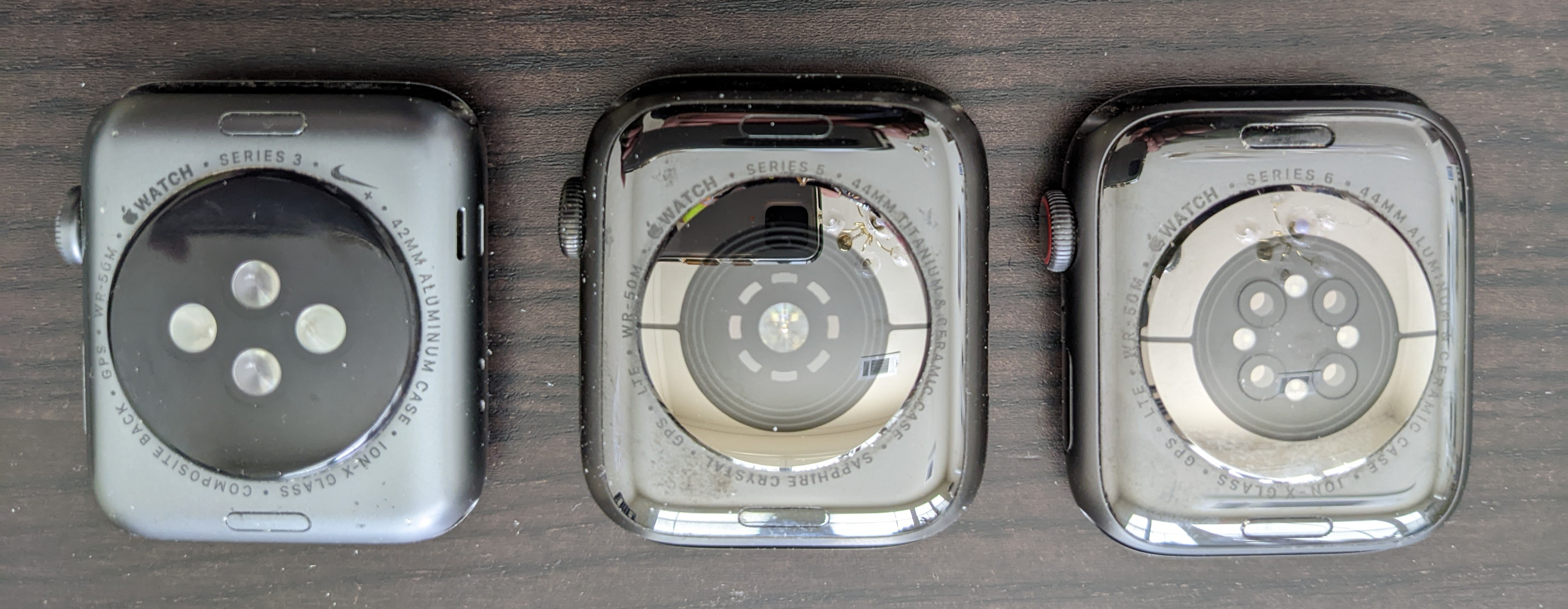
Underside of three Apple Watches, showing the digital crown and updates to the back sensors; L–R: Series 3, 5, and 6

For input, the Apple Watch features a "digital crown" on one side, which can be turned to scroll or zoom content on screen, and pressed to return to the home screen or display recently used apps. Next to the crown (on the same side of the watch) is the Side Button, which can be used to access Control Center and the contactless payment service Apple Pay. The Apple Watch also prominently features a touchscreen; before Series 6/SE, the screen included Force Touch technology, which enabled the display to become pressure-sensitive and therefore capable of distinguishing between a tap and a press for displaying contextual menus. Force Touch has since been physically removed in Watch Series 6 and Watch SE, and has been disabled via software on the Series 5 and earlier on models supporting watchOS 7.

Additional sensors integrated into the Apple Watch include an accelerometer, gyroscope, and barometer, which are used to determine device orientation, user movement, and altitude. The back of all Apple Watches are equipped with a Heart Rate Monitor, which projects infrared and green light from light-emitting diodes (LEDs) onto the user's skin and photodiodes measure the varying amount of light reflected. Because blood absorbs green light and reflects red light, the amounts of each type of reflected light are compared to determine heart rate. The Apple Watch adjusts the sampling rate and LED brightness as needed. Starting with the Series 4, Apple added electrical sensors to the Digital Crown and back, allowing the Apple Watch to take electrocardiogram (ECG) readings; the device won FDA clearance in October 2018, becoming the first consumer device capable of taking an ECG. A blood oxygen monitor was added with the Series 6 in 2020, albeit as a "wellness" device not capable of diagnosing a medical condition. The blood oxygen monitor added red LEDs to the back, allowing the watch to determine oxygen levels by measuring blood color. The Apple Watch SE reverted to the capabilities of the Series 3, dropping the electrical sensors and blood oxygen monitor.

=== Battery ===
Apple rates the device's battery for 18 hours of mixed usage. The Apple Watch is charged by means of inductive charging. If the watch's battery depletes to less than 10 percent, the user is alerted and offered to enable Low Power Mode, which allows the user to continue to use the watch while some features are disabled. The watch then reverts to its original mode when the battery is sufficiently charged.

=== Chargers ===
The Magnetic Charging Cable with a USB-A connector was introduced in 2015 alongside the first generation Apple Watch. A USB-C version was released in 2018. Alongside the release of the Series 7 in 2021, Apple released the USB-C Magnetic Fast Charger which charges Series 7 and later models 33% faster than the previous charger. All Ultra models and the SE 3 also support fast charging. The Series 10 and later and the Ultra 3 and later support faster charging by using a redesigned metal back and larger charging coil. With the release of the Series 12 and Ultra 4 in 2026, Apple released an updated USB-C Magnetic Fast Charger which adds additional battery life with 15 minutes of charging, but maintains the same estimated 0-80% charge time.

The Apple Watch Magnetic Charging Dock and the MagSafe Duo use the same charging module as the USB-A Magnetic Charging Cable. Third party accessories licensed through Apple's MFi Program use a charging module produced by Apple, and have been required to use the 2021 Magnetic Fast Charger since 2023. Apple states that non-certified chargers can reduce the battery's lifespan.

Charger	Connector	Maximum charging speed	Fast-charge capable models	0-80% charge time
Magnetic Charging Cable/Magnetic Charger	USB-A; USB-C	Not specified	N/A	1–1.5 hours (First generation and later)
Magnetic Fast Charger (2021)	USB-C	5 W	Series 7 and later Ultra (all models); SE 3	30 minutes (Series 10 and later); 45 minutes (Series 7 through Series 9, Ultra 3 and later, SE 3); 1 hour (Ultra, Ultra 2)
Magnetic Fast Charger (2026)	USB-C	10 W	Series 12; Ultra 4	30 minutes (Series 10 and later); 45 minutes (Series 7 through Series 9, Ultra 3 and later, SE 3); 1 hour (Ultra, Ultra 2)

=== Bands ===
The Apple Watch comes with an included band (strap) to attach it to the user's wrist. The proprietary band attachment mechanism allows swapping models by holding down the connectors on the bottom of the watch and sliding the band pieces out. Apple produces bands in a variety of materials and colors; however, third-party bands are still compatible when using Apple's design guidelines. Bands designed for the original Series 1–3 38 mm and 42 mm case sizes are compatible with the Series 4–6 40 mm and 44 mm cases, as well as the Series 7 41 mm and 45 mm cases, respectively.

Starting with the Apple Watch Series 5, Apple introduced the online Apple Watch Studio, which allows customers to mix and match bands on purchase, eliminating the need to purchase a specific combination of case and band design, and allowing for a simplification of packaging (since the Apple Watch Series 4 in 2018).

== Models ==
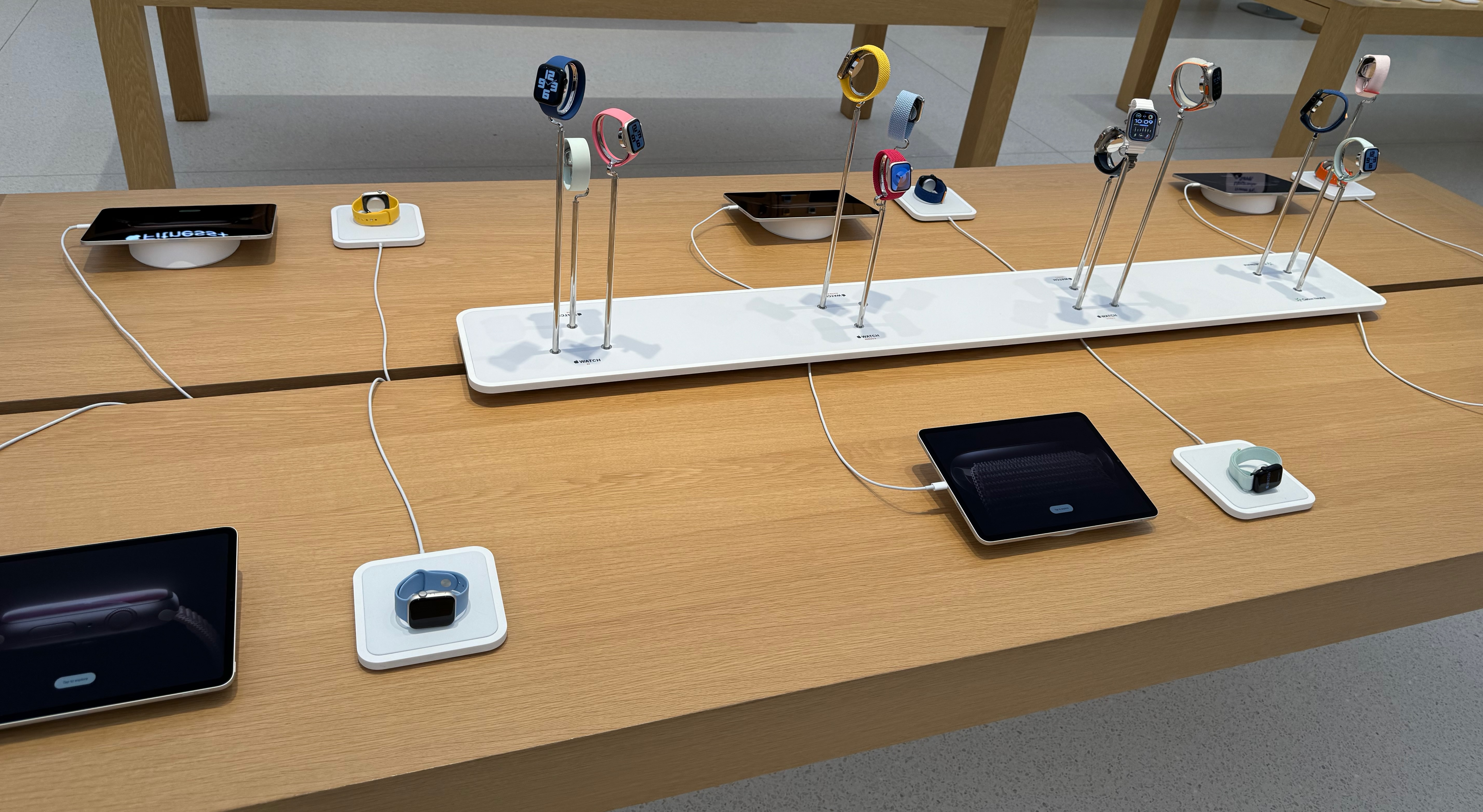
An Apple Watch "Discovery" table at an Apple Store

Apple Watch models have been divided into five "collections": Apple Watch (1st generation-present), Apple Watch Sport (1st generation), Apple Watch Nike+ (Series 2-Series 7, combined into Apple Watch since Series 8), Apple Watch Hermès (1st generation-present, including Apple Watch Ultra 2, excluding Apple Watch SE and Apple Watch Ultra), and Apple Watch Edition (1st generation-Series 7, excluding Apple Watch SE). They are differentiated by combinations of cases, bands, and exclusive watch faces; Apple Watch comes with either aluminum or stainless steel cases, and various watch bands (only stainless steel was offered for Apple Watch 1st generation); Apple Watch Sport came with aluminum cases and sport bands or woven nylon bands; Apple Watch Nike+ comes with aluminum cases and Nike sport bands or sport loops; Apple Watch Hermès uses stainless steel cases and Hermès leather watch bands (also included is an exclusive Hermès orange sport band); and Apple Watch Edition came with ceramic cases and various bands (the Apple Watch Edition used 18 karat yellow or rose gold). With the Series 5, the Edition tier was expanded with a new titanium case.

The Apple Watch Series 1 models were previously only available with aluminum cases and sport bands.

As of Series 3, each Apple Watch model in aluminum, the least expensive casing, is available either with or without LTE cellular connectivity, while the models with the other casing materials available (stainless steel and sometimes ceramic and titanium) always include it.

Each model through the Series 3 comes in a 38mm or 42mm size option, with the larger size having a slightly larger screen and battery. The Series 4 was updated to 40mm and 44mm models, respectively. The Series 7 has been updated to 41mm and 45mm models. The Series 10 has been updated to 42mm and 46mm models. Each model has various color and band options. Featured Apple-made bands include colored sport bands, sport loop, woven nylon band, classic buckle, modern buckle, leather loop, Milanese loop, and a link bracelet.

=== First generation ===
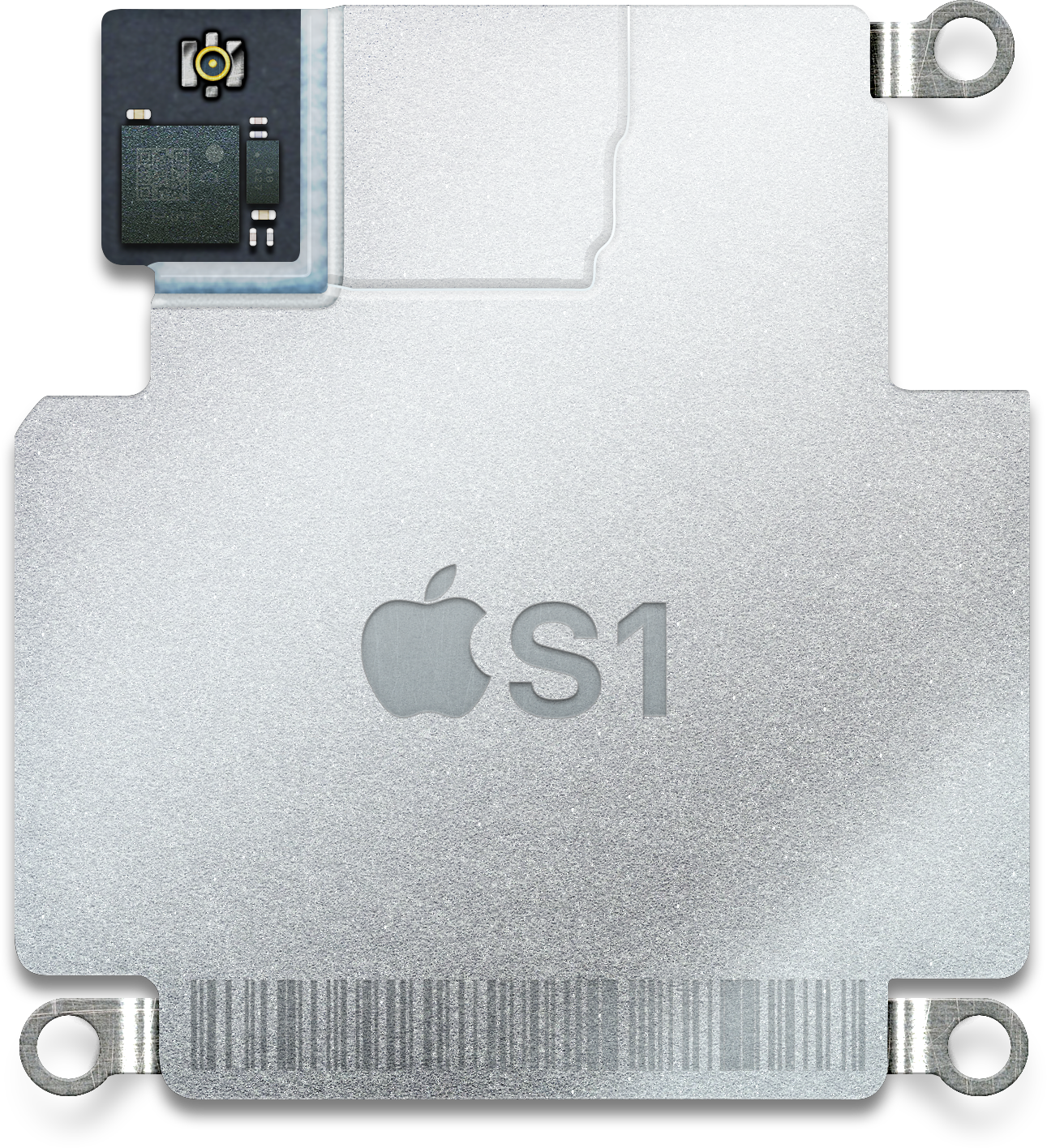
Apple S1

The 1st generation Apple Watch (colloquially referred to as Series 0) uses the single-core S1 system-on-chip. It does not have a built-in GPS chip, instead relying on a paired iPhone for location services. It features a linear actuator hardware from Apple called the "Taptic Engine", providing realistic haptic feedback when an alert or a notification is received, and is used for other purposes by certain apps. The watch is equipped with a built-in heart rate sensor, which uses both infrared and visible-light LEDs and photodiodes.

All versions of the first-generation Apple Watch have 8 GB of storage; the operating system allows the user to store up to 2 GB of music and 75 MB of photos. When the Apple Watch is paired with an iPhone, all music on that iPhone is also available to be controlled and accessed from the Apple Watch. Software support for the first Apple Watch ended with watchOS 4.3.2.

The first-generation Apple Watch Edition sub-lineup had an MSRP ranging from $10,000 USD to $17,000 USD, and included the Yellow Gold and Rose Gold 18K gold cases.

=== Second generation (Series 1 and 2) ===
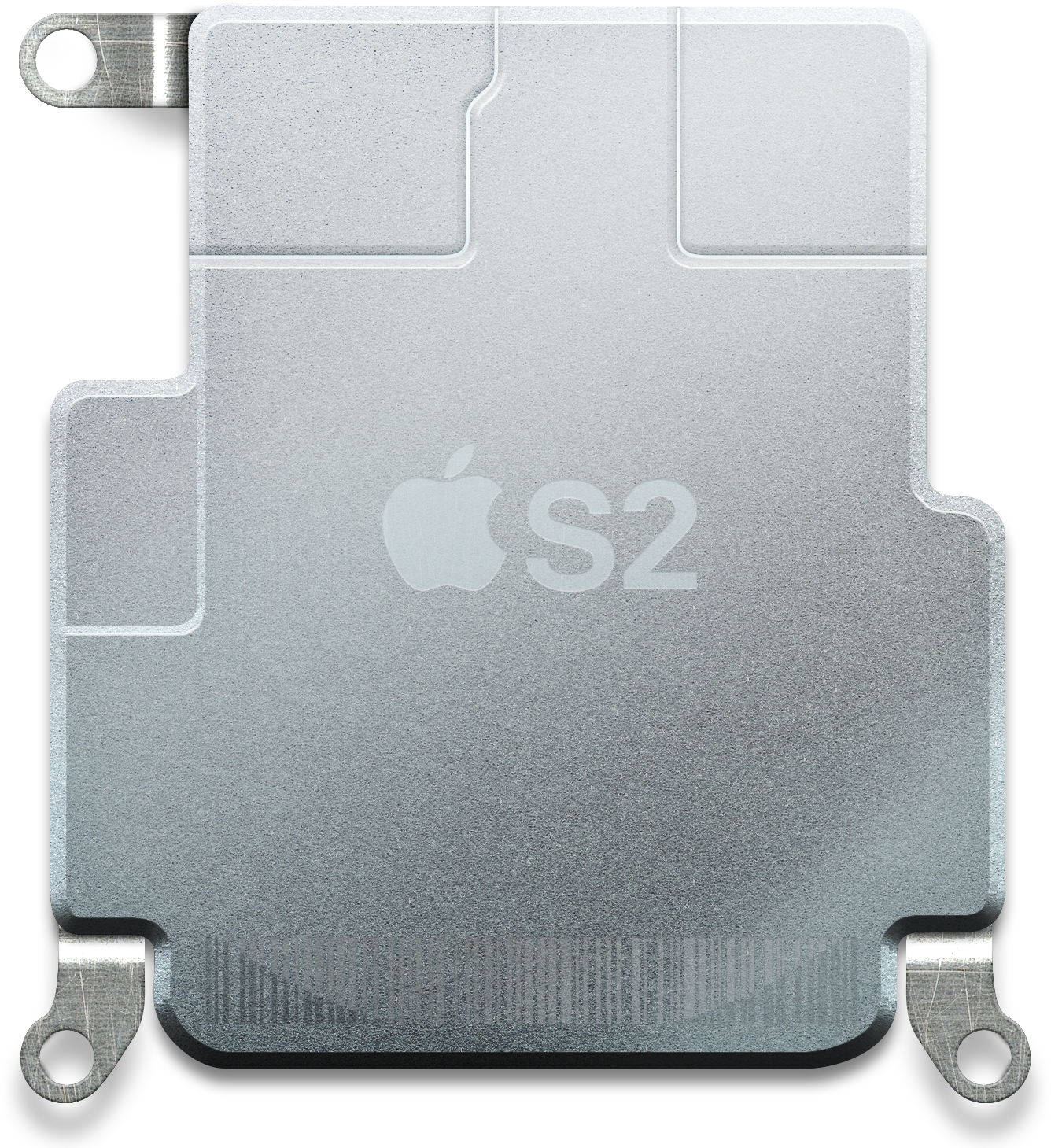
Apple S2

The second-generation Apple Watch has two models: the Apple Watch Series 1 and Apple Watch Series 2.

The Series 1 has a variant of the dual-core Apple S2 processor with GPS removed, known as the Apple S1P. It has a lower starting price than first generation. The Series 1 was sold only in aluminum casings.

The Series 2 has the dual-core Apple S2 processor, water resistance to 50 meters, a display twice as bright, at 1,000 nits, and a GPS receiver. The Series 2 was sold in casings of anodized aluminum, stainless steel and ceramic.

The Apple Watch Edition Series 2 is the first Apple Watch model to add the new White ceramic case color option. Both Yellow Gold and Rose Gold 18K gold case color options have been removed.

The Apple Watch Nike+ Series 2 is the first Apple Watch model available as the Nike, Inc. collaborate special option.

The Apple Watch Series 1 and Apple Watch Series 2 are the final Apple Watch models available with Yellow Gold and Rose Gold aluminum case color options. They have an advertised 18 hours of battery life.

The software support for both Apple Watch Series 1 and Apple Watch Series 2 ended with watchOS 6.3.1.

=== Third generation (Series 3) ===
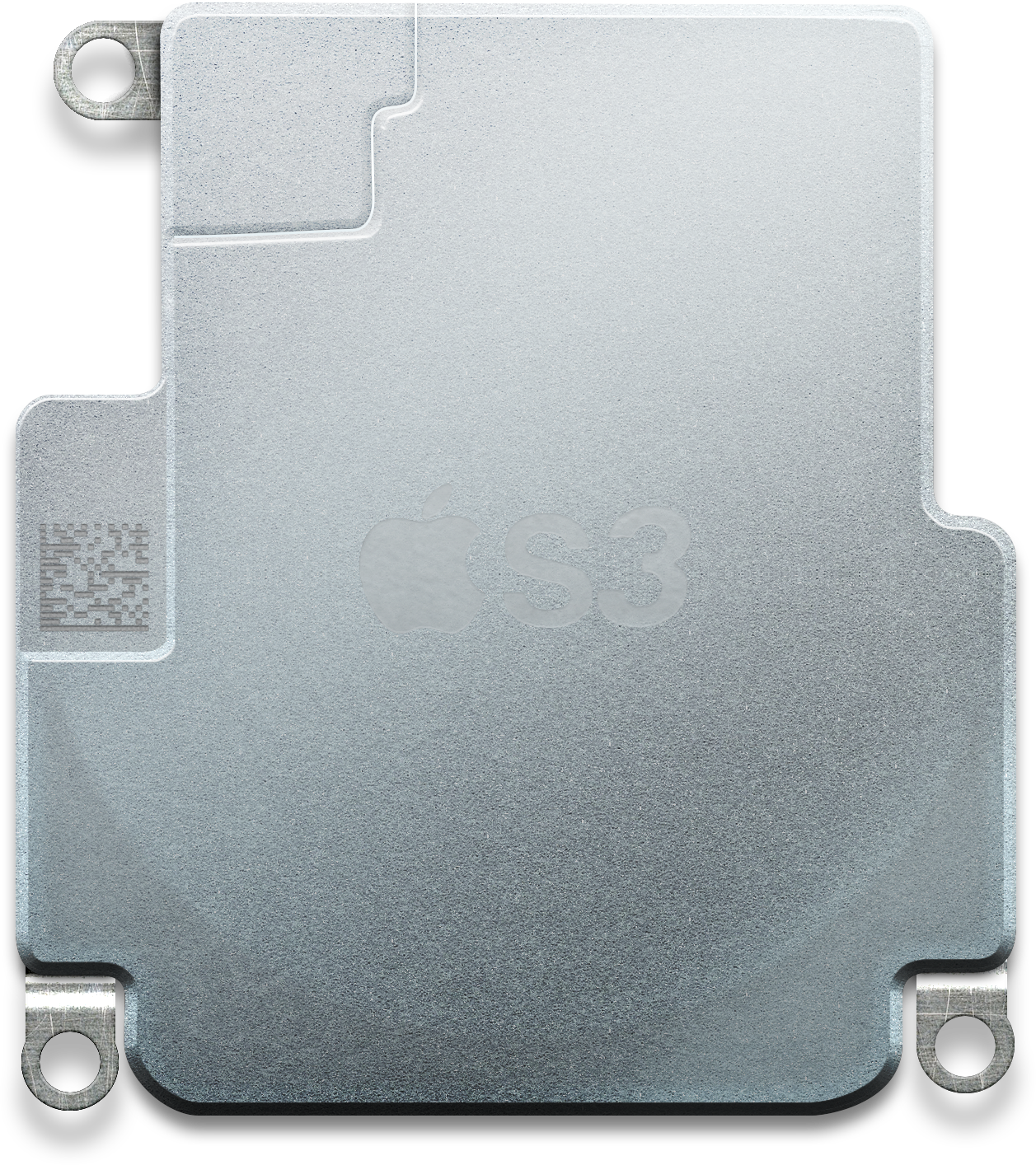
Apple S3

The Apple Watch Series 3 features a faster processor, the dual-core S3, Bluetooth 4.2 (compared to 4.0 on older models), a built-in altimeter for measuring flights of stairs climbed, increased RAM size, and is available in a variant with LTE cellular connectivity. Siri can speak through the onboard speaker on Apple Watch Series 3 due to the increased processing speed of the Watch.

Series 3 features LTE cellular connectivity for the first time in an Apple Watch, enabling users to make phone calls, iMessage, and stream Apple Music and Podcasts directly on the watch, independent of an iPhone. The LTE model contains an eSIM and shares the same mobile number as the user's iPhone.

The Apple Watch Series 3 is the first Apple Watch model to add the new Gold aluminum case color option to match the color introduced with the iPhone 8 in 2017. Both Yellow Gold and Rose Gold aluminum case color options have been removed. It is now available in Space Gray, Silver, and Gold aluminum case color options, available in Space Black and Silver stainless steel case color options.

The Apple Watch Edition Series 3 is the first and only Apple Watch model to add the new Gray ceramic case color option. It is available in White and Gray ceramic case color.

The software support for the Apple Watch Series 3 ended with watchOS 8.8.2.

=== Fourth generation (Series 4) ===
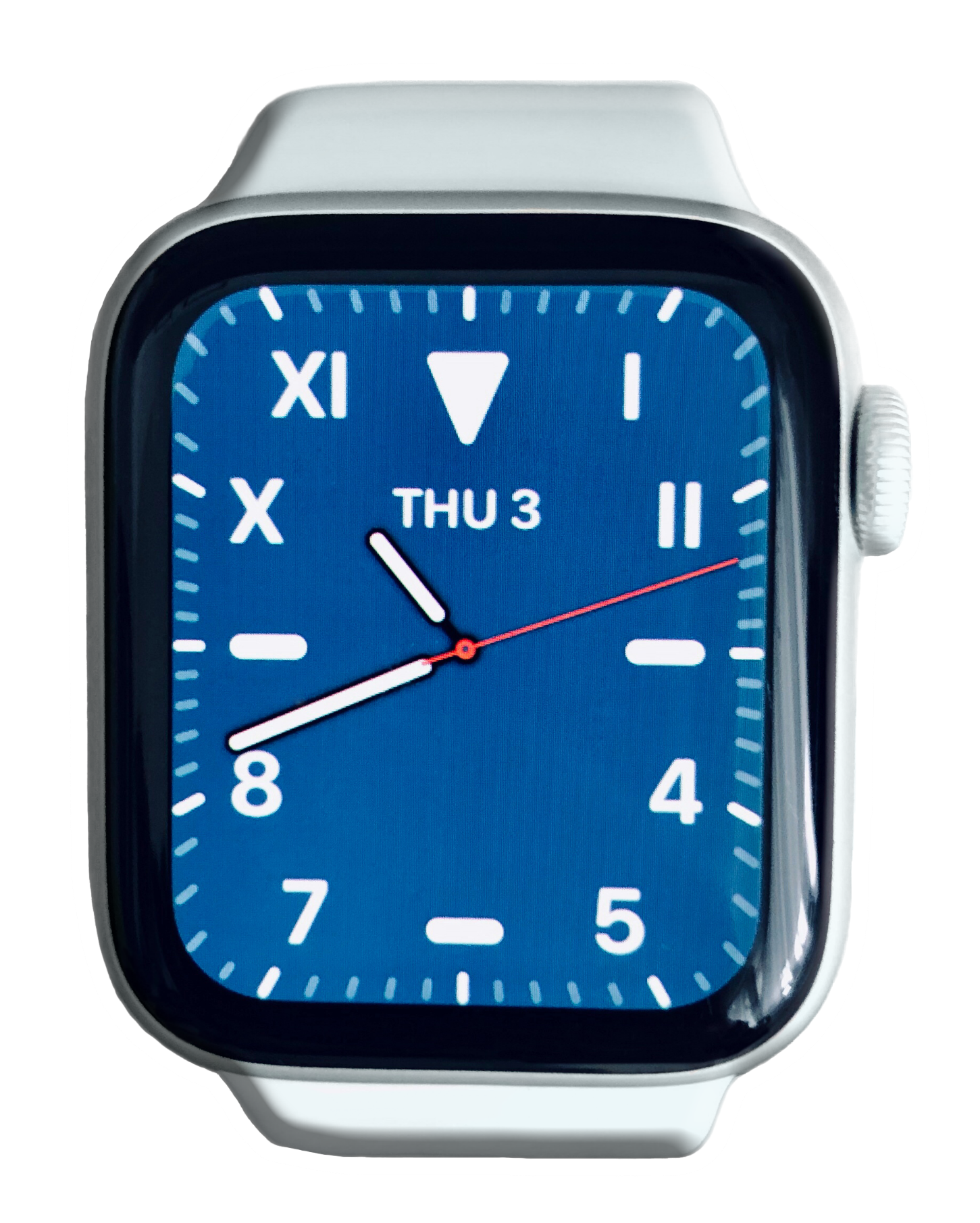
Apple Watch Series 4 with California dial

The Apple Watch Series 4 is the first prominent redesign of the Apple Watch, featuring larger displays with thinner bezels and rounded corners, and a slightly rounder, thinner chassis with a redesigned ceramic back. Internally, there is a new S4 64-bit dual-core processor, capable of up to double the S3's performance, upgraded 16 GB storage, and a new electrical heart sensor. The microphone was moved to the opposite side between the side button and the digital crown to improve call quality. Other changes include the digital crown incorporating haptic feedback with the Apple Haptic Engine, and include the new Apple-designed W3 wireless chip.

The ECG system has received clearance from the United States Food and Drug Administration, a first ever for a consumer device, and is supported by the American Heart Association. The Series 4 can also detect falls, and can automatically contact emergency services unless the user cancels the outgoing call.

The watch received mostly positive reviews from critics. TechRadar gave it a score of 4.5/5, calling it one of the top smartwatches, while criticizing the short battery life. Digital Trends gave it a score of 5/5, calling it Apple's best product and praising the design, build quality, and software, among others, while criticizing the battery life. CNET gave it a score of 8.2/10, calling it the "best overall smartwatch around", while criticizing the battery life and lack of watch face options. T3 gave it a score of 5/5, calling it a "truly next-gen smartwatch" due to its thinner body and bigger screen compared to the Series 3, and health features.

The Apple Series 4 is the first Apple Watch model to add the new Gold stainless steel color option to match the color introduced with the iPhone XS in 2018. It is now available in Space Gray, Silver, and Gold aluminum case color options, available in Space Black, Silver, and Gold stainless steel case color options. All the ceramic case color options have been removed until the launch of the Apple Watch Edition Series 5 in 2019.

Software support for the Apple Watch Series 4, Series 5, and the first-generation Apple Watch SE ended with watchOS 10.6.1.

=== Fifth generation (Series 5 and first-generation SE) ===
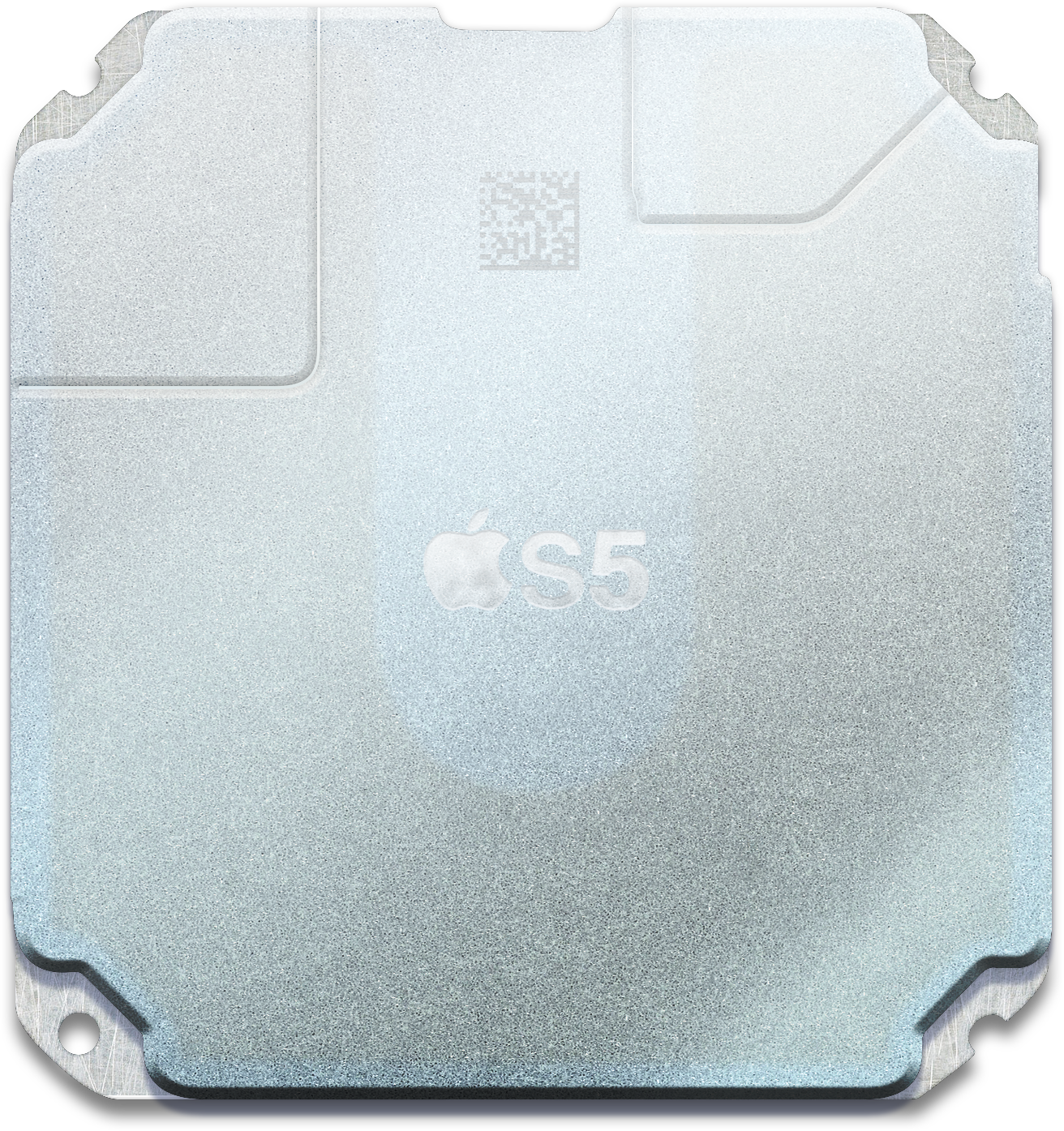
Apple S5

The Apple Watch Series 5 was announced on September 10, 2019. Its principal improvements over its predecessor were the addition of a compass and an always-on display with a low-power display driver capable of refresh rates as low as once per second. Additional new features include International Emergency Calling, enabling emergency calls in over 150 countries, a more energy-efficient S5 processor, improved ambient light sensor, and storage doubled to 32 GB. The release of the Series 5 also brought back the "Edition" model, with a ceramic model absent from the previous generation. A new titanium model was also included in two colors: natural and Space Black.

At its September 2020 product introduction event, Apple also announced the Apple Watch SE, a lower-cost model, similar to the iPhone SE. The SE incorporates the same always-on altimeter as the Series 6, but uses the previous-generation S5 processor and previous- (i.e. second) generation optical heart rate sensor; does not include ECG and blood oximeter sensors or an always-on display; and does not include ultra-wideband (UWB) or 5 GHz Wi-Fi communication capabilities.

The Series 5 and above (including the SE model introduced in 2020) also incorporate enhanced hardware- and software-based battery and performance management functionality.

Critics generally gave it a positive review. CNET gave it a score of 4/5, concluding, "The Apple Watch continues to be one of the best smartwatches, but it remains limited by being an iPhone accessory for now." Digital Trends gave it a score of 4.5/5. The Verge gave it a score of 9/10.

The Apple Watch Series 5 was available in Space Gray, Silver, and Gold aluminum case color options, as well as Space Black, Silver, and Gold stainless steel case color options.

The Apple Watch Edition Series 5 was the final Apple Watch model available with a White ceramic case color option. It was the first Apple Watch model to add the new Natural and Space Black titanium case color options.

The first-generation Apple Watch SE was discontinued following the release of the second-generation Apple Watch SE in 2022.

Software support for the Apple Watch Series 4, Series 5, and the first-generation Apple Watch SE ended with watchOS 10.6.1.

=== Sixth generation (Series 6) ===
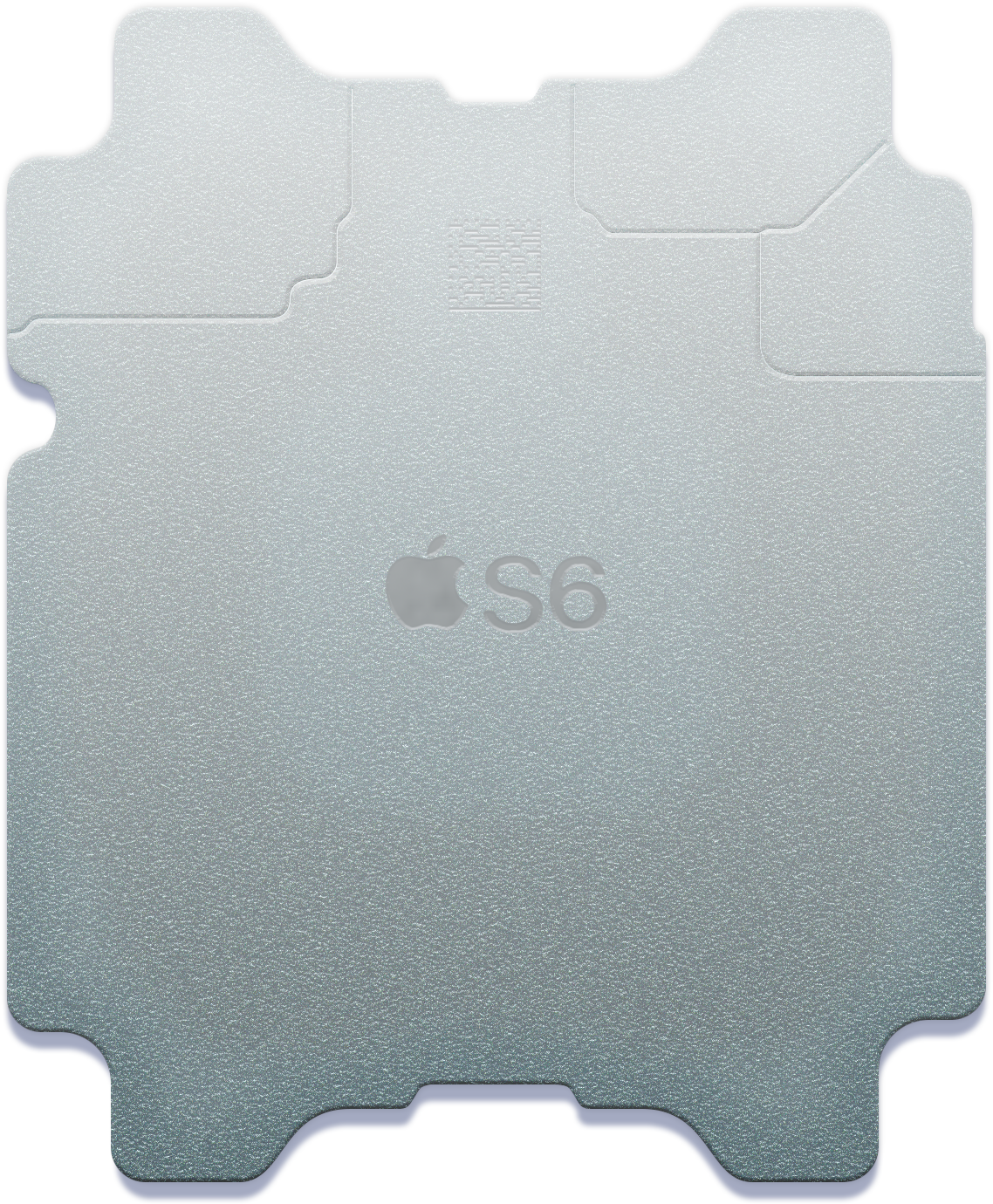
Apple S6

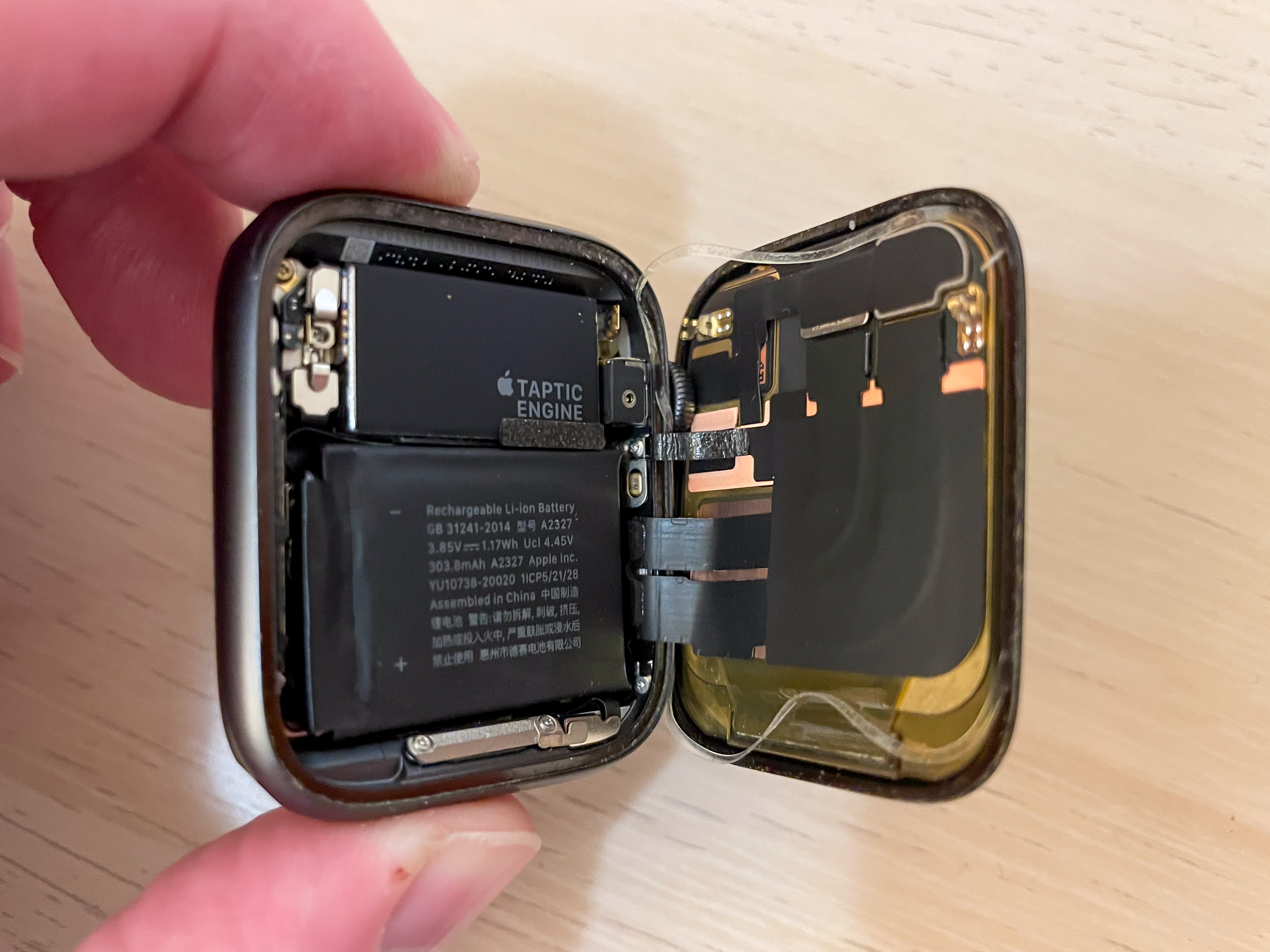
The inside of a Series 6

The Apple Watch Series 6 was announced on September 15, 2020, during an Apple Special Event and began shipping on September 18. Its principal improvement over its predecessor is the inclusion of a sensor to monitor blood oxygen saturation.

Additional features include a new Apple S6 utilizing the energy-efficient Thunder cores from the A13 Bionic that is up to 20% faster than the Apple S4 and Apple S5, a 2.5× brighter always-on display, and an always-on altimeter. The S6 incorporates an updated, third generation optical heart rate sensor and also enhanced telecommunication technology, including support for ultra-wideband (UWB) via Apple's U1 chip (which is used to locate and communicate with other devices), and the ability to connect to 5 GHz Wi-Fi networks. The Series 6 watch was updated with faster charging hardware, such that it completes charging in ~1.5 hours. Force Touch hardware was removed, consistent with the removal of all Force Touch functionality from watchOS 7.

The Apple Watch Series 6 is the final Apple Watch model available with Space Gray and Gold (introduced with the iPhone 8 in 2017) aluminum case color options. It is the first time adding the Product Red and Blue aluminum case color options. It is available in Space Gray, Silver, Gold, Blue, and Product Red aluminum case color options, available in Graphite, Silver, and Gold stainless steel case color options. The Gold stainless steel case color option is now in classic yellow gold, and the Graphite stainless steel case color option is the new color, replacing the Space Black color before the introduction of the iPhone 12 Pro in 2020.

The Apple Watch Edition Series 6 is now available in Natural and Space Black titanium case color options. The ceramic case option was removed.

=== Seventh generation (Series 7) ===
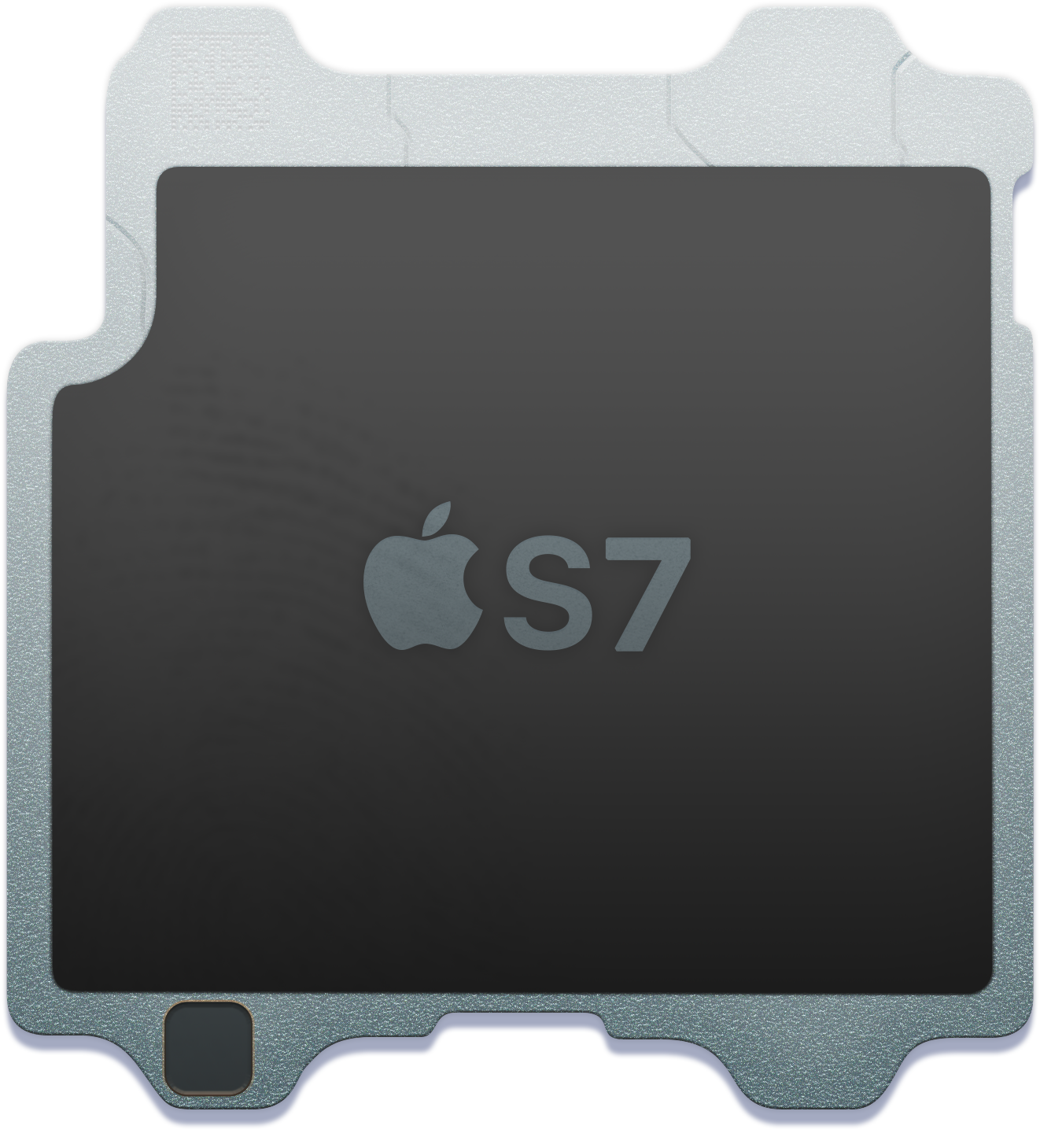
Apple S7

The Apple Watch Series 7 was announced on September 14, 2021, during an Apple Special Event. Pre-orders opened on October 8, with earliest shipping dates starting on October 15.

Succeeding from the Apple S6, the Apple S7 is the second time utilizing the energy-efficient Thunder cores from the A13 Bionic.

Enhancements relative to the prior-generation Series 6 watch include a more rounded design with a case 1 mm larger than the Series 6; a display that is 70% brighter indoors and approximately 20% larger; improved durability via a crack-resistant front crystal; IP6X certification for resistance to dust; 33% faster charging via improved internal electronics and an enhanced, USB-C based fast-charging cable; support for BeiDou (China's satellite navigation system); and the availability of an on-screen keyboard that can be tapped or swiped. The Series 7 is also equipped with new hardware that enables ultra-rapid, short-range wireless data transfer at 60.5 GHz, which replaces the Diagnostic Port for restoring or updating the watch.

The Apple Watch Edition Series 7 is the final Apple Watch model to be available in Natural and Space Black titanium case color options.

The Apple Watch Series 7 is now available in Midnight, Starlight, Blue, Green, and Product Red aluminum case color options, available in Graphite, Silver, and Gold (introduced with the Apple Watch Series 6 and the iPhone 12 Pro in 2020) stainless steel case color options. Both Space Gray and Gold (introduced with iPhone 8 in 2017) aluminum case color options have been removed. The Silver aluminum case color option was unavailable until the launch of the Apple Watch Series 8 in 2022.

=== Eighth generation (Series 8 and SE (2nd generation)) ===
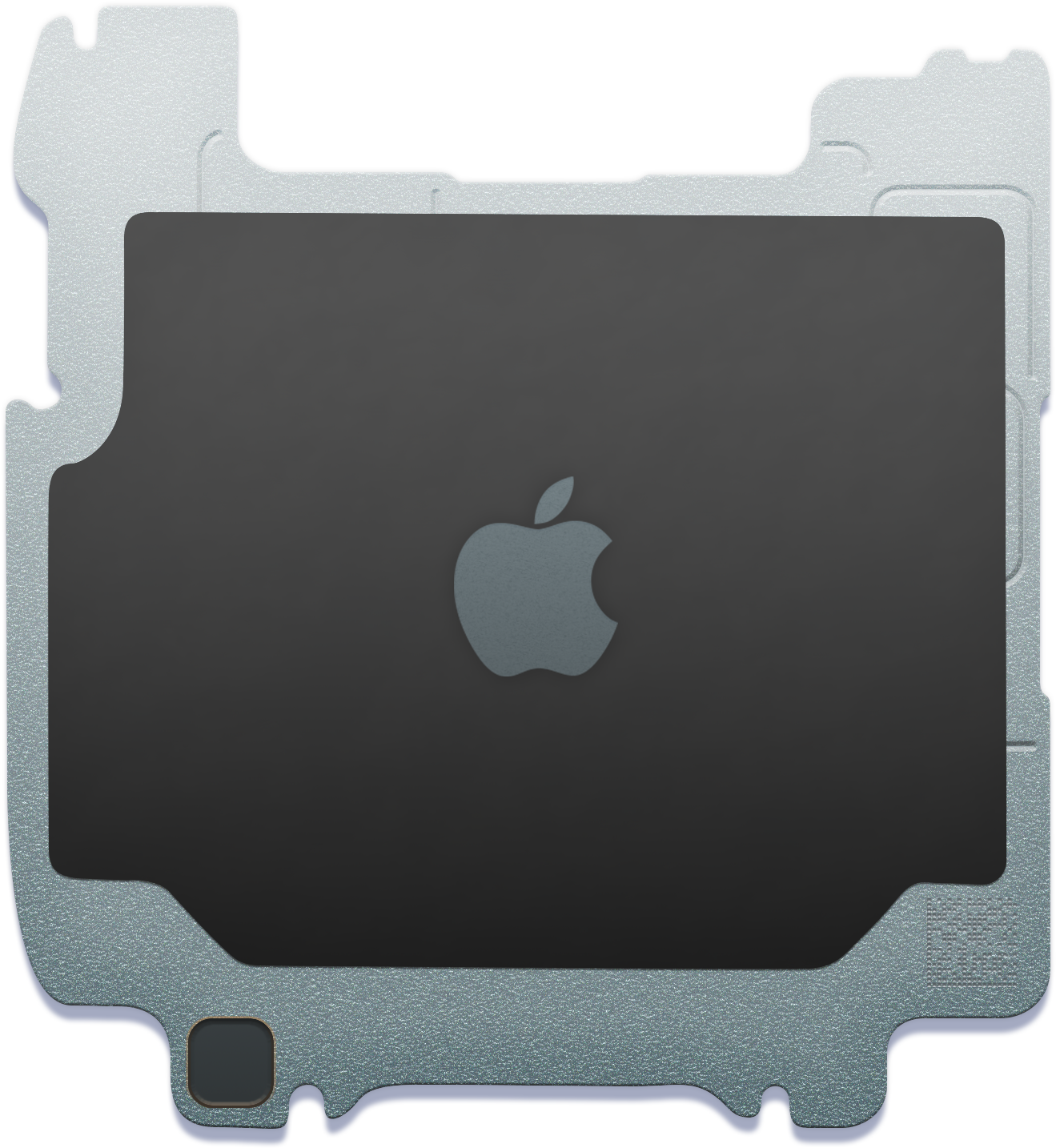
Apple S8

The Apple Watch Series 8, the Apple Watch SE 2 (formerly the Apple Watch SE (2nd generation)), and the Apple Watch Ultra were announced during Apple's "Far out" event on September 7, 2022. Pre-orders opened on the same day, with the Series 8 and 2nd gen SE shipping on September 16, while the Ultra shipped on September 23.

Succeeding from the Apple S7, the Apple S8 is the final processor of the Apple Watch to utilize the energy-efficient Thunder cores from the A13 Bionic.

Enhancements in the Series 8, relative to the prior-generation Series 7 watch, include a new temperature sensor and more precise accelerometers, and Crash Detection. Aluminum case models are available in Midnight, Silver, Starlight, and Product Red, and the stainless steel models are available in gold, silver, and graphite finishes. The Blue and Green case colors are discontinued, and the Series 8 is not available with a titanium case.

The Apple Watch Ultra is a new high-end model which Apple positioned towards endurance athletes and outdoor recreation (competing with offerings from companies such as Garmin and Polar); it shares most of its hardware with the Series 8, but it has a larger display and 49 mm band, a rugged titanium casing, a brighter display with a flat front crystal, an additional "Action" button that can be mapped to different apps and functions, integrated multi-band GPS, a water temperature sensor, and a larger battery which Apple rated at 36 hours of usage without using power saving modes.

The second-generation Apple Watch SE is available in Midnight, Silver, and Starlight case color options. The Space Gray and Gold case color options have been discontinued. It retains the form factor of the previous SE, which was itself very similar to the Series 4, 5, and 6.

=== Ninth generation (Series 9) ===
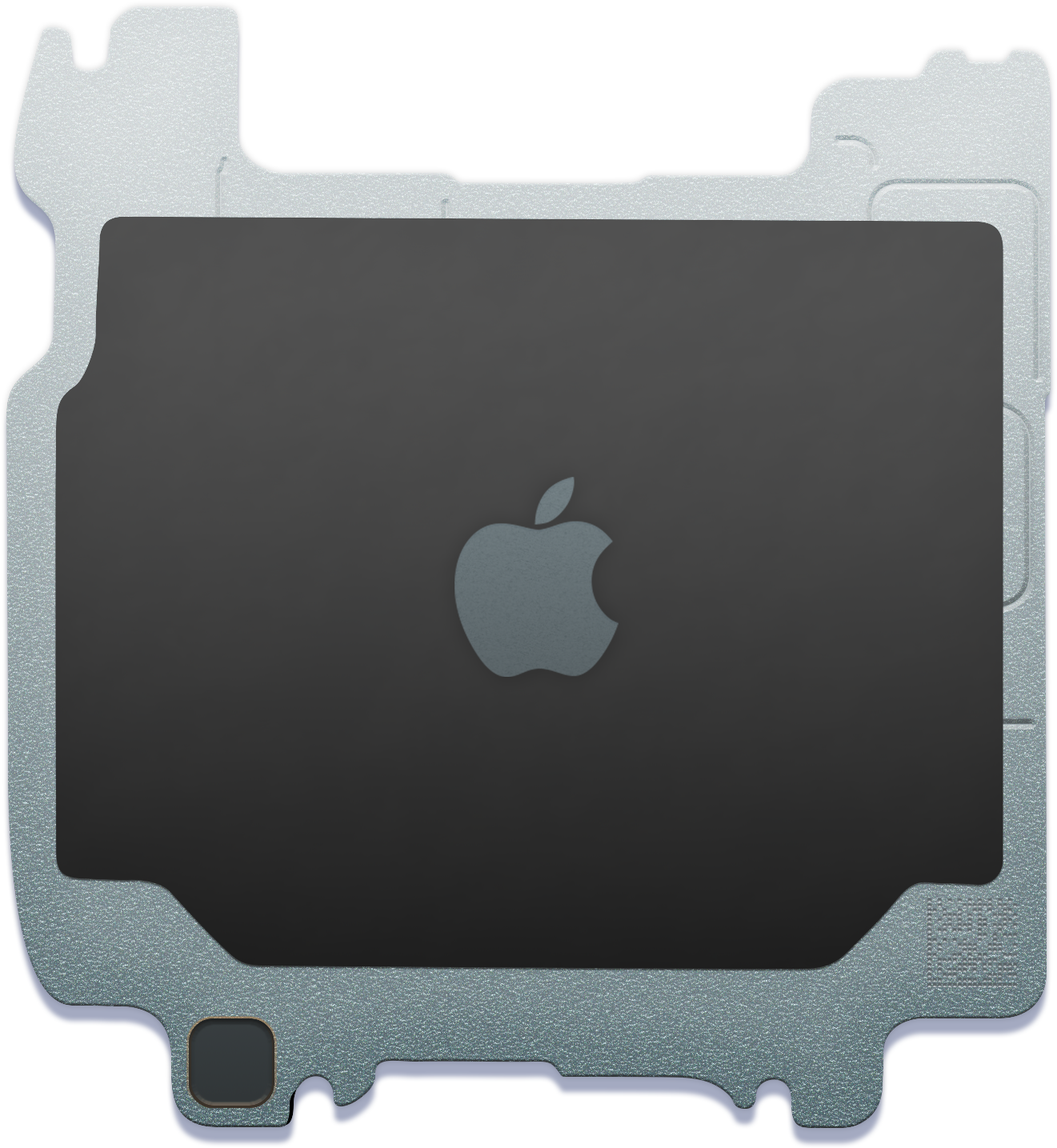
Apple S9

The Apple Watch Series 9 and Ultra 2 were announced during Apple's "Wonderlust" event on September 12, 2023. Both of these Apple Watch models have the new Apple S9 system-in-package utilizing the energy-efficient Sawtooth cores from the A16 Bionic with a faster GPU and a four-core Neural Engine, improved power efficiency, and a second-generation Ultrawide Band chip (shared with iPhone 15) with improved precision and a farther range. Their displays have a higher maximum brightness than their predecessors. Both Apple Watch Series 9 and Apple Watch Ultra 2 ship with watchOS 10; they support on-device Siri and a new "double tap" gesture using the index finger and thumb.

Aluminum case models are available in Midnight, Pink, Starlight, Silver, and Product Red color options, while the stainless steel models are available in gold, silver, and graphite finishes.

For legal reasons, blood oxygen monitoring was not available on Apple Watch Series 9 and Ultra 2 models sold in the United States after January 18, 2024.

Following a ruling by the International Trade Commission on a lawsuit regarding the blood oxygen monitoring feature, Apple temporarily stopped selling Apple Watch Series 9 and Ultra 2 on December 21, 2023, ahead of an import ban going into effect on December 26, 2023. At the time, 9to5Mac reported, "Apple says that the ITC’s ban only impacts sales of the Apple Watch Series 9 and Apple Watch Ultra 2 because those devices offer blood oxygen monitoring capabilities." A US Federal Appeals Court paused the import ban pending a US Customs and Border Protection ruling on whether Apple's changes would be enough to avoid the patent dispute, and Apple resumed sales on December 27, 2023.

On August 14, 2025, Apple reintroduced blood oxygen monitoring for affected Series 9, Series 10, and Ultra 2 Apple Watches with the iOS 18.6.1 and watchOS 11.6.1 software updates. To circumvent patent disputes, the redesigned app no longer analyzes blood oxygen data through the on-device app. Raw data is collected by the Apple Watch, then "measured and calculated on the paired iPhone."

==== Carbon neutrality claims ====
Apple markets the Series 9 and Ultra 2 as its first-ever carbon-neutral products (depending on the selected case material and band) due to a combination of cutting the carbon dioxide emissions per watch manufactured and sold (Apple claims a reduction of 78% for the Series 9 and 81% for the Ultra 2 (Note: Series 9 emissions decreased from 36.7kg to 8.1kg, and Ultra 2 emissions from 63.2kg to 12kg)) and the company's purchases of forestry and nature-based carbon offsets and credits—which some criticized for being misleading due to reliability issues in carbon accounting for forestry carbon offsets.

Most of Apple's claimed emissions reductions were driven by renewable energy requirements imposed on suppliers; other factors include increased use of recycled materials, and a lower reliance on shipping products by plane, which is highly carbon-intensive. Apple says the watches' manufacturing relies on "100% clean electricity", though this partly relies on Apple investing in clean-energy projects to offset suppliers' use of electricity produced from fossil fuels. NewClimate Institute, a non-profit, said Apple's "100 per cent clean energy" claim was "highly contentious, since Apple’s major suppliers continue to have very low renewable electricity shares".

The carbon offsets used by Apple follow standards set by Verra, the Climate, Community & Biodiversity Alliance, and the Forest Stewardship Council. However, some investigative reporting has indicated that 94% of Verra's rainforest carbon offsets were allegedly "worthless" and that the standard may worsen global warming. Niklas Kaskeala, chair of the non-profit Compensate Foundation, said Apple's tree-planting offsets had "systemic flaws"; the Financial Times found that in one Apple conservation scheme, newly planted trees were chopped down within a decade, releasing absorbed carbon back into the atmosphere, that most of the planted trees were eucalyptus, posing monoculture concerns, and that only 1% of the land was dedicated to regrowing native tree species.

On September 20, 2023, the European Union announced that it would ban most uses of the term "carbon neutral" in advertising by 2026, including claims that are based on carbon offsets, to address greenwashing and misleading advertising. This decision was praised by Monique Goyens, director-general of EU consumer group BEUC, who also called Apple's claims "bogus" and scientifically inaccurate. Gilles Dufrasne, policy officer at non-profit Carbon Market Watch, said it was "misleading to consumers" for Apple to give "the impression that buying the Watch has no impact on the climate at all", based on what he described as "accounting tricks". Other environmental groups criticized Apple's emphasis on carbon emissions without accounting for e-waste, due to the difficulty of repairing these products. Berkeley Carbon Trading Project director Barbara Haya praised the products' ~80% emissions reduction, but also criticized Apple's use of the term "carbon neutral" in advertising.

=== Tenth generation (Series 10) ===
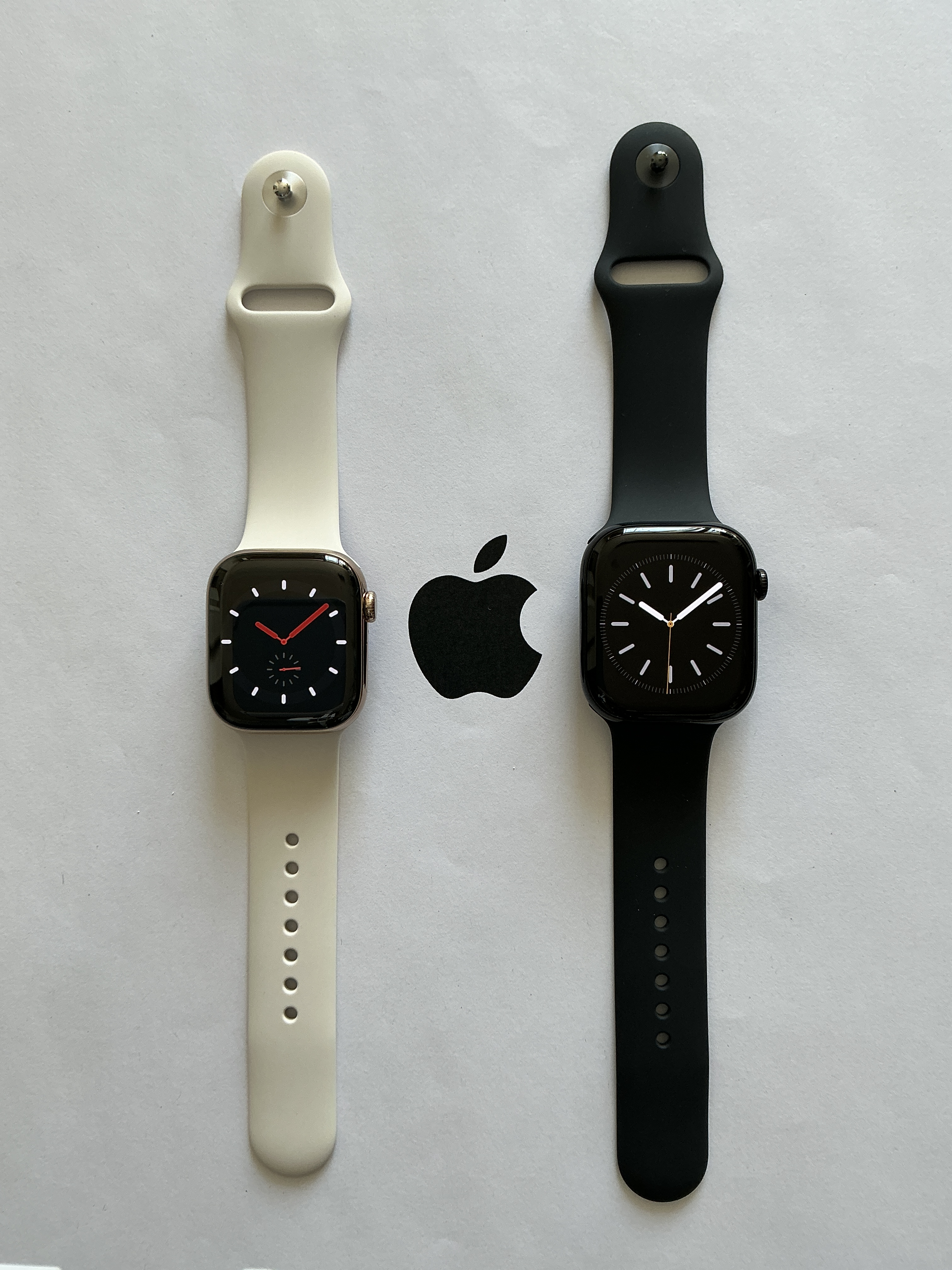
Apple Watch Series 10 (front view)

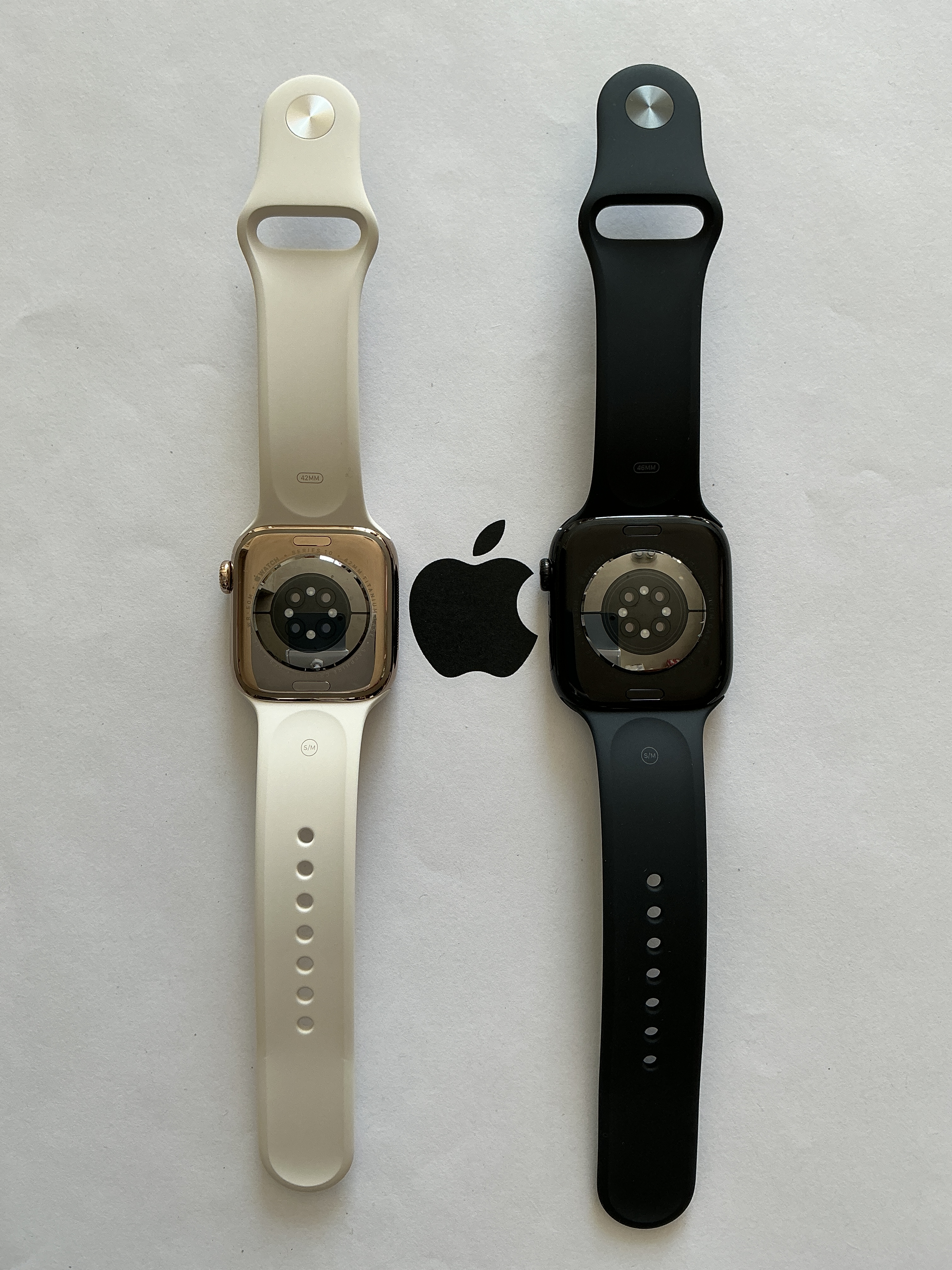
Apple Watch Series 10 (back view)

The Apple Watch Series 10 was announced at an Apple's "It's Glowtime" event on September 9, 2024. The device features a thinner design than previous models, measuring 10% thinner than the Series 9. It has the largest display Apple has built for a wearable device, including the Apple Watch Ultra, with up to 30% more screen area. The display allows for an additional line of text, enhancing the visibility of messages, mail, and news.

Succeeding from the Apple S9, the Apple S10 is the second time utilizing the energy-efficient Sawtooth cores from the A16 Bionic.

The Series 10 introduced a wider aspect ratio with rounded corners for both the display and case. The display is also 40% brighter when viewed at an angle, improving visibility, and updates once per second in Always On mode, compared to the previous rate of once per minute.

Apple also introduced a new glossy aluminum finish in jet black, polished using silicon nanoparticles for a specialized surface shine. Other finish options include rose gold and silver aluminum, which are up to 10% lighter than previous models. Additionally, a new titanium finish, which is 20% lighter and carbon-neutral, replaces the stainless steel option from earlier generations.

The Apple Watch Series 10 retains 50 meters of water resistance and is the fastest-charging Apple Watch to date, reaching 80% battery in 30 minutes. The device features an 18-hour battery life.

The Apple Watch Series 10 also includes a sleep apnea detector, approved by the FDA in Sep 2024, which is also supported by the Apple Watch Series 9 and the Apple Watch Ultra 2.

To enhance phone call quality, the Series 10 incorporates a neural network that suppresses background noise for clearer conversations. The fitness features have been expanded to include tracking for kayakers, canoers, and rowers, along with a Tides app and new depth and water temperature sensors.

Prices for the Apple Watch Series 10 start at $399, with preorders available immediately. The device was released on September 20, 2024.

The Apple Watch Series 10 has been subject to a sales ban in Indonesia since October 2024.

=== Eleventh generation (Series 11, Ultra 3, and SE 3) ===
The eleventh-generation Apple Watch was introduced on September 9, 2025, alongside the third-generation Apple Watch Ultra and SE, and was released on September 19, 2025.

The Apple Watch Series 11 additionally added the Space Gray color option, in addition to the existing Jet Black, Rose Gold, and Silver color options that were introduced with the Apple Watch Series 10.

The third-generation Apple Watch SE is the first Apple Watch model since the Apple Watch Series 7 to not come in the silver color option. It is the first Apple Watch SE model to feature the Always-On display technology. The Apple Watch Ultra 3 has the same enclosure design as its predecessors.

As the Apple Watch Series 10 did, all three eleventh generation Apple Watches use the Apple S10 chip, and are the first Apple Watches to employ 5G connectivity. The Apple Watch Ultra 3 supports connectivity to satellites to send messages. The Apple Watch Series 11 also introduced an FDA-cleared hypertension notifications feature, which was trained on 9,800 participants to detect signs of high blood pressure by looking at the shape and speed of the pulse wave and a deep learning algorithm.

=== Twelfth generation (Series 12 and Ultra 4) ===
46mm Apple Watch Series 12 in Light Gold aluminum

Apple introduced its twelfth-generation Apple Watch alongside the fourth-generation Ultra in its September 9, 2026 event, which uses an upgraded health sensor system and the Apple S11 chip, allowing the watch to capture heart rate and heart rate variability data more frequently. The S11 chip also features an upgraded Neural Engine, which allows the watch to process live conversations in the background as part of Siri AI's Recap and Live Rewind feature. They were released on September 18, 2026.

== Software ==
watchOS is a distinct operating system designed specifically for the Apple Watch. While based on iOS, which is used in iPhones, it offers a tailored experience for the smaller screen and wrist-worn form factor. Telling time is a core function with various watch faces to choose from, and it can view and respond to notifications from an iPhone directly on a watch. watchOS has many extensive health and fitness tracking features like heart rate monitoring, workout programs, and activity rings. The App Store lets users download and use various apps specifically designed for the Apple Watch.

watchOS works with an iPhone for functions like making calls, sending texts, and using Apple Pay. Apple frequently releases updates to watchOS. One can update a watch through the Watch app on an iPhone or directly on the Apple Watch itself (if it has watchOS 6 or later).

The Apple Watch runs watchOS, whose interface is around a home screen with circular app icons, which can be changed to a list view in the device's settings. The OS can be navigated using the touchscreen or the crown on the side of the watch. During its debut, the first generation Apple Watch needed to be paired with an iPhone 5 or later running iOS 8.2 or later; this version of iOS introduced the Apple Watch app, which is used to pair the watch with an iPhone, customize settings and loaded apps, and highlight compatible apps from the App Store.

The Apple Watch is capable of receiving notifications, messages, and phone calls via a paired iPhone. "Glances" allowed users to swipe between pages containing widget-like displays of information; however, this feature was replaced by a new Control Center. watchOS also supports Handoff to send content from an Apple Watch to an iOS or macOS device, and act as a viewfinder for an iPhone camera, Siri is also available for voice commands, and is capable of responding with voice prompts on the Series 3 watches. The Apple Watch also supports Apple Pay, and enables its use with older iPhone models that do not contain near-field communication (NFC) support.

The Apple Watch's default apps are designed to interact with their iOS counterparts, such as Mail, Phone, Calendar, Messages, Maps, Music, Photos, Reminders, Remote (which can control iTunes and Apple TV), Stocks, and Wallet. Using the Activity and Workout apps, a user can track their physical activity and send data back to the iPhone for use in its Health app and other HealthKit-enabled software. With watchOS 3, Reminders, Home, Find My Friends, Heart Rate, and Breathe were added to the stock apps.

=== Version history ===
At WWDC 2015, Tim Cook announced watchOS 2; described by CNET as a "significant revamp", it included a new software development kit that allows more direct access to the device's hardware, new watch faces, the ability to reply to an e-mail, and other features. watchOS 2 was released in September 2015. Following the software update, some users experienced issues with lag.

watchOS 3 was announced at WWDC 2016, with a priority on performance. Users can keep apps running in memory as well as receive background updates and refreshed information. Other updates include a new Dock invoked with the side button to replace the performance-laden Glances, an updated Control Center, and new reply options on Messages. Several new watch faces have also been added, along with the ability to switch watch faces from the lock screen simply by swiping. A new feature called SOS allows users to hold the dock button to make a call to the local emergency line and pull up the user's Medical ID. Another feature is Activity Sharing, which allows sharing of workouts with friends and even sending their heartbeats to one another. A new app called Breathe guides users through breathing exercises throughout the day, with visuals and haptic feedback. It was made available to the public in September 2016.

watchOS 3.1 was released to the public in October 2016, and watchOS 3.2 was released in March 2017. Both updates added minor improvements and bug fixes.

watchOS 4 was announced at WWDC 2017 and released to the public in September 2017. watchOS 4 features a proactive Siri watch face, personalized activity coaching, and an entirely redesigned music app. It also introduces Apple GymKit, a technology platform to connect workouts with cardio equipment.

watchOS 4.3 was released in March 2018. It introduced support for Nightstand mode in portrait orientation. It brought back the ability for music playing on the iPhone to be controlled using the Music app on the Apple Watch and also enabled control of playback and volume on Apple's HomePod. Other new features included a new charging animation and a new app loading animation. Activity data was added to the Siri watch face, and the battery complication more accurately reports battery life.

watchOS 5 was first shown to the public at the San Jose WWDC developer conference held by Apple. It introduced an instant watch-to-watch walkie-talkie mode, an all-new Podcasts app, raise-wrist-to-speak Siri, a customizable Control Center, and the ability to access the notification center and control center from apps. Other features included support for WebKit to view web pages, six new watch faces, and new workout running features. It was released to the public in September 2018. On the newest release of watchOS beta, the sleep feature was shown on screen, which would eliminate the need to use third-party apps.

watchOS 6 was released to the public in September 2019. It introduced more native iOS apps, such as Voice Memos, Calculator, and a native watchOS app store. watchOS 6.0 also introduced new features such as the noise app that allows one to measure ambient sound in decibels, menstrual tracking, and new watch faces. Other features include Siri being able to tell users what music they are listening to, activity trends, and a new UI framework for developers.

watchOS 7 was announced on June 22, 2020, at WWDC 2020, and released on September 16, 2020; new functions include sleep tracking, additional watch faces, handwashing detection, and new workouts such as dancing.

watchOS 8 was announced on June 7, 2021, at WWDC 2021 and released on September 20, 2021. It replaces the Breathe app with a new Mindfulness app, and adds a Focus mode as well as a Portrait Watch Face, updates to the Messages and Home apps, Contacts and Find My apps, and a redesigned Photos app.

watchOS 9 was announced on June 6, 2022, and released on September 13, 2022. It enhances the Workout display with new views of metrics like Activity rings, Heart Rate Zones, Power, and Elevation. It also supports better sleep tracking and additional watch faces.

watchOS 10 was announced on June 5, 2023, at WWDC and released on September 18, 2023. It includes a major redesign of all stock watchOS apps, more detailed metrics available for cycling workouts, and new "Smart Stacks", stacks of widgets available from the clock.

watchOS 11 was announced on June 10, 2024, and released on September 16, 2024. It dropped support for the Apple Watch Series 4, Series 5, and 1st generation SE.

watchOS 26 was announced on June 9, 2025, and released on September 15, 2025. It adopts the Liquid Glass design seen on other platforms. Workout Buddy uses Apple Intelligence to provide personalized motivation during an exercise session, along with an updated layout for the Workout app. It also adds a new "wrist flick" gesture to dismiss incoming notifications, available on the Apple Watch Series 9 and Series 10, and the Apple Watch Ultra 2.

watchOS 27 was announced on June 8, 2026, at WWDC 2026. It adds Siri AI and a dedicated Siri app, as well as a Dynamic app grid. A new tap gesture allows users to select a widget in the Smart Stack, while a unified Find My app replaces the previously separate Find Devices, Find People and Find Items apps. It will drop support for the Apple Watch Series 6, Series 7, Series 8, 2nd generation Apple Watch SE and 1st generation Apple Watch Ultra.

=== Third-party apps ===
In watchOS 1, third-party WatchKit applications run in the background on the iPhone as an application extension while a set of native user interface resources is installed on the Apple Watch. Thus, watchOS apps must be bundled within their respective iOS app, and are synced to the watch either manually, or automatically upon installation of the phone app.

With the release of watchOS 2, Apple made it mandatory for new watch apps to be developed with the watchOS 2 SDK from June 1, 2016, onwards; no third-party languages or SDKs can be used to develop apps. This allowed for developers to create native apps that are run on the watch itself, thus improving the responsiveness of third-party apps.

In watchOS 5 and earlier, all watchOS apps are dependent apps – the watchOS app relies on an iOS companion app to function properly. In watchOS 6 or later, developers can create completely independent watchOS apps, and no longer require an app to be installed on the paired iPhone. This was assisted by the introduction of a separate App Store on the Apple Watch itself. With watchOS 10, apps can appear as widgets directly on the home screen.

== Reception ==
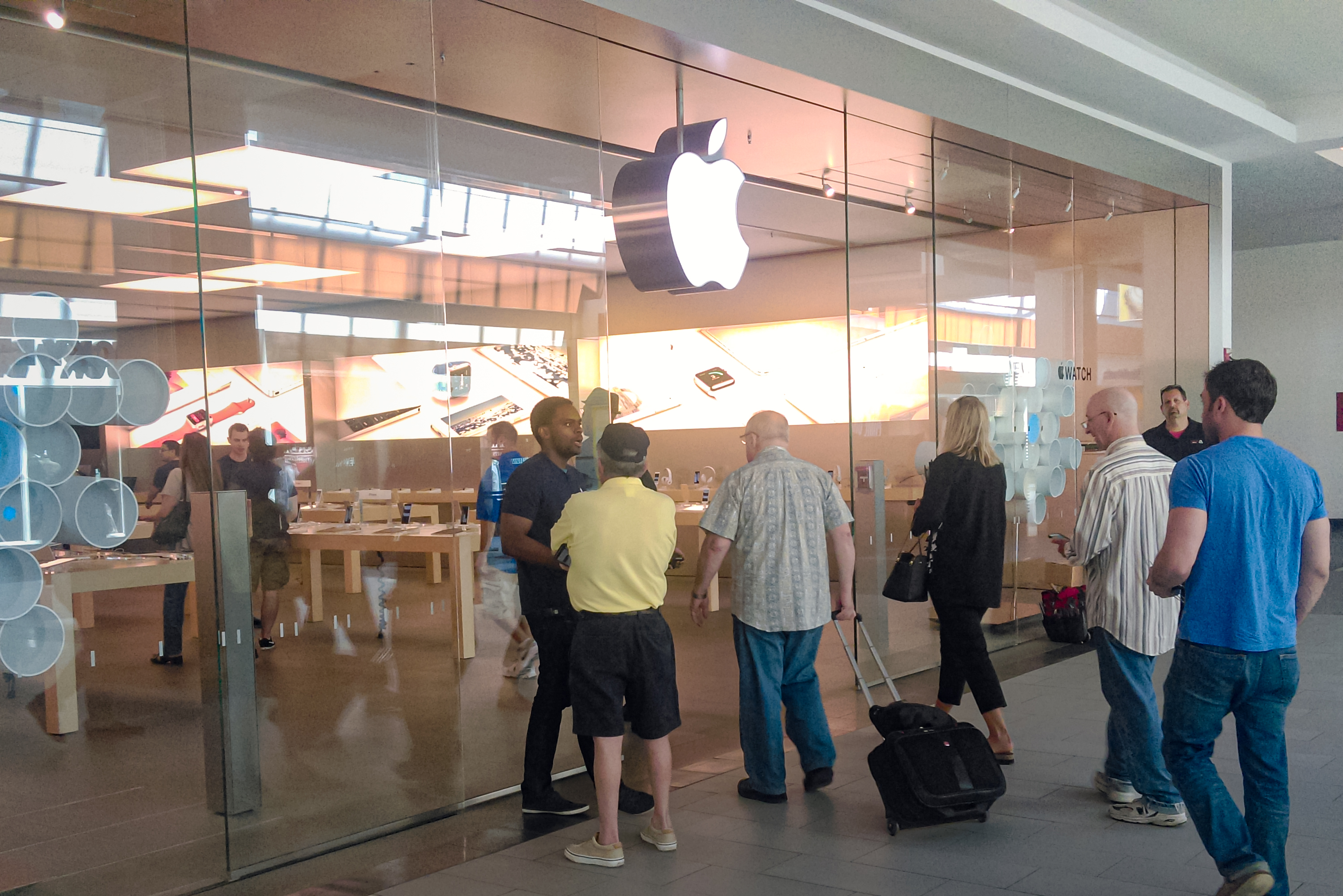
An Apple Store opens its doors on the first day of sales of the Apple Watch.

Following the announcement, initial impressions from technology and watch industry observers were varied; the watch was praised by some for its "design, potential capabilities and eventual usefulness", while others offered criticism of these same aspects. Venture capitalist Marc Andreessen said he "can't wait" to try it, and Steve Jobs' biographer Walter Isaacson described it as "extremely cool" and an example of future technology that is "much more embedded into our lives". Evan Dashevsky of PC Magazine said it offered nothing new in terms of functionality compared to the Moto 360, except the customizable vibration notifications. In November 2014, the Apple Watch was listed by Time as one of the 25 Best Inventions of 2014.

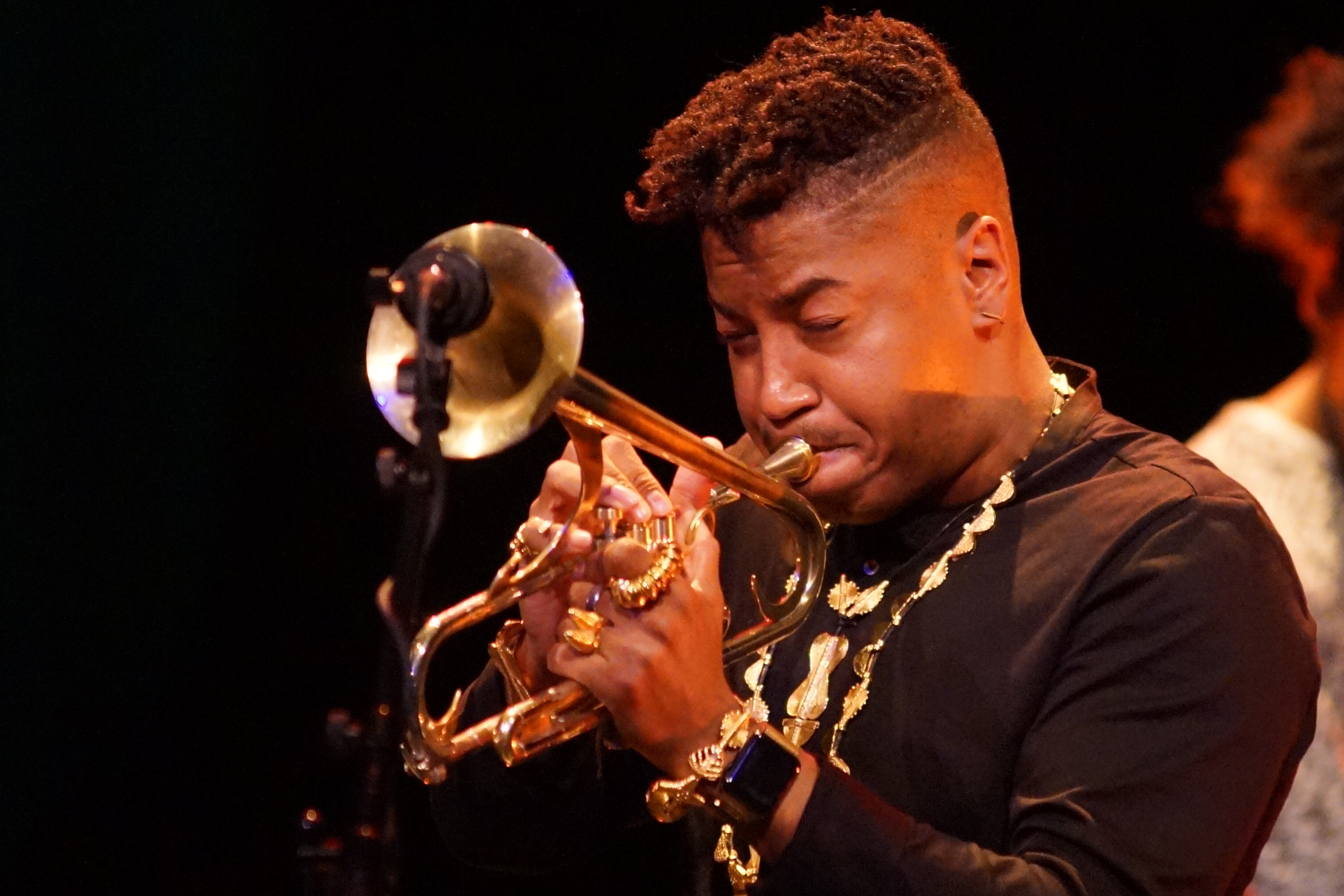
Trumpet player Chief Xian aTunde Adjuah wearing an Apple Watch

Initial reviews for the device have been generally positive with some caveats. Reviewers praised the watch's potential ability to integrate into everyday life and the overall design of the product, but noted issues of speed and price. Many reviewers described the watch as functional and convenient, while also noting its failure to offer as much potential functionality as preceding smartphones. Farhad Manjoo of The New York Times mentioned the device's steep learning curve, stating it took him "three long, often confusing and frustrating days" to become accustomed to watchOS 1, but loved it thereafter. Some reviewers also compared it to competing products, such as Android Wear devices, and claimed "The Smartwatch Finally Makes Sense". Reviewers had mixed opinions on battery life though, with Geoffrey Fowler of The Wall Street Journal saying "the battery lives up to its all-day billing, but sometimes just barely," and others compared it to the Samsung Gear 2, which "strolls through three days of moderate usage." Tim Bradshaw of the Financial Times used several applications over a period of days. He concluded that there is no "killer application" so far besides telling the time, which is the basic function of a wristwatch anyhow.

When using the Apple Watch, some users have reported issues using the heart monitoring feature due to permanent skin conditions, including tattoos. The Watch uses photoplethysmography technology (PPG) that utilizes the green LEDs to measure heart rate. To gauge a user's heart rate, the watch flashes green light from the LEDs at the skin and records the amount of this light that is absorbed by the red pigment of the blood. Under certain circumstances, the skin may not allow for the light absorption to be read properly and thus provide inaccurate results.

Some users have complained that the logo and text on the back of the Apple Watch Sport model, primarily the space gray version, can be easily worn off.

=== Sales ===
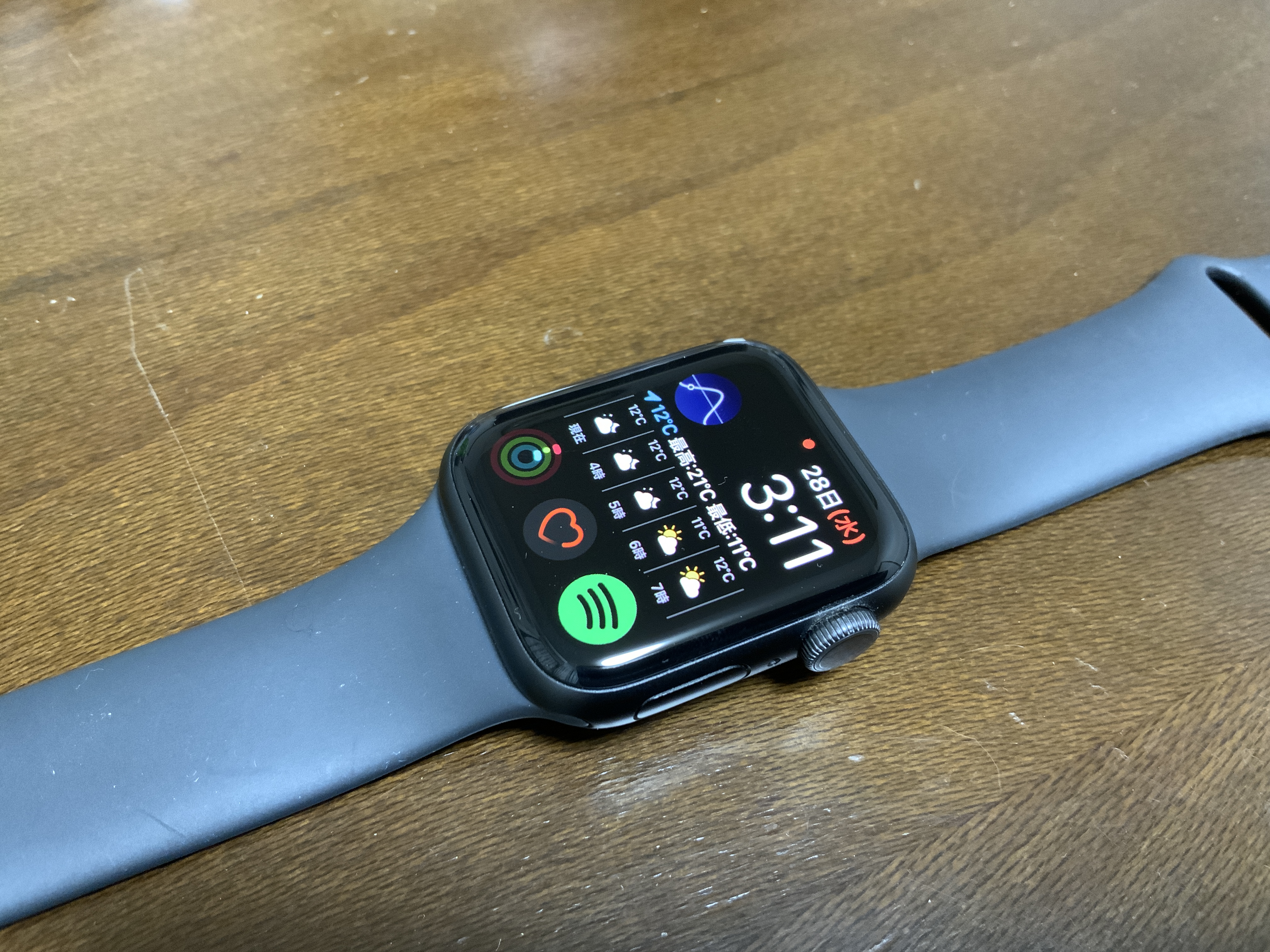
Apple Watch Series 5

Financial analysts offered early sales estimates from a few million to as many as 5 million in the first year. Time's Tim Bajarin summarized the breadth of reactions, writing that "there is not enough information yet to determine how this product will fare when it finally reaches the market next year".

Owing to the inadequacy of materials, the Apple Watch's delivery was delayed from its initial pre-order release date of April 10, 2015. As a result, only 22 percent of the pre-ordered Apple Watches were dispatched in the United States during the weekend after the release date. It is estimated Apple received almost one million Apple Watch pre-orders in the United States during the initial six hours of the pre-order period on April 10, 2015, after which it sold out and further orders would start delivering in June. A report later on by an analyst stated that the Apple Watch was already a $10 billion business during its first year.

Apple has not disclosed any sales figures for the Apple Watch. An estimate by IDC states Apple shipped over 12 million units in 2015. In late 2016, a veteran of the Swiss watch industry said Apple sold about 20 million watches and had a market share of about 50 percent. Analysts estimate Apple sold 18 million watches in 2017, 31 million in 2019, and 34 million in 2020. In 2021, analysts estimated there were 100 million units in use.

In 2020, Apple sold more watches than the entire Swiss watch industry, which includes Swatch and TAG Heuer among others.

=== Controversy ===
In October 2024, the Apple Watch Series 10 received a sales ban in Indonesia, as an extension of the iPhone 16's sales ban. The ban is due to Apple's failure to meet a 40% quota requirement for local component certification implemented by the Indonesian government, according to minister of industry Agus Gumiwang Kartasasmita.

== Intellectual property disputes ==
In December 2019, Joseph Wiesel, a New York University cardiologist, sued Apple over allegations that the Apple Watch violates a patented method for detecting atrial fibrillation. Wiesel stated he had shared details of the patent with Apple in September 2017; the company refused to negotiate.

Following Apple's announcement of the Series 7, Kosta Eleftheriou, an independent software developer, filed a lawsuit against Apple alleging inappropriate copying of the software keyboard functionality from an app that Apple had previously rejected from its App Store.

In October 2023, the United States International Trade Commission (ITC) ruled that Apple Watch products infringed patents for light-based pulse oximetry that are owned by medical technology company Masimo. The company alleged that Apple had approached Masimo with offers to acquire or otherwise partner with the company, and went on to poach engineers from Masimo to develop the infringing technology after it declined the offers. This ruling would allow the ITC to impose an import ban, provided it is not overruled by presidential veto power within a 60-day review period ending December 25. Apple denied the allegations, stating that it had solicited partnerships with multiple vendors, declined to work with Masimo because they were not in the consumer market, and accused Masimo of attempting to "use the ITC to keep a potentially lifesaving product from millions of US consumers while making way for their own watch that copies Apple."

On December 18, 2023, Apple began to halt sales of the Apple Watch Series 9 and Ultra 2 in the United States. On December 27, 2023, the United States Court of Appeals for the Federal Circuit granted a stay on the import ban pending an appeal. On January 12, 2024, Masimo disclosed that the ITC had approved modifications to the products that would remove the infringing technology. Blood oxygen monitoring is not available on the Apple Watch Series 9 and Ultra 2 models sold in the United States after January 18, 2024, designated by part numbers ending in "LW/A".

On August 14, 2025, Apple announced the return of blood oxygen monitoring to models affected by the import ban. They were able to do this by "redesigning" the feature to use the sensors on the watch and process them on the paired iPhone. The results would then be viewable in the Health app. That same day, they released iOS 18.6.1 and watchOS 11.6.1, returning the feature. On August 19, 2025, the same changes were brought to the iOS 26 and watchOS 26 codebase with developer beta 7.

== Comparison of models ==
=== Life cycle ===
Legend	Discontinued and unsupported	Discontinued and supported	Current	Upcoming

Model	Announced	Release		Discontinued	Latest release		Support lifespan
Model	Announced	OS	Date	Discontinued	OS	Date	Support lifespan
1st	September 9, 2014	watchOS 1.0	April 24, 2015	September 7, 2016	watchOS 4.3.2 (Note: watchOS 4.3.2 requires iOS version 11.4, but a higher version of iOS can still pair with a watchOS 4 watch.)	September 17, 2018	3 years, 4 months
Series 1	September 7, 2016	watchOS 3.0	September 12, 2016	September 12, 2018	watchOS 6.3.1 (Note: watchOS 6.3 requires iOS version 13.5, but iOS 14 can still pair with a watchOS 6 watch.) (Note: In 2026, Apple released updates for older watchOS versions to extend certificates used for features such as Facetime, iMessage, and device activation on discontinued Apple Watch models.)	February 2, 2026	4 years
Series 2	September 7, 2016	watchOS 3.0	September 16, 2016	September 12, 2017	watchOS 6.3.1	February 2, 2026	3 years, 11 months
Series 3	September 12, 2017	watchOS 4.0	September 22, 2017	September 7, 2022	watchOS 8.8.2 (Note: watchOS 8.7.1 requires iOS version 15.6, but iOS 16 can still pair with a watchOS 8 watch.)	March 24, 2026	4 years, 11 months
Series 4	September 12, 2018	watchOS 5.0	September 21, 2018	September 10, 2019	watchOS 10.6.2	February 2, 2026	5 years, 11 months
Series 5	September 10, 2019	watchOS 6.0	September 20, 2019	September 15, 2020	watchOS 10.6.2	February 2, 2026	4 years, 11 months
SE (1st)	September 15, 2020	watchOS 7.0	September 18, 2020	September 7, 2022	watchOS 10.6.2	February 2, 2026	3 years, 11 months
Series 6	September 15, 2020	watchOS 7.0	September 18, 2020	September 14, 2021	watchOS 26.6.1	November 9, 2026	5 years, 11 months
Series 7	September 14, 2021	watchOS 8.0	October 15, 2021	September 7, 2022	watchOS 26.6.1	November 9, 2026	4 years, 10 months
SE (2nd)	September 7, 2022	watchOS 9.0	September 16, 2022	September 9, 2025	watchOS 26.6.1	November 9, 2026	3 years, 11 months
Series 8	September 7, 2022	watchOS 9.0	September 16, 2022	September 12, 2023	watchOS 26.6.1	November 9, 2026	3 years, 11 months
Ultra	September 7, 2022	watchOS 9.0	September 23, 2022	September 12, 2023	watchOS 26.6.1	November 9, 2026	3 years, 11 months
Series 9	September 12, 2023	watchOS 10.0	September 22, 2023	September 9, 2024	Latest watchOS watchOS 27.0	Supported	3 years, 1 month +
Ultra 2	September 12, 2023	watchOS 10.0	September 22, 2023	September 9, 2025	Latest watchOS watchOS 27.0	Supported	3 years, 1 month +
Series 10	September 9, 2024	watchOS 11.0	September 20, 2024	September 9, 2025	Latest watchOS watchOS 27.0	Supported	2 years, 1 month +
SE 3	September 9, 2025	watchOS 26.0	September 19, 2025	In production	Latest watchOS watchOS 27.0	Supported	1 year, 1 month +
Series 11	September 9, 2025	watchOS 26.0	September 19, 2025	September 9, 2026	Latest watchOS watchOS 27.0	Supported	1 year, 1 month +
Ultra 3	September 9, 2025	watchOS 26.0	September 19, 2025	September 9, 2026	Latest watchOS watchOS 27.0	Supported	1 year, 1 month +
Series 12	September 9, 2026	watchOS 27.0	September 18, 2026	In production	Latest watchOS watchOS 27.0	Supported	1 month +
Ultra 4	September 9, 2026	watchOS 27.0	September 18, 2026	In production	Latest watchOS watchOS 27.0	Supported	1 month +

=== Technical specifications ===
Specification		1st	Series 1	Series 2	Series 3	Series 4	Series 5	SE (1st)	Series 6	Series 7	SE (2nd)	Series 8	Ultra	Series 9	Ultra 2	Series 10	SE 3	Series 11	Ultra 3	Series 12	Ultra 4
Resistance	Water	IPX7 splash resistant (up to 1 meter)		ISO 22810:2010 water resistant (up to 50 meters)									ISO 22810:2010 water resistant (up to 100 meters)	ISO 22810:2010 water resistant (up to 50 meters)	ISO 22810:2010 water resistant (up to 100 meters)	ISO 22810:2010 water resistant (up to 50 meters)			ISO 22810:2010 water resistant (up to 100 meters)	ISO 22810:2010 water resistant (up to 50 meters)	ISO 22810:2010 water resistant (up to 100 meters)
Resistance	Dust	—N/a								IP6X dust resistant	—N/a	IP6X dust resistant					—N/a	IP6X dust resistant			
Connectivity	Cellular (LTE / UMTS)	No			eSIM								eSIM	eSIM	eSIM	eSIM			eSIM	eSIM	eSIM
Connectivity	Wireless networking	Wi-Fi (802.11 b/g/n 2.4 GHz)							Wi-Fi (802.11 b/g/n 2.4 GHz and 5 GHz)		Wi-Fi (802.11 b/g/n 2.4 GHz)	Wi-Fi (802.11 b/g/n 2.4 GHz and 5 GHz)					Wi-Fi (802.11 b/g/n 2.4 GHz)	Wi-Fi (802.11 b/g/n 2.4 GHz and 5 GHz)			
Connectivity	Bluetooth	Bluetooth 4.0			Bluetooth 4.2	Bluetooth 5.0					Bluetooth 5.3										
Connectivity	Ultra-wideband	No							U1 chip		No	U1 chip		Second-generation			No	Second-generation			
Connectivity	Satellite navigation	No		GPS and GLONASS	GPS, GLONASS, Galileo, and QZSS					GPS, GLONASS, Galileo, QZSS, and BeiDou	GPS, GLONASS, Galileo, and QZSS	GPS, GLONASS, Galileo, QZSS, and BeiDou									GPS, Galileo, and QZSS, and BeiDou
Sensors	Optical heart sensor	1st generation				2nd generation			3rd generation		2nd generation	3rd generation					2nd generation	3rd generation		Always-on	
Sensors	Electrical heart sensor (ECG/EKG)	No				Yes		No	Yes		No	Yes					No	Yes		Second-generation	
Sensors	Blood oxygen sensor	No							Yes		No	Yes		Yes			No	Yes			
Sensors	Temperature sensor	No										Yes									
Sensors	Accelerometer	16g				32g					High-g										
Sensors	Gyroscope	Yes				Improved					High dynamic range										
Sensors	Ambient light sensor	Yes																			
Sensors	Altimeter	No			Yes			Always on													
Sensors	Compass	No					Yes														
Input and display	"Siri Speaks" and "Raise to Speak"	No			Yes																
Input and display	Display type	OLED Retina				LTPO OLED Retina	LTPO OLED Always-on Retina	LTPO OLED Retina	LTPO OLED Always-on Retina		LTPO OLED Retina	LTPO OLED Always-on Retina	LTPO2 OLED Always-on Retina	LTPO OLED Always-on Retina	LTPO2 OLED Always-on Retina	LTPO3 OLED Always-on Retina	LTPO OLED Always-on Retina	LTPO3 OLED Always-on Retina			
Input and display	Force Touch	Yes						No													
Input and display	Brightness (nits)	450		1000									2000		3000	2000	1000	2000	3000	2000	3000
Input and display	Pixel density	326 ppi																			
Input and display	Small diagonal size and resolution	38 mm: 1.337in 272×340 pixels				40 mm: 1.565in 324×394 pixels (Note: Viewable area reduced by rounded corners)				41 mm: 1.705in 352×430 pixels	40 mm: 1.565in 324×394 pixels	41 mm: 1.705in 352×430 pixels	1.988in 410×502 pixels	41 mm: 1.705in 352×430 pixels	1.988in 410×502 pixels	42 mm: 1.786in 374×446 pixels	40 mm: 1.565in 324×394 pixels	42 mm: 1.786in 374×446 pixels	2.04in 422×514 pixels	42 mm: 1.786in 374×446 pixels	2.04in 422×514 pixels
Input and display	Large diagonal size and resolution	42 mm: 1.533in 312×390 pixels				44 mm: 1.778in 368×448 pixels				45 mm: 1.918in 396×484 pixels	44 mm: 1.778in 368×448 pixels	45 mm: 1.918in 396×484 pixels	1.988in 410×502 pixels	45 mm: 1.918in 396×484 pixels	1.988in 410×502 pixels	46 mm: 1.986in 416×496 pixels	44 mm: 1.778in 368×448 pixels	46 mm: 1.986in 416×496 pixels	2.04in 422×514 pixels	46 mm: 1.986in 416×496 pixels	2.04in 422×514 pixels
Chipset	System in Package	Apple S1	Apple S1P	Apple S2	Apple S3	Apple S4	Apple S5		Apple S6	Apple S7	Apple S8			Apple S9		Apple S10				Apple S11	
Chipset	CPU	520 MHz 32-bit single-core	520 MHz 32-bit dual-core		32-bit dual-core	64-bit dual-core Tempest			64-bit dual-core Thunder					64-bit dual-core Sawtooth						64-bit dual-core	
Chipset	Storage	8 GB			GPS: 8 GB; GPS + Cellular: 16 GB	16 GB	32 GB							64 GB							
Chipset	RAM	512 MB DRAM			768 MB DRAM	1 GB DRAM								2 GB DRAM						4 GB DRAM	
OS	Initial	watchOS 1.0	watchOS 3.0		watchOS 4.0	watchOS 5.0	watchOS 6.0	watchOS 7.0		watchOS 8.0	watchOS 9.0			watchOS 10.0		watchOS 11.0	watchOS 26.0			watchOS 27.0	
OS	Latest	watchOS 4.3.2	watchOS 6.3.1		watchOS 8.8.2	watchOS 10.6.2			watchOS 26.6					watchOS 27.0.1							
OS	Minimum devices and iOS	iPhone 5 iOS 8.2	iPhone 5 iOS 10		GPS: iPhone 5S iOS 11 GPS + Cellular: iPhone 6 iOS 11	GPS: iPhone 5S iOS 12 GPS + Cellular: iPhone 6 iOS 12	iPhone 6s iOS 13	iPhone 6s iOS 14		iPhone 6s iOS 15	iPhone 8 iOS 16			iPhone XS iOS 17		iPhone XS iOS 18	iPhone 11 iOS 26			iPhone 11 iOS 27	
Battery	Small case capacity	205 mA·h, 3.8 V, 0.78 W·h		273 mA·h, 3.77 V, 1.03 W·h	GPS: 262 mA·h, 3.81 V, 1.00 W·h	224.9 mA·h, 3.81 V, 0.858 W·h	245 mA·h, 3.85 V, 0.944 W·h		265.9 mA·h, 3.85 V, 1.024 W·h	284.2 mA·h, 3.85 V, 1.094 W·h	GPS: 209 mA·h, 3.86 V, 0.807 W·h	284 mA·h, 3.85 V, 1.094 W·h	542 mA·h, 3.86 V, 2.094 W·h	282 mA·h, 3.87 V, 1.091 W·h	564 mA·h, 3.86 V, 2.178 W·h	290 mA·h, 3.86 V, 1.118 W·h	263 mAh, 3.866 V, 1.017 W·h	322 mA·h, 3.865 V, 1.245 W·h	599 mA·h, 3.86 V, 2.313 W·h	1.261 W·h	631 mA·h, 3.873 V, 2.444 W·h
Battery	Small case capacity	205 mA·h, 3.8 V, 0.78 W·h		273 mA·h, 3.77 V, 1.03 W·h	GPS + Cellular: 279 mA·h, 3.82 V, 1.07 W·h	224.9 mA·h, 3.81 V, 0.858 W·h	245 mA·h, 3.85 V, 0.944 W·h		265.9 mA·h, 3.85 V, 1.024 W·h	284.2 mA·h, 3.85 V, 1.094 W·h	GPS + Cellular: 245 mA·h, 3.85 V, 0.944 W·h	284 mA·h, 3.85 V, 1.094 W·h	542 mA·h, 3.86 V, 2.094 W·h	282 mA·h, 3.87 V, 1.091 W·h	564 mA·h, 3.86 V, 2.178 W·h	290 mA·h, 3.86 V, 1.118 W·h	263 mAh, 3.866 V, 1.017 W·h	322 mA·h, 3.865 V, 1.245 W·h	599 mA·h, 3.86 V, 2.313 W·h	1.261 W·h	631 mA·h, 3.873 V, 2.444 W·h
Battery	Large case capacity	246 mA·h, 3.78 V, 0.93 W·h		334 mA·h, 3.8 V, 1.27 W·h	GPS: 342 mA·h, 3.82 V, 1.31 W·h	291.8 mA·h, 3.81 V, 1.113 W·h	296 mA·h, 3.814 V, 1.129 W·h		303.8 mA·h, 3.85 V, 1.17 W·h	308.8 mA·h, 3.85 V, 1.189 W·h	296 mA·h, 3.814 V, 1.129 W·h	308 mA·h, 3.86 V, 1.19 W·h	542 mA·h, 3.86 V, 2.094 W·h	308 mA·h, 3.86 V, 1.19 W·h	564 mA·h, 3.86 V, 2.178 W·h	327 mA·h, 3.87 V, 1.266 W·h	330 mA·h, 3.864 V, 1.276 W·h	363 mA·h, 3.865 V, 1.403 W·h	599 mA·h, 3.86 V, 2.313 W·h	377 mA·h, 3.875 V, 1.461 W·h	631 mA·h, 3.873 V, 2.444 W·h
Battery	Large case capacity	246 mA·h, 3.78 V, 0.93 W·h		334 mA·h, 3.8 V, 1.27 W·h	GPS + Cellular: 352 mA·h, 3.82 V, 1.34 W·h	291.8 mA·h, 3.81 V, 1.113 W·h	296 mA·h, 3.814 V, 1.129 W·h		303.8 mA·h, 3.85 V, 1.17 W·h	308.8 mA·h, 3.85 V, 1.189 W·h	296 mA·h, 3.814 V, 1.129 W·h	308 mA·h, 3.86 V, 1.19 W·h	542 mA·h, 3.86 V, 2.094 W·h	308 mA·h, 3.86 V, 1.19 W·h	564 mA·h, 3.86 V, 2.178 W·h	327 mA·h, 3.87 V, 1.266 W·h	330 mA·h, 3.864 V, 1.276 W·h	363 mA·h, 3.865 V, 1.403 W·h	599 mA·h, 3.86 V, 2.313 W·h	377 mA·h, 3.875 V, 1.461 W·h	631 mA·h, 3.873 V, 2.444 W·h
Battery	Charge times	—N/a			~1.5 hours to 80% ~2 hours to 100%		~1.5 hours to 80% ~2.5 hours to 100%		~1 hour to 80% ~1.5 hours to 100%	~45 minutes to 80% ~75 minutes to 100%	~1.5 hours to 80% ~2.5 hours to 100%	~45 minutes to 80% ~75 minutes to 100%	~1 hour to 80% ~1.5 hours to 100%	~45 minutes to 80%	~1 hour to 80%	~30 minutes to 80%	~45 minutes to 80%	~30 minutes to 80%	~45 minutes to 80%	~30 minutes to 80%	~45 minutes to 80%
Battery	Battery life	24h				18h							36h	18h	36h	18h		24h	42h	24h	50h
Greenhouse gas emissions		50 kg CO_{2}e	20 kg CO_{2}e	30 kg CO_{2}e	GPS: 28 kg CO_{2}e; GPS + Cellular: 36 kg CO_{2}e	GPS: 38 kg CO_{2}e; GPS + Cellular: 39 kg CO_{2}e	40 kg CO_{2}e	35 kg CO_{2}e	36 kg CO_{2}e	34 kg CO_{2}e	31 kg CO_{2}e	33 kg CO_{2}e	56 kg CO_{2}e	8.1 kg CO_{2}e (Aluminum); 29 kg CO_{2}e (Stainless steel)	12 kg CO_{2}e	8.3 kg CO_{2}e	8.2 kg CO_{2}e	8.1 kg CO_{2}e	11 kg CO_{2}e	10 kg CO_{2}e	13 kg CO_{2}e
Dates	Introduced	September 9, 2014	September 7, 2016		September 12, 2017	September 12, 2018	September 10, 2019	September 15, 2020		September 14, 2021	September 7, 2022			September 12, 2023		September 9, 2024	September 9, 2025			September 9, 2026	
Dates	Released	April 24, 2015	September 12, 2016	September 16, 2016	September 22, 2017	September 21, 2018	September 25, 2019	September 18, 2020		October 15, 2021	September 16, 2022		September 23, 2022	September 22, 2023		September 20, 2024	September 19, 2025			September 18, 2026	
Dates	Discontinued	September 7, 2016	September 12, 2018	September 12, 2017	September 7, 2022	September 10, 2019	September 15, 2020	September 7, 2022	October 8, 2021	September 7, 2022	September 9, 2025	September 12, 2023		September 9, 2024	September 9, 2025		In production	September 9, 2026		In production	
Dates	Unsupported	September 17, 2018	December 14, 2020		September 12, 2022	September 16, 2024			September 14, 2026					Current							
Model numbers		A1553 (38 mm); A1554 (42 mm)	A1802 (38 mm); A1803 (42 mm)	A1757 (38 mm); A1758 (42 mm) Edition: A1816 (38 mm); A1817 (42 mm)	GPS: A1858 (38 mm); A1859 (42 mm) GPS + Cellular: Americas: A1860 (38 mm); A1861 (42 mm) Europe and Asia Pacific: A1889 (38 mm); A1891 (42 mm) China mainland: A1890 (38 mm); A1892 (42 mm)	GPS: A1977 (40 mm); A1978 (44 mm) GPS + Cellular: North America: A1975 (40 mm); A1976 (44 mm) Europe, Asia Pacific, and China mainland: A2007 (40 mm); A2008 (44 mm)	GPS: A2092 (40 mm); A2093 (44 mm) GPS + Cellular: North America: A2094 (40 mm); A2095 (44 mm) Europe, Asia Pacific, and China mainland: A2156 (40 mm); A2157 (44 mm)	GPS: A2351 (40 mm); A2352 (44 mm) GPS + Cellular: North America: A2353 (40 mm); A2354 (44 mm) Europe, Asia Pacific, and China mainland: A2355 (40 mm); A2356 (44 mm)	GPS: A2291 (40 mm); A2292 (44 mm) GPS + Cellular: North America: A2293 (40 mm); A2294 (44 mm) Europe, Asia Pacific, and China mainland: A2375 (40 mm); A2376 (44 mm)	GPS: A2473 (41 mm); A2474 (45 mm) GPS + Cellular: North America: A2475 (41 mm); A2477 (45 mm) Europe, Asia Pacific, and China mainland: A2476 (41 mm); A2478 (45 mm)	GPS: A2722 (40 mm); A2723 (44 mm) GPS + Cellular: North America: A2726 (40 mm); A2727 (44 mm) Europe, Asia Pacific: A2725 (40 mm); A2724 (44 mm); China mainland: A2855 (40 mm); A2856 (44 mm)	GPS: A2770 (41 mm); A2771 (45 mm) GPS + Cellular: North America: A2772 (41 mm); A2774 (45 mm) Europe, Asia Pacific: A2773 (41 mm); A2775 (45 mm); China mainland: A2857 (41 mm); A2858 (45 mm)	North America: A2622; Europe, Asia Pacific: A2684 China mainland: A2859	GPS: A2978 (41 mm); A2980 (45 mm) GPS + Cellular: North America, Europe, Asia Pacific: A2982 (41 mm); A2984 (45 mm) China mainland: A2983 (41 mm); A2985 (45 mm)	North America, Europe, Asia Pacific: A2986 China mainland: A2987	GPS: North America, Europe, Asia Pacific: A2997 (42 mm); A2999 (46 mm) China mainland, Indonesia: A2998 (42 mm); A3000 (46 mm) GPS + Cellular: North America, Europe, Asia Pacific: A3001 (42 mm); A3003 (46 mm) China mainland, Indonesia: A3002 (42 mm) A3006 (46 mm)	GPS: North America, Europe, Asia Pacific: A3324 (40 mm); A3325 (42 mm) China mainland: A3391 (40 mm); A3392 (44 mm) GPS + Cellular: North America, Europe, Asia Pacific: A3326 (40 mm); A3328 (44 mm) China mainland: A3327 (40 mm) A3329 (44 mm)	GPS: North America, Europe, Asia Pacific: A3331 (42 mm); A3333 (46 mm) China mainland: A3450 (42 mm); A3451 (46 mm) GPS + Cellular: North America, Europe, Asia Pacific: A3335 (42 mm); A3337 (46 mm) China mainland: A3452 (42 mm) A3453 (46 mm)	North America, Europe, Asia Pacific: A3281 China mainland: A3282	GPS: North America, Europe, Asia Pacific: A3581 (42 mm); A3584 (46 mm) China mainland: A3583 (42 mm); A3585 (46 mm) GPS + Cellular: North America, Europe, Asia Pacific: A3582 (42 mm); A3587 (46 mm) China mainland: A3586 (42 mm) A3588 (46 mm)	North America, Europe, Asia Pacific: A3579 China mainland: A3580
Starting price (US) small / large	Base model (Aluminum)	$349 / $399	$269	$369	GPS: $329 / 359; GPS + Cellular: $399	GPS: $399 / $429; GPS + Cellular: $499 / $529		GPS: $279 / $309; GPS + Cellular: $329 / $359	GPS: $399 / $429; GPS + Cellular: $499 / $529		GPS: $249 / $279; GPS + Cellular: $279 / $329	GPS: $399 / $429; GPS + Cellular: $499 / $529	—N/a	GPS: $399 / $429; GPS + Cellular: $499 / $529	—N/a	GPS: $399 / $429; GPS + Cellular: $499 / $529	GPS: $249 / $279; GPS + Cellular: $279 / $329	GPS: $399 / $429; GPS + Cellular: $499 / $529	—N/a	GPS: $399 / $449; GPS + Cellular: $499 / $549	—N/a
Starting price (US) small / large	Stainless steel	$549 / $599	—N/a	$549	$749 / $799	$699 / $749		—N/a	$699 / $749		—N/a	$699 / $749	—N/a	$699 / $749	—N/a	—N/a	—N/a	—N/a	—N/a	—N/a	—N/a
Starting price (US) small / large	Titanium	—N/a	—N/a	—N/a							—N/a	—N/a	$799	—N/a	$799	$699 / $749	—N/a	$699 / $749	$799	$699 / $749	$799
Starting price (US) small / large	Ceramic	—N/a	—N/a	—N/a							—N/a	—N/a	—N/a	—N/a	—N/a		—N/a	—N/a		$899 / $949	—N/a
Starting price (US) small / large	Nike+	—N/a	—N/a	$369	GPS: $329	$399		$279	$399		—N/a	—N/a	—N/a	—N/a	—N/a		—N/a	—N/a		—N/a	—N/a
Starting price (US) small / large	Hermès	—N/a	—N/a	$1,149	$1,149	$1,249		—N/a	$1,229		—N/a	$1,229	—N/a	$1,249 / $1,299	$1,399	$1,249 / $1,299	—N/a	$1,249 / $1,299	$1,399	$1,399 / $1,449	$1,499
Starting price (US) small / large	Edition	$10,000 / $12,000	—N/a	$1,249 / $1,299	$1,299 / $1,349	—N/a	$799 (Titanium) $1,299 (Ceramic)	—N/a	$799		—N/a	—N/a	—N/a	—N/a			—N/a	—N/a			

=== Physical specifications ===
Series		Small						Large					
Series		Aluminum	Stainless Steel	Titanium	Ceramic	Edition (Note: 18K gold (1st gen), Ceramic (Series 2/3/5), or Titanium (Series 5/6/7) body. Apple dropped the "Edition" moniker with the release of Series 8.)	Image	Aluminum	Stainless Steel	Titanium	Ceramic	Edition (Note: 18K gold (1st gen), Ceramic (Series 2/3/5), or Titanium (Series 5/6/7) body. Apple dropped the "Edition" moniker with the release of Series 8.)	Image
1st	H	38.6 mm (1.52 in)		—		38.6 mm (1.52 in)		42.0 mm (1.65 in)		—		42.0 mm (1.65 in)	
1st	W	33.3 mm (1.31 in)		—		33.3 mm (1.31 in)		35.9 mm (1.41 in)		—		35.9 mm (1.41 in)	
1st	D	10.5 mm (0.41 in)		—		10.5 mm (0.41 in)		10.5 mm (0.41 in)		—		10.5 mm (0.41 in)	
1st	Weight	25 g (0.88 oz)	40 g (1.4 oz)	—		54–55 g (1.9–1.9 oz)		30 g (1.1 oz)	50 g (1.8 oz)	—		67–69 g (2.4–2.4 oz)	
Series 1	H	38.6 mm (1.52 in)	—					42.5 mm (1.67 in)	—				
Series 1	W	33.3 mm (1.31 in)	—					36.4 mm (1.43 in)	—				
Series 1	D	10.5 mm (0.41 in)	—					10.5 mm (0.41 in)	—				
Series 1	Weight	25 g (0.88 oz)	—					30 g (1.1 oz)	—				
Series 2	H	38.6 mm (1.52 in)		—		39.2 mm (1.54 in)		42.5 mm (1.67 in)		—		42.6 mm (1.68 in)	
Series 2	W	33.3 mm (1.31 in)		—		34.0 mm (1.34 in)		36.4 mm (1.43 in)		—		36.5 mm (1.44 in)	
Series 2	D	11.4 mm (0.45 in)		—		11.8 mm (0.46 in)		11.4 mm (0.45 in)		—		11.8 mm (0.46 in)	
Series 2	Weight	28.2 g (0.99 oz)	41.9 g (1.48 oz)	—		39.6 g (1.40 oz)		34.2 g (1.21 oz)	52.4 g (1.85 oz)	—		45.6 g (1.61 oz)	
Series 3	H	38.6 mm (1.52 in)		—		39.2 mm (1.54 in)		42.5 mm (1.67 in)		—		42.6 mm (1.68 in)	
Series 3	W	33.3 mm (1.31 in)		—		34.0 mm (1.34 in)		36.4 mm (1.43 in)		—		36.5 mm (1.44 in)	
Series 3	D	11.4 mm (0.45 in)		—		11.8 mm (0.46 in)		11.4 mm (0.45 in)		—		11.8 mm (0.46 in)	
Series 3	Weight	26.7–28.7 g (0.94–1.01 oz)	42.4 g (1.50 oz)	—		40.1 g (1.41 oz)		32.3–34.9 g (1.14–1.23 oz)	52.8 g (1.86 oz)	—		46.4 g (1.64 oz)	
Series 4	H	40 mm (1.6 in)		—				44 mm (1.7 in)		—			
Series 4	W	34 mm (1.3 in)		—				38 mm (1.5 in)		—			
Series 4	D	10.7 mm (0.42 in)		—				10.7 mm (0.42 in)		—			
Series 4	Weight	30.1 g (1.06 oz)	39.8 g (1.40 oz)	—				36.7 g (1.29 oz)	47.9 g (1.69 oz)	—			
Series 5	H	40 mm (1.6 in)		—		40 mm (1.6 in)		44 mm (1.7 in)		—		44 mm (1.7 in)	
Series 5	W	34 mm (1.3 in)		—		34 mm (1.3 in)		38 mm (1.5 in)		—		38 mm (1.5 in)	
Series 5	D	10.74 mm (0.423 in)		—		10.74 mm (0.423 in)		10.74 mm (0.423 in)		—		10.74 mm (0.423 in)	
Series 5	Weight	30.8 g (1.09 oz)	40.6 g (1.43 oz)	—		35.1 / 39.7 g (1.24 / 1.40 oz) Ti/C		36.5 g (1.29 oz)	47.8 g (1.69 oz)	—		41.7 / 46.7 g (1.47 / 1.65 oz) Ti/C	
SE (1st)	H	40 mm (1.6 in)	—					44 mm (1.7 in)	—				
SE (1st)	W	34 mm (1.3 in)	—					38 mm (1.5 in)	—				
SE (1st)	D	10.7 mm (0.42 in)	—					10.7 mm (0.42 in)	—				
SE (1st)	Weight	30.49–30.68 g (1.076–1.082 oz)	—					36.20–36.36 g (1.277–1.283 oz)	—				
Series 6	H	40 mm (1.6 in)		—		40 mm (1.6 in)		44 mm (1.7 in)		—		44 mm (1.7 in)	
Series 6	W	34 mm (1.3 in)		—		34 mm (1.3 in)		38 mm (1.5 in)		—		38 mm (1.5 in)	
Series 6	D	10.7 mm (0.42 in)		—		10.7 mm (0.42 in)		10.7 mm (0.42 in)		—		10.7 mm (0.42 in)	
Series 6	Weight	30.5 g (1.08 oz)	39.7 g (1.40 oz)	—		34.6 g (1.22 oz)		36.5 g (1.29 oz)	47.1 g (1.66 oz)	—		41.3 g (1.46 oz)	
Series 7	H	41 mm (1.6 in)		—		41 mm (1.6 in)		45 mm (1.8 in)		—		45 mm (1.8 in)	
Series 7	W	35 mm (1.4 in)		—		35 mm (1.4 in)		38 mm (1.5 in)		—		38 mm (1.5 in)	
Series 7	D	10.7 mm (0.42 in)		—		10.7 mm (0.42 in)		10.7 mm (0.42 in)		—		10.7 mm (0.42 in)	
Series 7	Weight	32.0 g (1.13 oz)	42.3 g (1.49 oz)	—		37 g (1.3 oz)		38.8 g (1.37 oz)	51.5 g (1.82 oz)	—		45.1 g (1.59 oz)	
SE (2nd)	H	40 mm (1.6 in)	—					44 mm (1.7 in)	—				
SE (2nd)	W	34 mm (1.3 in)	—					38 mm (1.5 in)	—				
SE (2nd)	D	10.7 mm (0.42 in)	—					10.7 mm (0.42 in)	—				
SE (2nd)	Weight	26.4–27.8 g (0.93–0.98 oz)	—					32.9–33.0 g (1.16–1.16 oz)	—				
Series 8	H	41 mm (1.6 in)		—				45 mm (1.8 in)		—			
Series 8	W	35 mm (1.4 in)		—				38 mm (1.5 in)		—			
Series 8	D	10.7 mm (0.42 in)		—				10.7 mm (0.42 in)		—			
Series 8	Weight	31.9–32.2 g (1.13–1.14 oz)	42.3 g (1.49 oz)	—				38.8–39.1 g (1.37–1.38 oz)	51.5 g (1.82 oz)	—			
Ultra	H	—						49 mm (1.9 in)					
Ultra	W	—						44 mm (1.7 in)					
Ultra	D	—						12 mm (0.47 in)					
Ultra	Weight	—						61.3 g (2.16 oz)					
Series 9	H	41 mm (1.6 in)		—				45 mm (1.8 in)		—			
Series 9	W	35 mm (1.4 in)		—				38 mm (1.5 in)		—			
Series 9	D	10.7 mm (0.42 in)		—				10.7 mm (0.42 in)		—			
Series 9	Weight	31.9–32.1 g (1.13–1.13 oz)	42.3 g (1.49 oz)	—				38.7–39 g (1.37–1.38 oz)	51.5 g (1.82 oz)	—			
Ultra 2	H	—						49 mm (1.9 in)					
Ultra 2	W	—						44 mm (1.7 in)					
Ultra 2	D	—						12 mm (0.47 in)					
Ultra 2	Weight	—						61.4–61.8 g (2.17–2.18 oz)					
Series 10	H	42 mm (1.7 in)	—	42 mm (1.7 in)	—			46 mm (1.8 in)	—	46 mm (1.8 in)	—		
Series 10	W	36 mm (1.4 in)	—	36 mm (1.4 in)	—			39 mm (1.5 in)	—	39 mm (1.5 in)	—		
Series 10	D	9.7 mm (0.38 in)	—	9.7 mm (0.38 in)	—			9.7 mm (0.38 in)	—	9.7 mm (0.38 in)	—		
Series 10	Weight	29.3–30 g (1.03–1.06 oz)	—	34.4 g (1.21 oz)	—			35.3–36.4 g (1.25–1.28 oz)	—	41.7 g (1.47 oz)	—		
SE 3	H	40 mm (1.6 in)	—					44 mm (1.7 in)	—				
SE 3	W	34 mm (1.3 in)	—					38 mm (1.5 in)	—				
SE 3	D	10.7 mm (0.42 in)	—					10.7 mm (0.42 in)	—				
SE 3	Weight	26.3–26.4 g (0.93–0.93 oz)	—					32.9–33.0 g (1.16–1.16 oz)	—				
Series 11	H	42 mm (1.7 in)	—	42 mm (1.7 in)	—			46 mm (1.8 in)	—	46 mm (1.8 in)	—		
Series 11	W	36 mm (1.4 in)	—	36 mm (1.4 in)	—			39 mm (1.5 in)	—	39 mm (1.5 in)	—		
Series 11	D	9.7 mm (0.38 in)	—	9.7 mm (0.38 in)	—			9.7 mm (0.38 in)	—	9.7 mm (0.38 in)	—		
Series 11	Weight	29.7–30.3 g (1.05–1.07 oz)	—	34.6 g (1.22 oz)	—			36.9–37.8 g (1.30–1.33 oz)	—	43.1 g (1.52 oz)	—		
Ultra 3	H	—						49 mm (1.9 in)					
Ultra 3	W	—						44 mm (1.7 in)					
Ultra 3	D	—						12 mm (0.47 in)					
Ultra 3	Weight	—						61.6–61.8 g (2.17–2.18 oz)					
Series 12	H	42 mm (1.7 in)	—	42 mm (1.7 in)	43 mm (1.7 in)	—		46 mm (1.8 in)	—	46 mm (1.8 in)	47 mm (1.9 in)	—	
Series 12	W	37 mm (1.5 in)	—	37 mm (1.5 in)		—		40 mm (1.6 in)	—	40 mm (1.6 in)	41 mm (1.6 in)	—	
Series 12	D	9.7 mm (0.38 in)	—	9.7 mm (0.38 in)	9.85 mm (0.388 in)	—		9.7 mm (0.38 in)	—	9.7 mm (0.38 in)	9.85 mm (0.388 in)	—	
Series 12	Weight	31.5–32.2 g (1.11–1.14 oz)	—	36.5 g (1.29 oz)	41.7–42.8 g (1.47–1.51 oz)	—		38.6–39.5 g (1.36–1.39 oz)	—	44.9 g (1.58 oz)	51.3–52.9 g (1.81–1.87 oz)	—	
Ultra 4	H	—						49 mm (1.9 in)					
Ultra 4	W	—						44 mm (1.7 in)					
Ultra 4	D	—						12 mm (0.47 in)					
Ultra 4	Weight	—						63.0–63.1 g (2.22–2.23 oz)					

=== Collections and materials ===
Series		Watch			Nike+	Hermès	Edition	
1st	Body	"Sport": Aluminum (Silver, Space Gray, Rose Gold, Gold)	Stainless steel (Polished or Space Black)		—N/a	—	18K Gold (Rose or Yellow)	
1st	Crystal	"Sport": Ion-X	Sapphire		—N/a	—	Sapphire	
1st	Back	"Sport": Composite	Ceramic		—N/a	—	Ceramic	
Series 1	Body	Aluminum (Space Gray, Gold, Rose Gold, Silver)			—N/a			
Series 1	Crystal	Ion-X			—N/a			
Series 1	Back	Composite			—N/a			
Series 2	Body	Aluminum (Space Gray, Gold, Rose Gold, Silver)	Stainless steel (Space Black, Polished)		Aluminum (Space Gray, Silver)	Stainless steel (Polished)	Ceramic (White)	
Series 2	Crystal	Ion-X	Sapphire		Ion-X	Sapphire		
Series 2	Back	Ceramic			Ceramic	Ceramic with Hermès logo	Ceramic	
Series 3	Body	Aluminum (Space Gray, Gold, Silver)	Stainless steel (Space Black, Polished)		Aluminum (Space Gray, Silver)	Stainless steel (Polished)	Ceramic (White, Gray)	
Series 3	Crystal	Ion-X	Sapphire		Ion-X	Sapphire		
Series 3	Back	Composite (GPS)	Ceramic		Composite (GPS) with Nike logo	Ceramic with Hermès logo	Ceramic	
Series 3	Back	Ceramic (GPS+LTE)	Ceramic		Ceramic (GPS+LTE) with Nike Logo	Ceramic with Hermès logo	Ceramic	
Series 4	Body	Aluminum (Space Gray, Gold, Silver)	Stainless steel (Polished, Space Black, Gold)		Aluminum (Space Gray, Silver)	Stainless steel (Polished)	—N/a	
Series 4	Crystal	Ion-X	Sapphire		Ion-X	Sapphire	—N/a	
Series 4	Back	Ceramic			Ceramic with Nike logo	Ceramic with Hermès logo	—N/a	
Series 5	Body	Aluminum (Space Gray, Gold, Silver)	Stainless steel (Polished, Space Black, Gold)		Aluminum (Space Gray, Silver)	Stainless steel (Polished, Space Black)	Titanium (Dark, Light)	Ceramic (White)
Series 5	Crystal	Ion-X	Sapphire		Ion-X	Sapphire		
Series 5	Back	Ceramic			Ceramic with Nike logo	Ceramic with Hermès logo	Ceramic	
SE (1st)	Body	Aluminum (Space Gray, Gold, Silver)			Aluminum (Space Gray, Silver)	—N/a		
SE (1st)	Crystal	Ion-X			Ion-X	—N/a		
SE (1st)	Back	Ceramic			Ceramic with Nike logo	—N/a		
Series 6	Body	Aluminum (Space Gray, Gold, Silver, Red, Blue)	Stainless steel (Silver, Graphite, Gold)		Aluminum (Space Gray, Silver)	Stainless steel (Silver, Space Black)	Titanium (Natural, Space Black)	
Series 6	Crystal	Ion-X	Sapphire		Ion-X	Sapphire		
Series 6	Back	Ceramic			Ceramic with Nike logo	Ceramic with Hermès logo	Ceramic	
Series 7	Body	Aluminum (Midnight, Starlight, Green, Blue, Product Red)	Stainless steel (Silver, Graphite, Gold)		Aluminum (Midnight, Starlight)	Stainless steel (Silver, Space Black)	Titanium (Natural, Space Black)	
Series 7	Crystal	Ion-X	Sapphire		Ion-X	Sapphire		
Series 7	Back	Ceramic			Ceramic with Nike logo	Ceramic with Hermès logo	Ceramic	
SE (2nd)	Body	Aluminum (Midnight, Starlight, Silver)			—N/a			
SE (2nd)	Crystal	Ion-X			—N/a			
SE (2nd)	Back	Composite			—N/a			
Series 8	Body	Aluminum (Midnight, Starlight, Silver, Product Red)	Stainless steel (Silver, Graphite, Gold)		—N/a	Stainless steel (Silver, Space Black)	—N/a	
Series 8	Crystal	Ion-X	Sapphire		—N/a	Sapphire	—N/a	
Series 8	Back	Ceramic			—N/a	Ceramic with Hermès logo	—N/a	
Ultra	Body	Titanium			—N/a			
Ultra	Crystal	Sapphire			—N/a			
Ultra	Back	Ceramic			—N/a			
Series 9	Body	Aluminum (Midnight, Starlight, Silver, Pink, Product Red)	Stainless steel (Silver, Graphite, Gold)		—N/a	Stainless steel (Silver, Space Black)	—N/a	
Series 9	Crystal	Ion-X	Sapphire		—N/a	Sapphire	—N/a	
Series 9	Back	Ceramic			—N/a	Ceramic with Hermès logo	—N/a	
Ultra 2	Body	Titanium (Natural, Black)			—N/a	Titanium (Natural)	—N/a	
Ultra 2	Crystal	Sapphire			—N/a	Sapphire	—N/a	
Ultra 2	Back	Ceramic			—N/a	Ceramic with Hermès logo	—N/a	
Series 10	Body	Aluminum (Jet Black, Rose Gold, Silver)	Titanium (Natural, Slate, Gold)		—N/a	Titanium (Silver)	—N/a	
Series 10	Crystal	Ion-X	Sapphire		—N/a	Sapphire	—N/a	
Series 10	Back	Aluminum	Titanium		—N/a	Titanium with Hermès logo	—N/a	
SE 3	Body	Aluminum (Midnight, Starlight)			—N/a			
SE 3	Crystal	Ion-X			—N/a			
SE 3	Back	Composite			—N/a			
Series 11	Body	Aluminum (Jet Black, Rose Gold, Silver, Space Gray)	Titanium (Natural, Slate, Gold)		—N/a	Titanium (Silver)	—N/a	
Series 11	Crystal	Ion-X	Sapphire		—N/a	Sapphire	—N/a	
Series 11	Back	Aluminum	Titanium		—N/a	Titanium with Hermès logo	—N/a	
Ultra 3	Body	Titanium (Natural, Black)			—N/a	Titanium (Natural)	—N/a	
Ultra 3	Crystal	Sapphire			—N/a	Sapphire	—N/a	
Ultra 3	Back	Ceramic			—N/a	Ceramic with Hermès logo	—N/a	
Series 12	Body	Aluminum (Dark Bronze, Light Gold, Black, Space Gray)	Titanium (Radiant Gold, Natural)	Ceramic (Pearl White, Night Blue)	—N/a	Titanium (Radiant Gold, Silver)	—N/a	
Series 12	Crystal	Ceramic Shield 2	Sapphire		—N/a	Sapphire	—N/a	
Series 12	Back	Aluminum	Titanium	Ceramic	—N/a	Titanium with Hermès logo	—N/a	
Ultra 4	Body	Titanium (Natural, Black)			—N/a	Titanium (Natural)	—N/a	
Ultra 4	Crystal	Sapphire			—N/a	Sapphire	—N/a	
Ultra 4	Back	Ceramic			—N/a	Ceramic with Hermès logo	—N/a	

- 1st generation only: Apple Watch was sold as "Apple Watch Sport" (Aluminum body) and "Apple Watch" (Stainless steel body). Later generations sold both body materials as "Apple Watch".

== See also ==
- List of iPhone models
- List of iPad models
