= List of PowerVR products =

Places where PowerVR technology and its various iterations have been used:

== Series1 (NEC) ==
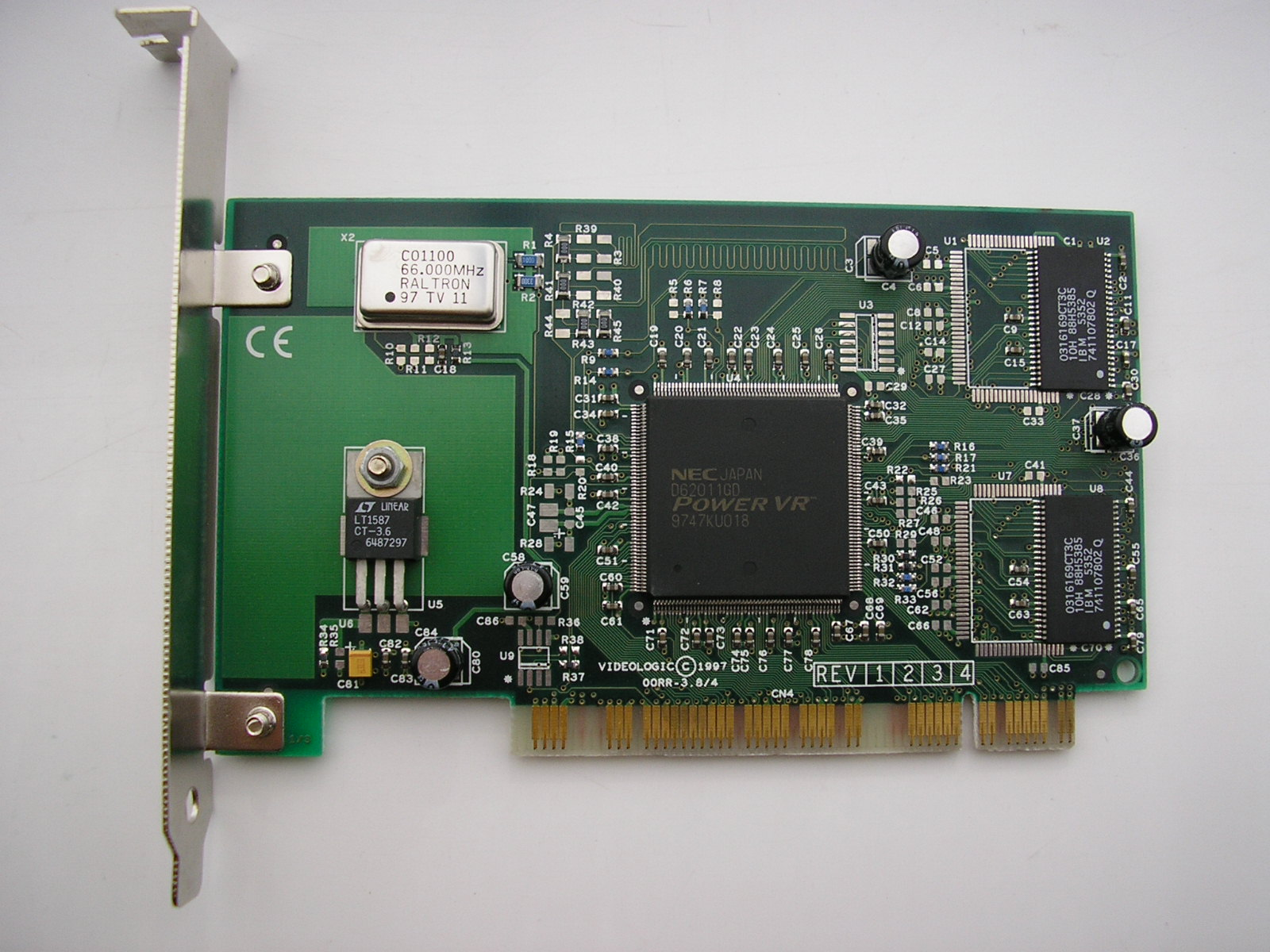
VideoLogic Apocalypse 3Dx (NEC PowerVR PCX2 chip)

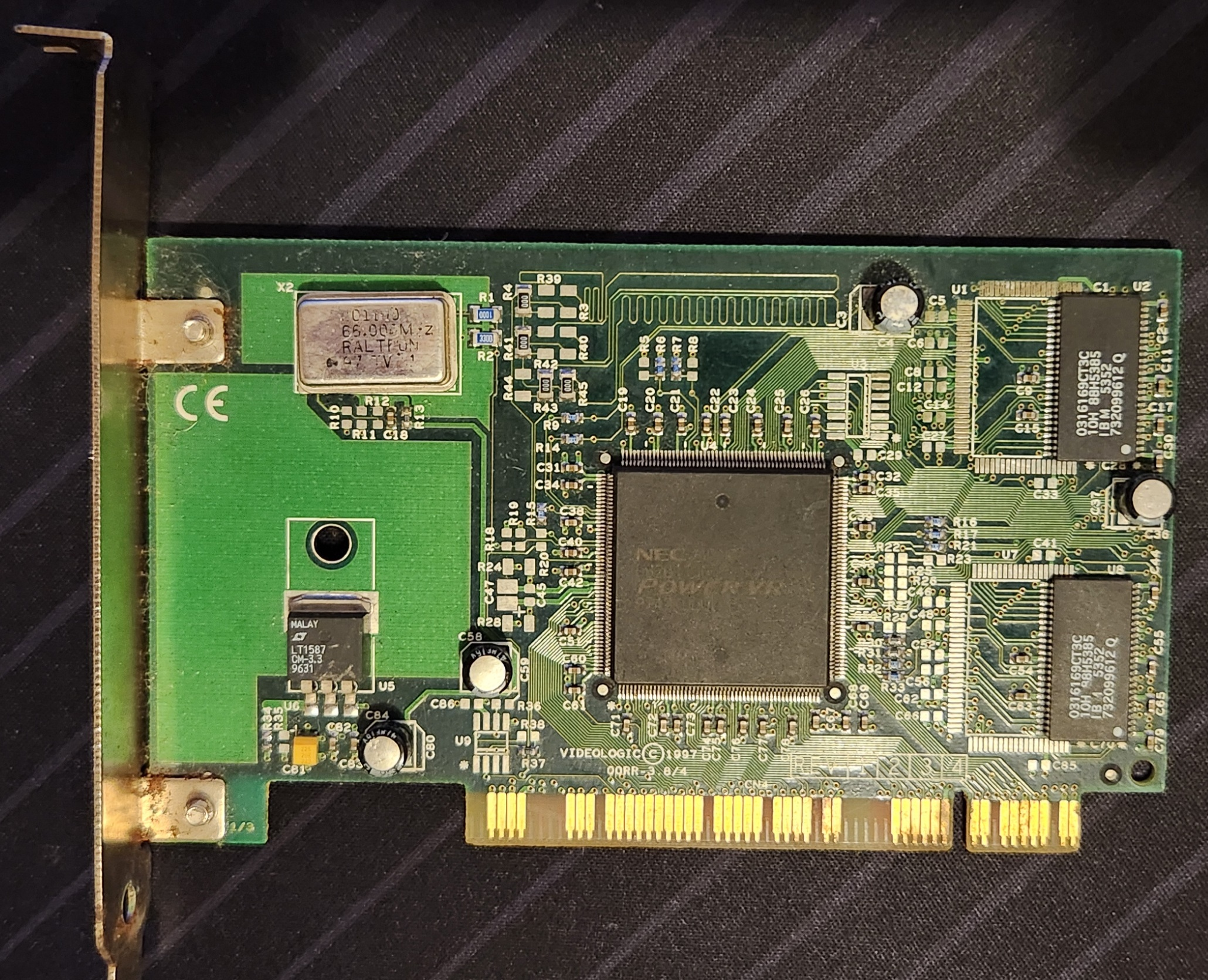
VideoLogic Apocalypse 3Dx (NEC PowerVR PCX2 chip)

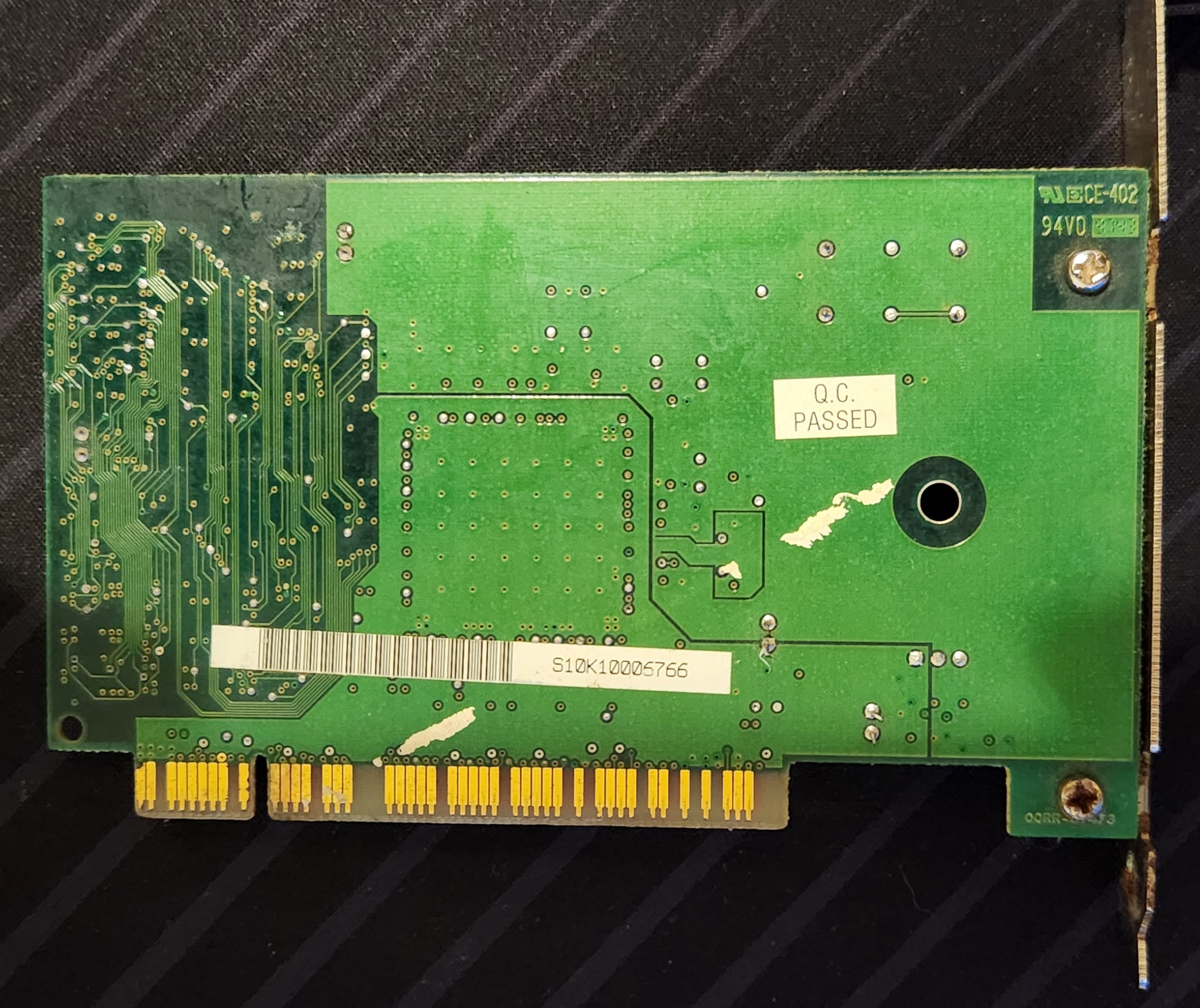
VideoLogic Apocalypse 3Dx (NEC PowerVR PCX2 chip) Back

Product	Chip Name	Clock Rate	Notes
Compaq 3D card	"Midas 3" chip set	66 MHz	Supplied with some Presario systems
Apocalypse 3d/3dx	PCX-1 and PCX-2	60 and 66 MHz	3D PC add-in board
Matrox m3D	PCX-2	66 MHz	3D PC add-in board

== Series2 (NEC) ==
Product	Chip Name	Clock Rate	Notes
Dreamcast	CLX2	100 MHz	Console
Neon250	PowerVR 250PC	125 MHz	2D/3D PC Add-in Board
Sega NAOMI	CLX2	100 MHz	Arcade Machine
Sammy Atomiswave	CLX2	100 MHz	Arcade Machine
Sega NAOMI2	2 CLX2s + ELAN (Transform and Lighting processor)	100 MHz	Arcade Machine

== Series3 (STMicro) ==
Product	Chip Name	Clock Rate	Notes
KYRO	STG4000	115 MHz	2D/3D PC add-in board
KYRO II	STG4500	175 MHz	2D/3D PC add-in board
KYRO IISE	STG4800	200 MHz	2D/3D PC add-in board

== VGX ==
PowerVR VGX150

== Series4 (MBX and MBX Lite) ==
Freescale i.MX31 — MBX Lite + FPU (VFP11) + ARM1136

- DAVE Embedded Systems Qong (SOM)
- ELSA PAL Mini Book e-A533-L
- Garz & Fricke Adelaide
- TQ Components TQMa31
- iCEphone
- LORE Embedded TS1

Freescale i.MX31C — MBX Lite + FPU (VFP11) + ARM1136

- Cogent CSB733 (SOM)
- DAVE Embedded Systems Qong (SOM)

Freescale MPC5121e — MBX Lite + VGP Lite + PowerPC e300

- CherryPal C114
- DAVE Embedded Systems Aria (SOM)
- LimePC range (UMPC, HandheldPC, PalmPC, LimePC HDTV set)
- PhaedruS SystemS CSB781
- GDA Technologies Bali Reference Board

Intel CE 2110 (Olo River) — MBX Lite + XScale CPU

- ASUS set-top boxes
- Chunghwa Telecom Multimedia on Demand set-top boxes
- Digeo Moxi Multi-Room HD Digital Media Recorder
- Digeo Moxi Mate
- Digital Video Networks set-top boxes
- OKI Next Generation Hybrid STB
- ZTE set-top boxes

Marvell 2700G - discontinued - (was Intel 2700G (Marathon)) — MBX Lite + XScale PXA27x CPU

- Advance Tech M.A.G.I.C.
- Advantech UbiQ-350
- Advantech UbiQ-470
- Compulab CM-F82 (PowerPC Module)
- Dell Axim X50v
- Dell Axim X51v
- Dresser Wayne iX
- Gigabyte GSmart t600
- Gigabyte GSmart MW998
- Palm Foleo
- Pepper Pad
- PFU Systems MediaStaff DS

NXP Nexperia PNX4008 — MBX Lite + FPU + ARM926

- Sony Ericsson M600 and M608c
- Sony Ericsson P1i and P1c
- Sony Ericsson P990 and P990c
- Sony Ericsson W950i and W958c
- Sony Ericsson W960i and W960c

NXP Nexperia PNX4009 — MBX Lite + FPU + ARM926

- Sony Ericsson G700 and G700c
- Sony Ericsson G700 Business Edition
- Sony Ericsson G900
- Sony Ericsson 'Paris' P200

Renesas SH3707 — MBX + VGP + FPU + SH-4

- Sega Aurora

Renesas SH-Mobile3 (SH73180), Renesas SH-Mobile3+ (SH73182), Renesas SH-Mobile3A (SH73230), Renesas SH-Mobile3A+ (SH73450) — MBX Lite + VGP Lite + SH-X(SH4AL-DSP)

- Fujitsu F702iD
- Fujitsu F901iC
- Fujitsu F902i
- Fujitsu F902iS
- Helio Hero
- Mitsubishi D702i
- Mitsubishi D851iWM (MUSIC PORTER X)
- Mitsubishi D901i
- Mitsubishi D901iS
- Mitsubishi D902i
- Mitsubishi D902iS
- Motorola MS550
- Pantech PN-8300
- SK Teletech (SKY) IM-8300

Renesas SH-Mobile G1 — MBX Lite + VGP Lite + SH-X2(SH4AL-DSP)

- Fujitsu F704i
- Fujitsu Raku-Raku PHONE III (F882iES)
- Fujitsu Raku-Raku PHONE Basic (F883i)
- Fujitsu Raku-Raku PHONE IV (F883iES)
- Fujitsu F903i
- Fujitsu F903iX HIGH-SPEED
- Fujitsu F904i
- Mitsubishi D704i
- Mitsubishi D903i
- Mitsubishi D903iTV
- Mitsubishi D904i

Renesas SH-Mobile G2 — MBX Lite + VGP Lite + SH-X2(SH4AL-DSP)

- Fujitsu F905i
- Mitsubishi D905i
- Sharp SH905i
- Sony Ericsson SO905i
- Sony Ericsson SO905iCS
- Fujitsu F906i
- Fujitsu F706i
- Sharp SH906i
- Sharp SH906iTV
- Sharp SH706i
- Sharp SH706ie
- Sharp SH706iw
- Sony Ericsson SO906i
- Sony Ericsson SO706i

Renesas SH-Navi1 (SH7770) — MBX + VGP + FPU + SH-X(SH-4A), Renesas unidentified — MBX + SuperH

- Alpine Car Information Systems
- Clarion MAX960HD
- Clarion NAX963HD
- Clarion NAX970HD
- Clarion NAX973HD and MAX973HD
- Clarion MAX9700DT
- Clarion MAX9750DT
- Mitsubishi HDD Navi H9000
- Mitsubishi HDD Navi H9700
- Pioneer Carrozzeria HDD CyberNavi AVIC-VH009
- Pioneer Carrozzeria HDD CyberNavi AVIC-ZH900MD

Renesas SH-Navi2G (SH7775) — MBX + VGP + FPU + SH-X2(SH-4A)

Samsung S3C2460 — MBX Lite + FPU + ARM926

Samsung S5L8900 — MBX Lite + VGP Lite + FPU (VFP11) + ARM1176

- iPhone
- iPhone 3G
- iPod Touch
- iPod Touch 2nd gen
- iPod Nano 4th gen
- iPod Nano 5th gen

Samsung S5PC510 — MBX Lite + VGP Lite + FPU + A10 + POWER VR 540

- MEIZU M9

SiRF SiRFprima — MBX Lite + VGP Lite + MVED1 + FPU + ARM11

- Dmedia G400 WiMAX MID
- CMMB K704
- CMMB T700
- ACCO MID Q7
- ACCO P439
- FineDrive iQ500
- RMVB C7
- Vanhe T700
- WayteQ X610, X620, N800, N810, X810, X820
- YFI 80T-1

Sunplus unidentified — MBX

Texas Instruments OMAP 2420 — MBX + VGP + FPU (VFP11) + ARM1136

- Motorola MOTO Q 9h
- Motorola MOTO Q music 9m
- Motorola MOTO Q PRO
- Motorola MOTORIZR Z8
- Motorola MOTORIZR Z10
- NEC N902i
- NEC N902iS
- NEC N902iX HIGH-SPEED
- Nokia E90 Communicator
- Nokia N82
- Nokia N93
- Nokia N93i
- Nokia N95 (Classic, US, SoftBank X02NK Japanese, and 8 GB versions) ( N95 RM-159 / 245 = TI OMAP DM290Z WV C-68A0KYW EI )
- Nokia N800
- Nokia N810
- Nokia N810 Wimax edition
- Panasonic P702iD
- Panasonic P702iS
- Panasonic P902i
- Panasonic P902iS
- Sharp SH702iD
- Sharp SH702iS
- Sharp SH902i
- Sharp SH902iS
- Sharp DOLCE SL (SH902iSL)
- Sony Ericsson SO902i
- Sony Ericsson SO902iWP+

Texas Instruments OMAP2430 — MBX Lite + VGP Lite + FPU + ARM1136

- ASUS M536
- Fujitsu F1100
- NEC N903i
- NEC N904i
- NEC N905i
- NEC N905iμ
- Palm Treo 800w
- Panasonic P903i
- Panasonic P903iTV
- Panasonic P903iX HIGH-SPEED
- Samsung SGH-G810
- Samsung SGH-i550
- Samsung SGH-i560
- Samsung innov8 (SGH-i8510)
- Samsung GT-i7110
- Sharp SH704i
- Sharp SH903i
- Sharp SH904i
- Sony Ericsson SO704i
- Sony Ericsson SO903i

Texas Instruments OMAP2530 — MBX Lite + VGP Lite + FPU + ARM1176

- Thinkware iNAVI K2
- Digital Cube iStation T5
- APSI LM480

== PowerVR Video Cores (MVED/VXD) ==
Apple A4 — VXD375

- Apple iPad
- Apple iPhone 4
- Apple iPod Touch 4th Gen
- Apple TV Second Generation

Apple A5

- Apple iPad 2
- Apple iPad Mini
- Apple iPhone 4S
- Apple iPod Touch 5th Gen

Apple A5X

- Apple iPad 3

Apple A6

- Apple iPhone 5
- Apple iPhone 5C

Apple A6X

- Apple iPad 4

Marvell PXA310/312 — MVED

- Airis T483 / T482L
- Blackberry Bold 9700
- Geeks'Phone ONE
- General Mobile DSTL1
- Gigabyte GSmart MS808
- HP iPaq 11x/21x
- HKC Prado
- HKC Mopad 8/E
- HKC G920, G908
- i-MATE 810F (Hummer)
- Motorola FR68 and FR6000
- NIM1000
- NDrive S400
- Pharos 565
- Qigi AK007C, i6-Goal, i6-Win, i6C, U8/U8P
- RoverPC Pro G7, X7, evo V7
- Samsung i780, i900 Omnia, i907 Epix, i908 Omnia, i910 Omnia, SCH-M490 T*OMNIA, SCH-M495 T*OMNIA
- Samsung SPH-M4800 Ultra Messaging II
- SoftBank 930SC Omnia
- WayteQ X520, X-Phone

Samsung S5PC100 — VXD370

- Apple iPhone 3GS
- Apple iPod Touch 3rd Gen

Samsung Hummingbird S5PC110/SP5C111/S5PV210 — VXD370

- PanDigital SuperNova 8" tablet
- Samsung Galaxy S series (excluding i9003 and i9001)
- Samsung Droid Charge
- Samsung Exhibit 4G
- Samsung Galaxy Tab P1000 and all variants(excluding Galaxy Tab WiFi P1010)
- Samsung Galaxy S WiFi series
- Samsung Nexus S series
- T-Mobile Sidekick 4G

Samsung Exynos 5410

- Samsung Galaxy S4 (GT-I9500)
- Meizu MX3(M353)

SI Electronics unidentified — VXD380

Texas Instruments OMAP4430

- Amazon Kindle Fire
- Google Glass
- LG Optimus 3D
- LG Optimus L9
- LG Prada 3.0
- Motorola Atrix 2
- Motorola Droid RAZR
- Motorola Droid RAZR MAXX
- Samsung Galaxy S II (GT-I9100G)
- Samsung Galaxy Tab 2 7.0

Texas Instruments OMAP4460

- Amazon Kindle Fire HD
- Google Nexus Q
- Huawei Ascend D1
- Samsung Galaxy Nexus

== PowerVR Video/Display Cores(PDP) ==
NEC EMMA 3TL — PDP

- Sony Bravia TV's

== Series5 (SGX) ==
- PowerVR SGX (pixel, vertex, and geometry shader hardware)
  - next generation fully programmable universal scalable shader architecture
  - exceeding requirements of OpenGL 2.0 and up to DirectX 10.1 Shader Model 4.1
  - licensed to Allwinner Technology, Apple Inc, Sony, Ingenic Semiconductor, Intel, Nokia, Renesas, NEC, TI, MediaTek, NXP Semiconductors, Realtek, Rockchip Samsung, Sigma Designs, SigmaTel, SiRF, SiS and others
  - size from 2.6 mm² to 12.5 mm² (@65 nm)
  - 6 variants announced (realistic, sustainable, less than 50% shader load, real-world performance listed at 200 MHz; peak performance significantly higher dependent on content and operating conditions)
    - SGX520 (7 mil Triangles/sec, 250Mpx/s@200 MHz) for the handheld mobile market
    - SGX530 (14 mil Triangles/sec, 500Mpx/s@200 MHz)for the handheld mobile market
    - SGX535 (14 mil Triangles/s, 1Gpx/s@200 MHz, Max Memory Band 4.2GB/s), For handheld high-end mobile, portable, MID, UMPC, consumer, and automotive devices.licensed by NEC. Intel calls it the GMA 500.
    - SGX540 (20 mil Triangles/s(Built-in Samsung S5PC110-111) 1Gpx/s@200 MHz, Built-in SOC.
    - SGX545 (40 mil Triangles/s, 1Gpx/s@200 MHz)

Products that include the SGX:

Allwinner Technology A31 — SGX544MP2 + G2D + CedarX + 4 * Cortex A7

- Readboy G50
- GoClever Orion 70
- Foxconn InFocus
- Mele A1000G
- Onda V972
- Ployer MOMO19HD
- Bmorn K23
- Ampe A10 Flagship
- Epudo ES1006Q

Allwinner Technology A31s — SGX544MP2 + G2D + CedarX + 4 * Cortex A7

- iView CyberPad iView-788TPC
- Boardcon Compact31S
- MSI Primo81
- Teclast P88s mini
- Ainol Novo 9 Firewire
- Apical M7853,
- Ployer momo mini
- Gajah MD7019,
- JWD m785
- MELE AHD10A04

Ambarella iOne SoC — SGX540 + Cortex-A9 Dual

Apple A4 — SGX535 + VXD375 + Cortex-A8

- Apple iPad
- Apple iPhone 4
- Apple iPod Touch 4th gen
- Apple TV (2010)

Samsung — SGX540(S5PC110-111) + Cortex-A8

- Samsung Galaxy S
- Samsung Samsung Galaxy Tab
- Samsung [[Vibrant, i997 Infuse 4G, Galaxy S 4G, Nexus S, i897 Captivate, S8530 Wave II]]

Intel CE 3100 (Canmore) — SGX535 (Intel GMA 500) + Pentium M-based Dothan CPU at 800MHz+

Intel CE3100 Die Shot (Canmore)

- Conceptronic YUIXX
- Gigabyte GN-MD300-RH
- Metrological's Mediaconnect TV
- Routon H3
- Samsung STB-HDDVR
- Toshiba Connected TVs
- Toshiba Network Player
- TCL IPTV
- Fujitsu

Ingenic Semiconductor JZ4780 — SGX540 + XBurst (MIPS)

- Creator CI20

Intel CE4100 (Sodaville) family — SGX535 + Bonnell-based Atom CPU

- Orange Orange Box
- Sony Bravia Internet TV

Intel CE4110 (Sodaville) — SGX535 at 200MHz + Bonnell-based Atom CPU at 1.2GHz

- D-Link Boxee Box

Intel CE4130 (Sodaville) — SGX535 at 200MHz + Bonnell-based Atom CPU at 1.2GHz

Intel CE4150 (Sodaville) — SGX535 at 400MHz + Bonnell-based Atom CPU at 1.2GHz

- Logitech Revue (970-000001)
- Iliad Freebox Revolution

Intel CE4170 (Sodaville) — SGX535 at 400MHz + Bonnell-based Atom CPU at 1.6GHz

Intel CE4200 (Groveland) family — SGX535 + Bonnell-based Atom CPU

- Bouygues Telecom BBox

Intel SCH US15/W/L (Poulsbo) — SGX535 (Intel GMA 500) + VXD370

- Abit (USI) MID-100
- Abit (USI) MID-150, MID-200
- Acer Aspire One AO751h
- Advantech MICA-101
- Aigo MID P8860, P8880, P8888
- Arbor Gladius G0710
- Archos 9
- ASUS EeePC T91
- ASUS EeePC S121, EeePC 1101HGO/HA/HAB
- ASUS R50A, R70A
- Averatec (TriGem) MID
- BenQ Aries2
- Bandai Namco Rilakkuma
- BenQ S6
- Clarion MiND
- CLEVO TN70M, TN71M, T89xM
- Colmek Stinger
- Compal jAX10
- CompuLab Fit-PC2
- Cowon W2
- Dell Inspiron Mini 12, Inspiron Mini 10, Inspiron Mini 1010 Tiger
- Digifriends WiMAX MID
- DT Research DT312
- DUX HFBX-3800
- EB mobile internet device
- FMV-BIBLO LOOX U/C40, LOOX U/C30
- Fujitsu UMPC U2010
- Fujitsu LifeBook U2020
- Fujitsu LifeBook U820, UH900
- Fujitsu FMV-BIBLO LOOX U
- Fujitsu STYLISTIC Q550
- Gigabyte M528
- Hanbit Pepper Pad 3
- HP Slate
- Kohjinsha/Inventec S32, SC3
- Kohjinsha W130, SX3KP06MS, SC3KX06A
- Kohjinsha/Inventec X5
- Kohjinsha PM series
- Lenovo IdeaPad U8
- LG XNote B831, LGX30
- MaxID BHC-100, iDLMax
- mis MP084T-001G
- MSI Wind U115, U110
- MSI X-Slim 320
- NEC VersaPro UltraLite type VS
- NEXCOM MRC 2100, MTC 2100, MTC 2100-MD
- Nokia Booklet 3G
- NOVA SideArm2 SA2I
- OMRON Panel PC
- Onkyo NX707
- OQO Model 2+
- Panasonic Toughbook CF-U1
- Panasonic CF-H1 Mobile Clinical Assistant
- Portwell Japan UMPC-2711
- Quanta mobile internet device
- Sony Vaio P series, Vaio X series
- TCS-003-01595 — Intel Atom Rugged Tablet PC 8.4"
- Terralogic Toughnote DB06-I Intel Atom Industrial Grade Rugged UMPC
- Terralogic Toughnote DB06-M Intel Atom Military Grade Rugged UMPC
- Toshiba mobile internet device
- Trigem LLUON Mobbit PS400
- UMID Clamshell
- Yukyung Viliv S5, Viliv S7, Viliv X70, Viliv N5
- WiBrain i1, M1
- WILLCOM D4 (Sharp WS016SH)

Intel Z6xx (Lincroft) — SGX535+VXD+VXE (Intel GMA 600) + Bonnell-based Atom CPU

- LG GW990 (Concept device)
- OpenPeak OpenTablet 7
- Aava Mobile (Concept device)
- Wistron W1
- Quanta Redvale
- CZC P10T

Intel CE5315 (Berryville) — SGX545 + Saltwell-based Atom CPU at 1.2GHz

- Asustor AS-204T (NAS)
- Thecus N2520 (NAS)
- Thecus N4520 (NAS)

Intel CE5335 (Berryville) — SGX545 + Saltwell-based Atom CPU at 1.6GHz

- Synology DS214play (NAS)
- Synology DS414play (NAS)

NEC EMMA Mobile/EV2 — SGX530 + Cortex-A9 MPCore (Dual)

NEC NaviEngine EC-4270, EC-4260 — SGX535 + ARM11 MPCore (Quad)

- Alpine Car Information Systems (Spring 2010)

NEC Unidentified — SGX + PowerVR video & display

NEC Medity M2 — SGX + PowerVR video & display

- NEC N-01A, N-02A, N-03A, N-04A, N-05A, N-06A, NEC N-07A, NEC N-08A, N-09A

Renesas SH-Mobile G3 — SGX530 + SH-4

- Fujitsu F-01A, F-02A, F-03A, F-04A, F-08A, F-09A
- Sharp SH-01A, SH-02A, SH-03A, SH-05A, SH-06A, SH-07A, SH-06A NERV

Renesas SH-Mobile G4 (in development) — SGX540 + SH-4

- Fujitsu (in development)
- Sharp (in development)

Renesas SH-Mobile APE4 (R8A73720) — SGX540 + Cortex-A8

Renesas SH-Navi3 (SH7776) — SGX530 + SH-X3(SH-4A (Dual))

Samsung APL0298C05 — SGX535 + VXD370 + Cortex-A8

- Apple iPod Touch 3rd Gen (32GB/64GB)
- Apple iPhone 3GS

Samsung S5PC110 — SGX540 + Cortex-A8

- Meizu M9

Samsung S5PC111 (Hummingbird) — SGX540 + Cortex-A8

- Samsung Vibrant
- Samsung Epic 4G
- Samsung Fascinate
- Samsung Captivate
- Samsung Galaxy S
- Samsung P1000/P1000T Galaxy Tab
- Samsung Yepp PMP
- Nexus S

Samsung S5PV210 — SGX540 + Cortex-A8

- Embest DevKit7000
- Boardcon EM210

Sigma Designs SMP8656 — SGX530 + MIPS

Sigma Designs SMP8910 - SGX530 + MIPS

Texas Instruments OMAP3420 — SGX530 + Cortex-A8

Texas Instruments OMAP3430 — SGX530 + Cortex-A8

- Nokia N900
- Emblaze ELSE
- Palm Pre
- Palm Pre Plus
- Samsung i8910, i8320
- Samsung (Vodafone) 360 H1, 360 M1
- Sony Ericsson Satio
- Motorola Droid / Milestone
- Motorola MOTOROI
- Motorola XT800
- HTC Qilin/Dopod T8388

Texas Instruments OMAP3440 — SGX530 + Cortex-A8

- ARCHOS Android IMT
- ECS T800 800 MHz
- Motorola Milestone XT720

Texas Instruments OMAP3450 — SGX530 + Cortex-A8

- ECS T800 1 GHz

Texas Instruments OMAP3515 — SGX530 + Cortex-A8

Texas Instruments AM3517 — SGX530 + Cortex-A8

- Embest SOC8200
- DAVE Embedded Systems Lizard (SOM)

Texas Instruments OMAP3530 — SGX530 + Cortex-A8

- Embest DevKit8000
- Embest SBC8100
- Embest VSS3530
- OpenSourceMID.org K7 MID
- Always Innovating Touch Book
- Beagle Board
- Beagle MID
- Gumstix Overo — Water, Fire
- ICETEK-OMAP3530-MINI
- Pandora (console)
- OMAP35x EVM Mistral Solutions
- ISB Corp. Android STB
- Kopin Golden-i
- GDA Technologies' OMAP3530-based PMP

Texas Instruments OMAP3620 — SGX530 + Cortex-A8

- Motorola Droid 2

Texas Instruments OMAP3621 — SGX530 + Cortex-A8

- Barnes & Noble Nook Color

Texas Instruments OMAP3630 — SGX530 + Cortex-A8

- Archos 28, Archos 32, Archos 43, Archos 70, Archos 101
- Synaptics Fuse
- Sony Ericsson U5i "Vivaz", Sony Ericsson U8i "Vivaz pro"
- Motorola Droid X (Shadow)
- Motorola Milestone 2
- Nokia N9
- Palm Pre2
- LG Optimus Black
- Samsung Galaxy SL
- Samsung P1010 Galaxy Tab Wi-Fi

Texas Instruments OMAP3640 — SGX530 + Cortex-A8

- Motorola Droid 2 R2D2 special edition
- Motorola Droid 2 Global

Texas Instruments Sitara AM3715 — SGX530 + Cortex-A8

- Psion Omnii EP10
- Embest DevKit8500A

Texas Instruments DaVinci DM3730 — SGX530 + Cortex-A8

- InHand Fury
- Beagleboard-xM
- Embest DevKit8500D

Texas Instruments Sitara AM3891 — SGX530 + Cortex-A8

Texas Instruments Integra C6A8168 — SGX530 + Cortex-A8

Texas Instruments OMAP4430 — SGX540 + Cortex-A9 MPCore (dual)

- Kindle Fire
- Barnes & Noble Nook Tablet
- Droid Bionic
- Pandaboard
- RIM Playbook

Texas Instruments OMAP4460 — SGX540 + Cortex-A9 MPCore (dual)

- Galaxy Nexus
- Kindle Fire HD 7"

Texas Instruments OMAP4470 — SGX544 + Cortex-A9 MPCore (dual)

- Kindle Fire HD 8.9"
- Archos 101 G10
- Kobo arch (Zeus)
- Samsung GT-I9105

Trident PNX8481 — SGX531

Trident PNX8491 — SGX531

Trident HiDTV PRO-SX5 — SGX531

== Series5XT (SGX) ==
- PowerVR SGXMP variants available as single and multi-core IP 543XT, 544XT, and 554XT series
  - Performance scales 95% linearly with number of cores and clock speed
- Available in single to 16 core variants
  - SGX543
    - (single core) 35M polygon/s @200 MHz
    - (two cores) 68M polygon/s @200 MHz
    - (four cores) 133M polygon/s @200 MHz
    - (eight cores) 266M polygon/s @200 MHz
    - (sixteen cores) 532M polygon/s @200 MHz
- Licensees:
  - Sony
  - Renesas
  - Texas Instruments
  - Apple
  - Intel
  - Samsung
  - MStar
  - MediaTek
  - Allwinner

PlayStation Vita

- SGX543MP4+ (four cores) @200 MHz

Renesas G5/AG5/APE5R

- SGX543MP2 (two cores)

Texas Instruments OMAP5430 & OMAP5432

- SGX544MP2 (two cores) @532 MHz

Apple A5 - SGX543MP2 (two cores)

- Apple iPad 2 (MP2@250 MHz)
- Apple iPad Mini (MP2@250 MHz)
- Apple iPhone 4S (MP2@200 MHz)
- Apple iPod Touch (5th generation)(MP2@200 MHz)
- Apple TV (3rd generation) (MP2@250 MHz)

Apple A5X - SGX543MP4 (four cores) @250 MHz

- Apple iPad (3rd generation)

Apple A6 - SGX543MP3 (three cores) @325 MHz

- Apple iPhone 5

Apple A6X - SGX554MP4 (four cores) @280 MHz

- Apple iPad (4th generation)

Allwinner Allwinner A31 - SGX544MP2 (two cores) @355 MHz

- Iben L1 Gaming Tablet

Allwinner Allwinner A31s - SGX544MP2 (two cores) @355 MHz

- JXD S7800a

Samsung Exynos 5 Octa - SGX544MP3 (three cores) @533 MHz

- Samsung Galaxy S4 (GT-I9500)

== Series6 ==
- Code name: Rogue
- PowerVR Series6 GPUs can deliver 20x or more of the performance of current generation GPU cores targeting comparable markets. This is enabled by an architecture that is around 5x more efficient than previous generations.
- Supported Graphics API's
  - Vulkan, OpenGL ES 3.1, OpenGL ES 2.0, OpenGL 3.x/4.x, OpenCL 1.x and DirectX10 with certain family members extending their capabilities to full WHQL-compliant DirectX11.2 functionality.
- Licensees
  - Apple
  - Allwinner
  - ST-Ericsson (defunct)
  - Texas Instruments
  - Renesas Electronics
  - MediaTek
  - HiSilicon
  - LG
  - Intel

Allwinner UltraOcta A80

Quad-core ARM Cortex-A15 and quad-core ARM Cortex-A7 (ARM big.LITTLE), PowerVR G6230, 4K video encoding and decoding.

- Optimus Board
- PCDuino 8
- Cubieboard 8

ST-Ericsson

- Nova A9600, built in 28 nm, 210 GFLOPs, 350 M polygons/s, fill rates in excess of 13 Gpixels/sec, sampling in 2013 (cancelled).

Apple A7

- iPhone 5s, iPad Air, iPad Mini (2nd generation), iPad Mini (3rd generation) - PowerVR G6430 in a four cluster configuration

Apple A8

- iPhone 6, iPhone 6 Plus - PowerVR Series 6XT GX6450@533 MHz (4 clusters)

Apple A8X

- iPad Air 2 - 2* GX6450@533 MHz (mirrored - 8 clusters)

Actions-Semi ActDuino S900

Quad-core ARM Cortex-A53, PowerVR G6230, 4K video decoding.

- Bubblegum-96

== Series6XT ==
MediaTek MT8173

Dual-core ARM Cortex-A72 and dual-core ARM Cortex-A53 (ARM big.LITTLE), PowerVR GX6250, 4K H.264/HEVC(10-bit)/VP9 video decoding, WQXGA display support

Renesas R-Car H3

Quad-core ARM Cortex-A57 and quad-core ARM Cortex-A53 (ARM big.LITTLE), ARM Cortex-R7 dual-step, PowerVR GX6650

== Series6XE ==
Rockchip RK3368

Octa-core ARM Cortex-A53, PowerVR G6110, 4K H.264/H.265 video decoding
