= Apple A8X =

System-on-a-chip designed by Apple Inc.

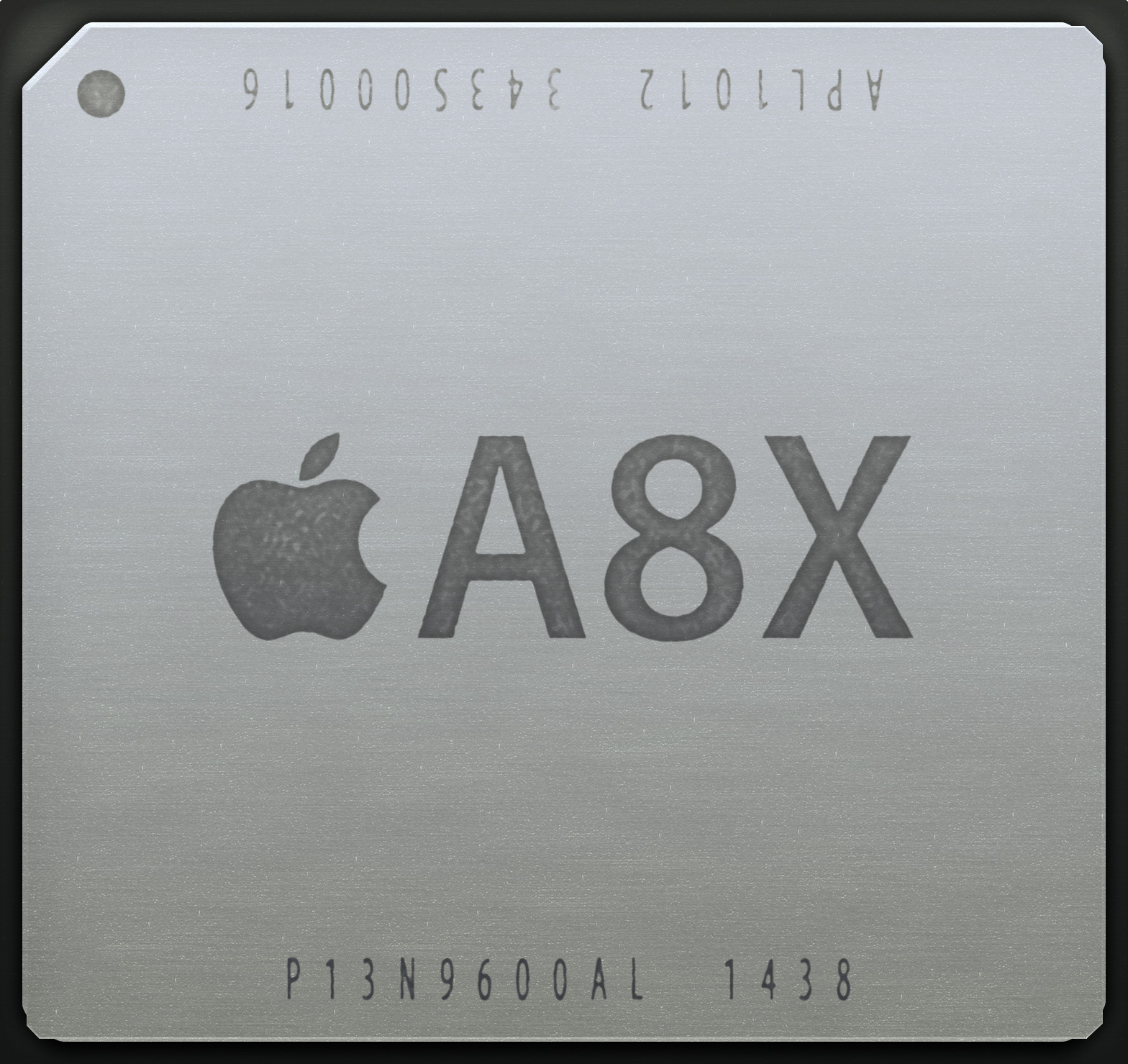
- Apple A8X chip

General information
- Launched: October 16, 2014
- Discontinued: March 21, 2017
- Designed by: Apple Inc.
- Common manufacturer: TSMC
- Product code: APL1012

Performance
- Max. CPU clock rate: 1.5 GHz

Physical specifications
- Cores: 3
- GPU: PowerVR Series6XT GXA6850 (8 cores)

Cache
- L1 cache: Per core: 64 KB instruction + 64 KB data
- L2 cache: 2 MB shared
- L3 cache: 4 MB

Architecture and classification
- Application: Mobile
- Technology node: 20 nm
- Microarchitecture: Typhoon
- Instruction set: ARMv8-A: A64, A32, T32

Products, models, variants
- Variant: Apple A8

History
- Predecessor: Apple A7 (APL5698 variant)
- Successors: Apple A9 (iPad 5); Apple A9X (iPad Pro)

The Apple A8X is a 64-bit ARM-based system on a chip (SoC) designed by Apple Inc., part of the Apple silicon series, and manufactured by TSMC. It was introduced with and only used in the iPad Air 2, which was announced on October 16, 2014. It is a variant of the A8 inside the iPhone 6 family of smartphones and Apple states that it has 40% more CPU performance and 2.5 times the graphics performance of its predecessor, the Apple A7.

The latest software update for the iPad Air 2 using this chip is iPadOS 15.8.8 (updated on May 11, 2026), as the hardware limitations of the A8X meant it could not update with the release of iPadOS 16 in 2022.

== Design ==
The A8X has three cores clocked at 1.5 GHz, a more powerful GPU compared to the A8 and it contains 3 billion transistors. With an extra 100 MHz and an additional core, the A8X performs around 13% better on single threaded and 55% better on multithreaded operations than the A8 inside the iPhone 6 and iPhone 6 Plus.

Further comparison to the A8 shows that the A8X uses a metal heat spreader, which the A8 does not, and it doesn't use the package on package configuration with included RAM which the A8 does. This is similar to how the older "X" variants, the A5X and A6X, were designed. Instead the A8X in the iPad Air 2 uses an external 2 GB RAM module.

In a first for Apple, the A8X is reported to have a semi-custom GPU. The A8X uses an 8-cluster GPU based on Imagination Technologies PowerVR Series 6XT architecture. Officially, the largest implementation of Rogue is a 6-cluster design, indicating that Apple has made customizations to the design in order to provide higher performance. This GPU is referred to as the GXA6850, with the "A" denoting the Apple customization.

The A8X has video codec encoding support for H.264. It has decoding support for H.264, MPEG‑4, and Motion JPEG.

== Patent litigation ==
The A8X's branch predictor has been claimed to infringe on a 1998 patent. On October 14, 2015, a district judge found Apple guilty of infringing U.S. patent US 5781752, "Table based data speculation circuit for parallel processing computer", on the Apple A7 and A8 processors. The patent is owned by Wisconsin Alumni Research Foundation (WARF), a firm affiliated with the University of Wisconsin. On July 24, 2017, Apple was ordered to pay WARF $506 million for patent infringement. Apple filed an appellate brief on October 26, 2017, with the U.S. Court of Appeals for the Federal Circuit, that argued that Apple did not infringe on the patent owned by the Wisconsin Alumni Research Foundation. On September 28, 2018, the ruling was overturned on appeal and the award thrown out by the U.S. Federal Circuit Court of Appeals. The patent expired in December 2016.

== Products that include the Apple A8X ==
- iPad Air 2
- iPad Pro (J98 & J99, never sold)

== See also ==
- Apple silicon, the range of ARM-based processors designed by Apple.
- Comparison of ARMv8-A cores
