= IPhone 5c =

Smartphone developed by Apple (2013–2016)

iPhone 5c

- iPhone 5c in Blue
- Developer: Apple
- Type: Smartphone
- First released: September 20, 2013; 13 years ago
- Availability by region: 2013–2015
- Discontinued: 16 and 32 GB: September 9, 2014; 12 years ago 8 GB: September 9, 2015; 11 years ago (except India); February 17, 2016; 10 years ago (India)
- Predecessor: iPhone 5
- Successor: iPhone SE (1st generation)
- Related: iPhone 5s
- Compatible networks: GSM, CDMA, 3G, EVDO, HSPA+, EDGE, LTE
- Form factor: Slate
- Dimensions: 124.4 mm (4.90 in) H 59.2 mm (2.33 in) W 8.97 mm (0.353 in) D
- Weight: 132 g (4.66 oz)
- Operating system: Original: iOS 7.0; Last: iOS 10.3.3, released July 19, 2017
- System-on-chip: Apple A6
- Memory: 1 GB LPDDR2-1066 RAM
- Storage: 8, 16 and 32 GB
- Removable storage: None
- SIM: nanoSIM
- Battery: 5.73 Whr (1510 mAh) Lithium-ion battery
- Charging: 5W
- Rear camera: Sony Exmor R IMX145; 8 MP back-side illuminated sensor HD video (1080p) at 30 frame/s IR filter Aperture f/2.4 5 element lens face detection (stills only); Image stabilization
- Front camera: 1.2 MP, HD video (720p)
- Display: 4 inches (100 mm) (16:9 aspect ratio), multi-touch display, LED backlit IPS TFT LCD, 640×1136 pixels at 326 ppi, 800:1 contrast ratio (typical), 500 cd/m^{2} max. brightness (typical), Fingerprint-resistant oleophobic coating on front
- Sound: Single loudspeaker 3.5 mm TRRS, 20 Hz to 20 kHz frequency response (internal, headset); 3.5 mm audio jack
- Connectivity: Wi-Fi, Bluetooth 5, Lightning connector
- Data inputs: Multi-touch touchscreen display Triple microphone configuration 3-axis gyroscope 3-axis accelerometer Digital compass Proximity sensor Ambient light sensor (GPS GLONASS)
- Made in: China
- Website: Apple – iPhone 5c at the Wayback Machine (archived January 31, 2014)

The iPhone 5c is a smartphone that was developed and marketed by Apple. It is part of the sixth generation of the iPhone. The device was unveiled on September 10, 2013, and released on September 20, 2013, along with its higher-end counterpart, the iPhone 5s. The "c" in the iPhone 5c's name stands for "color".

The iPhone 5c is a variant of the iPhone 5, with similar hardware specifications but a hard-coated polycarbonate shell instead of the aluminum of the original iPhone 5. The iPhone 5c was available in several color options and shipped with iOS 7. The device was released at a lower price point than the new flagship 5s; unlike Apple's usual practice of lowering the price of the previous model upon release of a new version, the iPhone 5 was explicitly discontinued and replaced by the 5c. On September 9, 2014, the 16 and 32 GB iPhone 5c models were replaced by the 8 GB model upon the announcement of the iPhone 6 and 6 Plus. On September 9, 2015, the 8 GB version was discontinued in all markets except for India, where it continued to be available until February 17, 2016.

The iPhone 5c was the last new iPhone to be sold at a lower price than the flagship iPhone until the release of the first-generation iPhone SE in 2016. The iPhone XR released in 2018 was considered a spiritual successor to the 5c by some observers, but the XR shared similar internal hardware with its more expensive counterparts.

== Features ==
=== Design ===
The iPhone 5c was redesigned using polycarbonate housing, which is strengthened by a steel band. However, due to the material of design changes, the phone weighs 132 grams, which is 20 grams heavier than both the 5 and the 5s, but still lighter than older iPhone models. The design of the iPhone 5c is also considerably thicker but closely similar to the design of the iPod Touch (5th generation) models, which is also available in a variety of colors but is constructed with different materials. Other minor changes include a different camera assembly and the design of the mute/ringer switch. This iPhone received positive reviews for its design claiming that it was the most durable iPhone ever. The iPhone 5c was offered in several colors.

Color	Name	Front
	White	Black
	Blue	Black
	Green	Black
	Yellow	Black
	Pink	Black

=== Software ===
The iPhone 5c features iOS, Apple's mobile operating system. The user interface of iOS is based on the concept of direct manipulation using multi-touch gestures. Interlock control elements consist of sliders, switches, and buttons. Interaction with the OS includes gestures such as swipe, tap, pinch, and reverse pinch, all of which have specific definitions within the context of the iOS operating system and its multi-touch interface. Internal accelerometers are used by some applications to respond to shaking the device (one common result is the undo command) or rotating it vertically (one common result is switching from portrait to landscape mode).

The iPhone 5c was supplied with iOS 7, released on September 20, 2013. Jony Ive, the designer of iOS 7's new elements, described the update as "bringing order to complexity", highlighting features such as refined typography, new icons, translucency, layering, physics, and gyroscope-driven parallaxing as some of the major changes to the design. The design of both iOS 7 and OS X Yosemite (version 10.10) noticeably depart from skeuomorphic elements such as green felt in Game Center, wood in Newsstand, and leather in Calendar, in favor of flatter graphic design.

The phone can act as a hotspot, sharing its Internet connection over Wi-Fi, Bluetooth, or USB, and also accesses the App Store, an online application distribution platform for iOS developed and maintained by Apple. The service allows users to browse and download applications from the iTunes Store that were developed with Xcode and the iOS SDK and were published through Apple.

iOS 7 adds AirDrop, an ad-hoc Wi-Fi sharing platform. Users can share files with an iPhone 5 onwards, the iPod Touch (5th generation), iPad (4th generation), or iPad Mini. The operating system also adds Control Center, which gives iOS users access to commonly used controls and apps. By swiping up from any screen–including the Lock screen–users can do such things as switch to Airplane mode, turn Wi-Fi on or off, adjust the display brightness and similar basic functions of the device. It also includes a new integrated flashlight function to operate the reverse camera's flash LED as a flashlight.

The iPhone 5c functions as a media player, and includes Apple Maps and Passbook. The mapping application includes turn-by-turn navigation spoken directions, 3D views in some major cities and real-time traffic. Users can rotate their device horizontally to landscape mode to access a collage of album covers.

The 5c includes Siri, an intelligent personal assistant and knowledge navigator. The application uses a natural language user interface to answer questions, make recommendations, and perform actions by delegating requests to a set of Web services. Apple claims that the software adapts to the user's individual preferences over time and personalizes results. iOS 7 adds new male and female voices, new system setting functionalities, a redesign to match the rest of the operating system, and integration with Twitter, Wikipedia, Bing, and Photos. The last version of iOS it supports is iOS 10 in 2016. (The latest version is 10.3.3; the update to 10.3.4 is not necessary because the GPS problem does not occur on the 5c.) iOS 11 drops support for the iPhone 5c, as the phone ceased production in September 2015, and it is also a 32-bit iPhone.

Facebook comes integrated through Apple's native apps. Facebook features can be directly accessed from within native apps such as Calendar which can sync Facebook events, or use Facebook's like button from within the Apple App Store. iTunes Radio, an internet radio service, is also included on the iPhone 5c. It is a free, ad-supported service available to all iTunes users, featuring Siri integration on iOS. Users are able to skip tracks, customize stations, and purchase the station's songs from the iTunes Store. Users can also search through their history of previous songs.

=== Hardware ===
The iPhone 5c uses most of the same hardware as the iPhone 5, with some minor changes.

Compared to the iPhone 5's aluminum body, the 5c is made up of a unibody hard-coated polycarbonate body with a steel-reinforced frame, which also acts as an antenna. The iPhone 5c is available in multiple bright colors for the back — blue, green, pink, yellow, and white, with a black glass front.

The iPhone 5c uses a system on chip (SoC), called the Apple A6, the same chip that powered the iPhone 5. The SoC comprises a 1.3 GHz dual-core processor, 1 GB of RAM and a tri-core PowerVR SGX543MP3 running at 266 MHz.

The iPhone 5c has new LTE antennas that now cover more LTE bands than any other smartphone according to Apple.

The 5c features a 4-inch Retina, multi-touch display, which has a 640×1136 pixel resolution. Storage capacities available are fixed at 8, 16, or 32 GB; plug-in memory card are not supported. The iPhone 5c uses a Nano SIM card, same as the iPhone 5s and the iPhone 5.

The rechargeable lithium-ion battery with a charge capacity of 1510mAh is slightly improved upon iPhone 5's 1440mAh battery. It is rated at ≤225 hours of standby time and ≤8 hours of talk time. It is integrated and cannot be replaced by the user.

The iPhone 5c retains the 8 MP back camera similar to the iPhone 5 but with a different camera assembly. The front camera, which is accessible through the FaceTime and camera apps, has a lower resolution at 1.2 megapixels.

The iPhone 5c lacks the major new features introduced in the iPhone 5s. It does not have the iPhone 5s's Touch ID fingerprint scanner. It also does not have the 64-bit A7 SoC with the M7 motion co-processor. However, the iPhone 5c does support snapping still photos while video recording and 3x digital zooming.

The iPhone 5c was the last iPhone that has a 32-bit processor and one of the last iOS devices to have a 32-bit processor, along with the iPad (4th generation), which has a A6X chip.

== Apple accessories ==
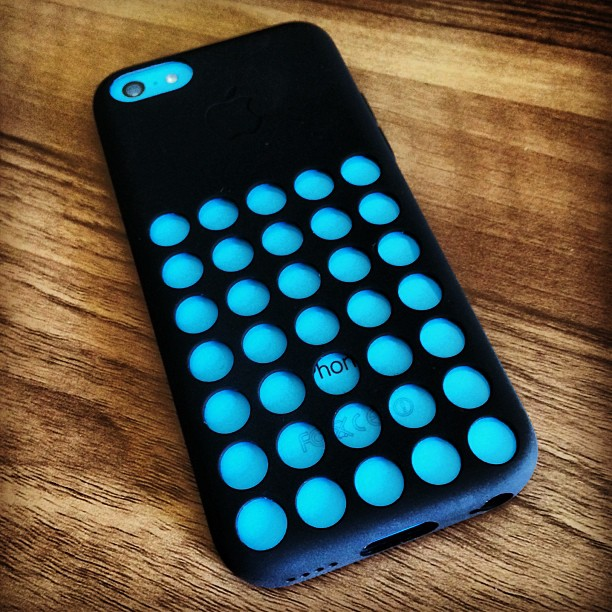
A blue iPhone 5c in the Apple-produced black case

During the iPhone's media event, Apple announced a case for the iPhone 5c that is available in six colors: black, white, pink, yellow, blue and green. Holes are cut out of the case to show the color of the iPhone's housing through the case, making for an almost two-tone looking device (although this resulted in the "iPhone" inscription on the back to appear as "hon".) The cases and phone colors make for thirty different color combinations. The inside of the case is lined with soft microfiber, with the outside being made of silicone. This is the first time Apple released a case for an iPhone since the iPhone 4 with the iPhone 4 Bumpers.

Apple also released a previously announced dock for the iPhone 5c, the first time Apple has made a dock since the iPhone 4. The dock has received overwhelmingly negative reviews on Apple's online store due to its incompatibility with phone cases.

== Reception ==
=== Critical reception ===
The iPhone 5c received mixed reviews, with praise for the phone itself, but criticism of the polycarbonate shell for lacking a 'premium' look and feel compared to the aluminum bodies of the iPhone 5 and iPhone 5s.

Most reviewers generally noted that the iPhone 5s offered more features (thanks to its 64-bit A7 SoC with the M7 motion co-processor) and storage space for a relatively small additional upfront cost (US$650 versus US$550 in March 2014) over the iPhone 5c, during the period that both phones were sold side by side. The 8 GB version of the iPhone 5c, released in 2014, was described as "unusable" as only 4.9GB was available to the user after installing iOS 8; in contrast to the iPhone 5s which offers a minimum of 16 GB of internal storage. The iPhone 5c was regarded as too expensive to compete with affordable flagship smartphones such as the Nexus 5 and OnePlus One, or smartphones designed for developing markets such as the Moto G.

=== Commercial reception ===
The iPhone 5s and 5c sold over nine million units in the first three days, which set a record for first weekend smartphone sales, with the 5s selling three times more units than iPhone 5c. After the first day of release, 1% of all iPhone in the US were iPhone 5s, while 0.3% were iPhone 5c.

Commentators viewed iPhone 5c as a flop because of supply chain cuts signifying a decline in demand in October 2013. Apple CEO Tim Cook admitted that the company overstocked the iPhone 5c while having shortages of the iPhone 5s, as a result of failing to anticipate the sales ratio between both phones. Six months after the release of the iPhone 5c, on March 25, 2014, Apple announced that sales of the iPhone line had crossed 500 million units, but did not break out how many of these units were the iPhone 5c. The iPhone 5c was among the top three best selling phones in the US for three months after its launch.

== See also ==
- List of iPhone models
- History of iPhone
- Timeline of iPhone models

Preceded by iPhone 5	iPhone; 7th generation alongside iPhone 5s	Succeeded by iPhone 6s / 6s Plus
