= Apple A7 =

System-on-a-chip designed by Apple Inc.

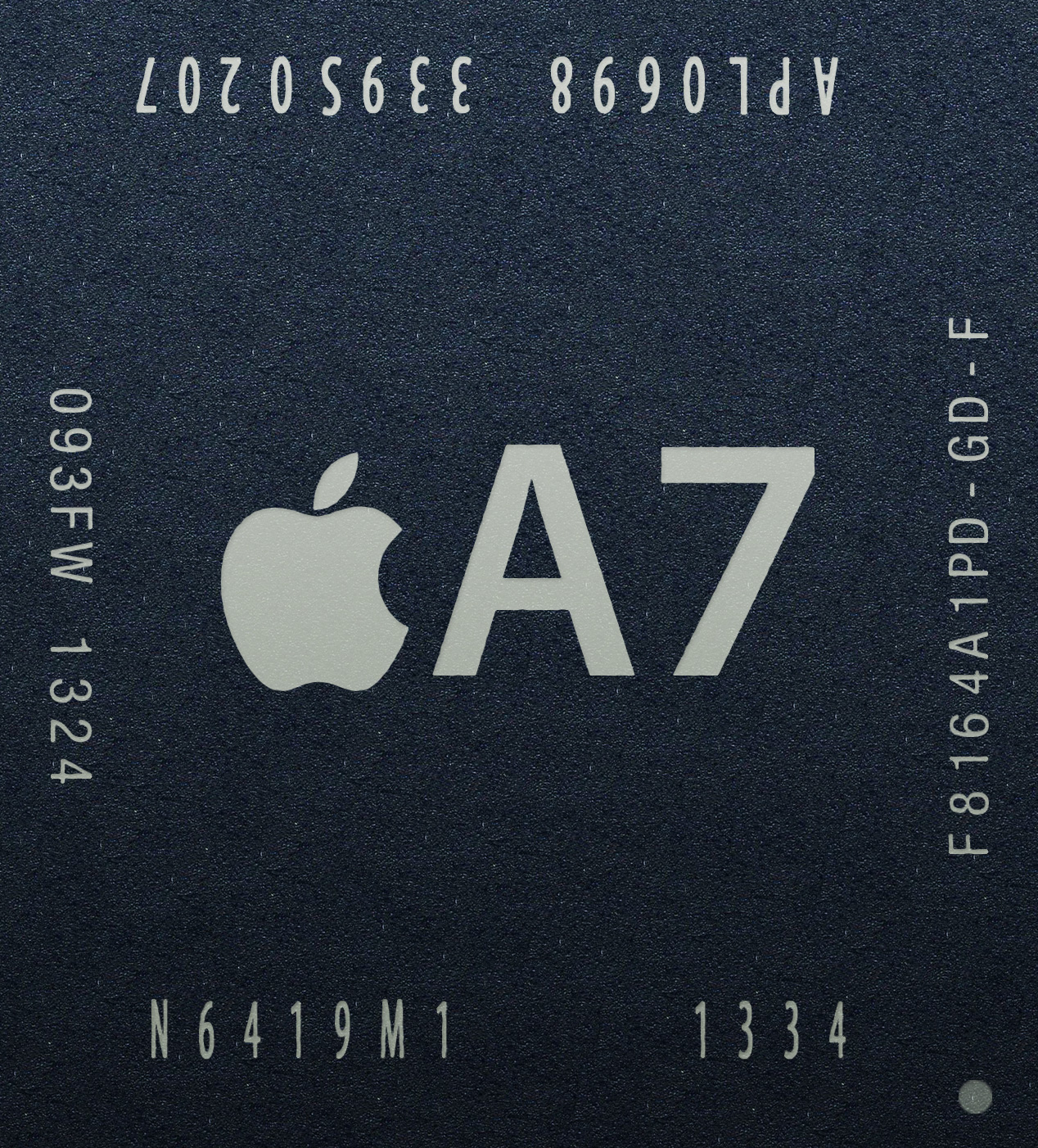
- The A7 processor

General information
- Launched: September 20, 2013 (APL0698); November 1, 2013 (APL5698)
- Discontinued: March 21, 2016 (APL5698); March 21, 2017 (APL0698)
- Designed by: Apple Inc.
- Common manufacturer: Samsung
- Product code: S5L8960X

Performance
- Max. CPU clock rate: 1.3 GHz to 1.4 GHz

Physical specifications
- Cores: 2
- GPU: PowerVR G6430 (quad-core)

Cache
- L1 cache: Per core: 64 KB instruction + 64 KB data
- L2 cache: 1 MB shared
- L3 cache: 4 MB

Architecture and classification
- Application: Mobile
- Technology node: 28 nm
- Microarchitecture: Cyclone
- Instruction set: ARMv8-A: A64, A32, T32

History
- Predecessors: Apple A6 (iPhone); Apple A6X (iPad)
- Successors: Apple A8 (iPhone); Apple A8X (iPad)

The Apple A7 is a 64-bit system on a chip (SoC) designed by Apple Inc., part of the Apple silicon series. It first appeared in the iPhone 5S, which was announced on September 10, 2013, and the iPad Air and iPad Mini 2, which were both announced on October 22, 2013. Apple states that it is up to twice as fast and has up to twice the graphics power compared to its predecessor, the Apple A6. It is the first 64-bit SoC to ship in a consumer smartphone or tablet computer. Production of A7 chips ended on March 21, 2017, following the discontinuation of the iPad mini 2, the last device to carry the A7. The latest software update for systems using this chip was iOS 12.5.8, released on January 26, 2026, as they were discontinued with the release of iOS 13 and iPadOS 13 in 2019.

== Design ==
The A7 features an Apple-designed 64-bit 1.3–1.4 GHz ARMv8-A dual-core CPU, called Cyclone. The 64-bit A64 instruction set in the ARMv8-A architecture doubles the number of registers of the A7 compared to the ARMv7 architecture used in A6. It has 31 general purpose registers that are each 64-bits wide and 32 floating-point/NEON registers that are each 128-bits wide.

The A7 also integrates a graphics processing unit (GPU) which AnandTech believes to be a PowerVR G6430 in a four cluster configuration.

The A7 has a per-core L1 cache of 64 KB for data and 64 KB for instructions, a L2 cache of 1 MB shared by both CPU cores, and a 4 MB L3 cache that services the entire SoC.

The A7 includes a new image processor, a feature originally introduced in the A5, used for functionality related to the camera such as image stabilizing, color correction, and light balance. The A7 also includes an area called the "Secure Enclave" that stores and protects the data from the Touch ID fingerprint sensor on the iPhone 5S and iPad mini 3. It has been speculated that the security of the data in the Secure Enclave is enforced by ARM's TrustZone/SecurCore technology. In a change from the Apple A6, the A7 SoC no longer services the accelerometer, gyroscope and compass. In order to reduce power consumption, this functionality has been moved to the new M7 motion coprocessor which appears to be a separate ARM-based microcontroller from NXP Semiconductors.

=== Apple A7 (APL0698) ===
Apple uses the APL0698 variant of the A7 chip, running at 1.3 GHz, in the iPhone 5S, iPad Mini 2, and iPad Mini 3. This A7 is manufactured by Samsung on a high-κ metal gate (HKMG) 28 nm process and the chip includes over 1 billion transistors on a die 102 mm^{2} in size. According to ABI Research the A7 drew 1100 mA during fixed point operations and 520 mA during floating point operations, while its predecessor, the A6 processor in the iPhone 5, drew 485 mA and 320 mA. It is manufactured in a package on package (PoP) together with 1 GB of LPDDR3 DRAM with a 64-bit wide memory interface onto the package.

=== Apple A7 (APL5698) ===
Apple uses the APL5698 variant of the A7 chip, running at 1.4 GHz, in the iPad Air. Its die is identical in size and layout to that of the first A7 and is manufactured by Samsung. However, unlike the first version of the A7, the A7 used in the iPad Air is not on a PoP, having no stacked RAM. Instead it uses a chip-on-board mounting, immediately adjacent DRAM, and is covered by a metallic heat spreader, similar to the Apple A5X and A6X.

== Patent litigation ==
The A7's branch predictor was claimed to infringe on a 1998 patent. On October 14, 2015, a district judge found Apple guilty of infringing U.S. patent US 5781752, "Table based data speculation circuit for parallel processing computer", on the Apple A7 and A8 processors. The patent is owned by Wisconsin Alumni Research Foundation (WARF), a firm affiliated with the University of Wisconsin. On July 24, 2017, Apple was ordered to pay WARF $506 million for patent infringement. Apple filed an appellate brief on October 26, 2017, with the U.S. Court of Appeals for the Federal Circuit, that argued that Apple did not infringe on the patent owned by the Wisconsin Alumni Research Foundation. On September 28, 2018, the ruling was overturned on appeal and the award thrown out by the U.S. Federal Circuit Court of Appeals. The patent expired in December 2016.

== Products that include the Apple A7 ==
- iPhone 5S
- iPad Air (1st generation)
- iPad Mini 2 & Mini 3

== Gallery ==
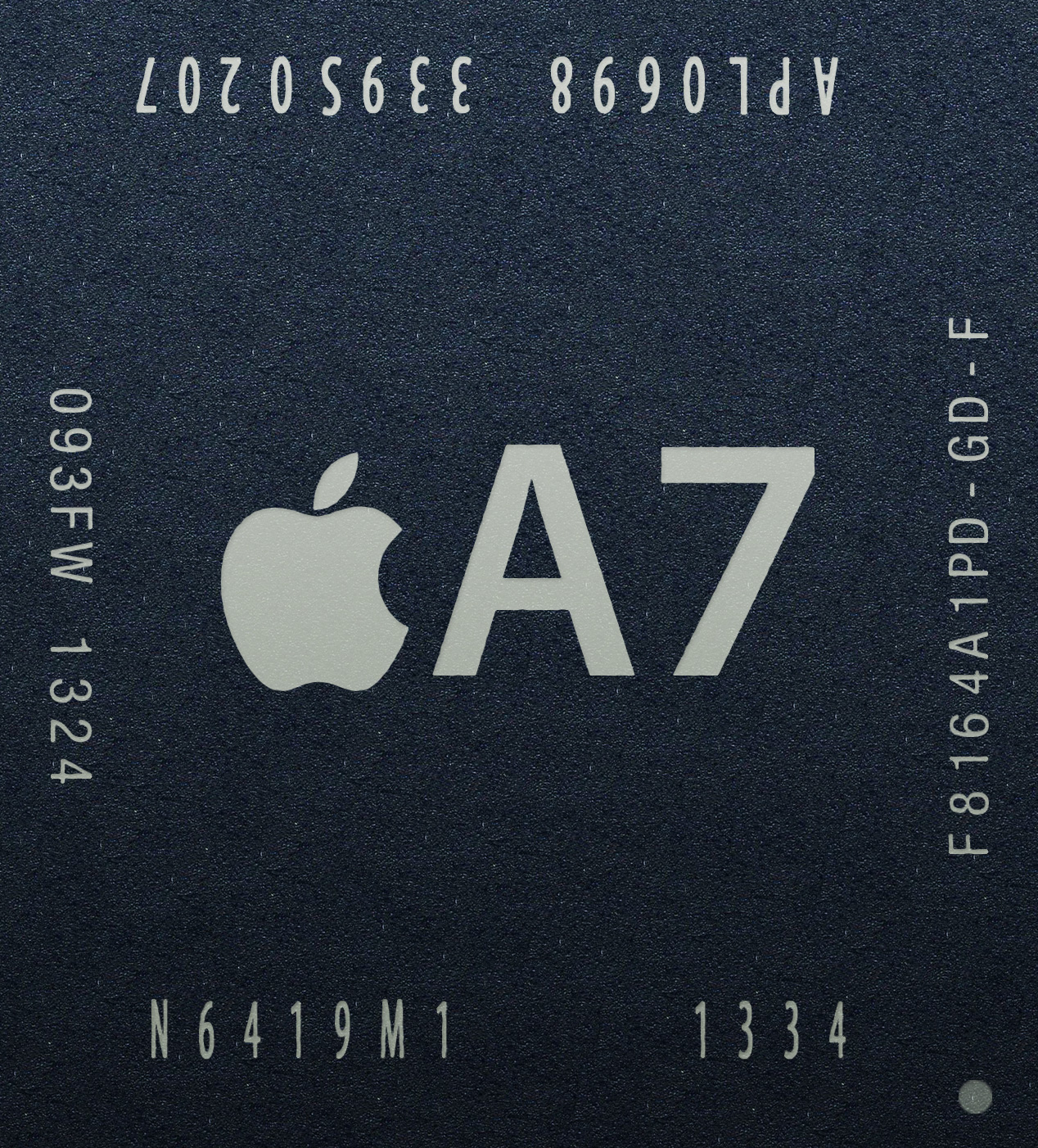
Artist's rendering of the 28 nm A7 APL0698 introduced in September 2013

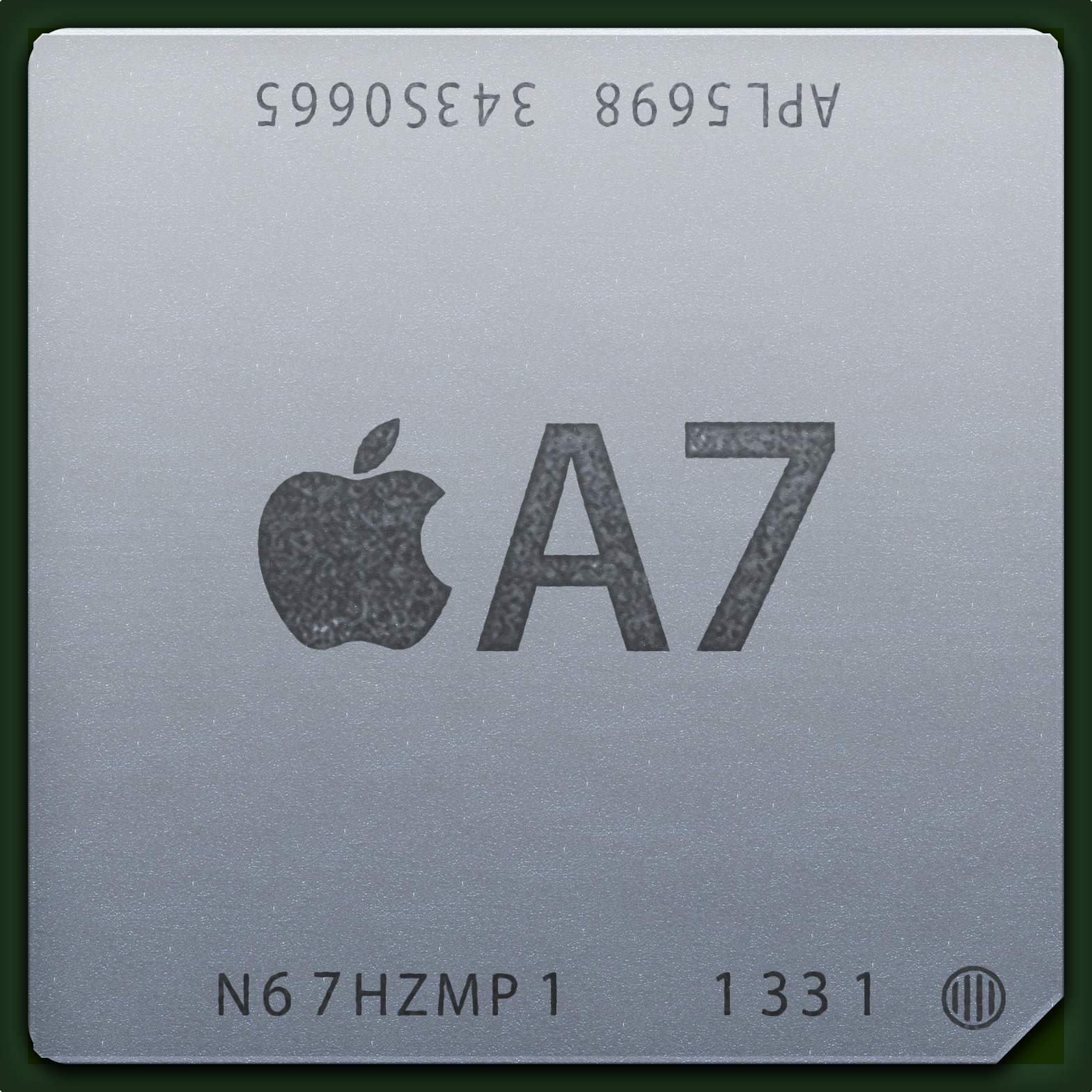
Artist's rendering of the 28 nm A7 APL5698 introduced in October 2013

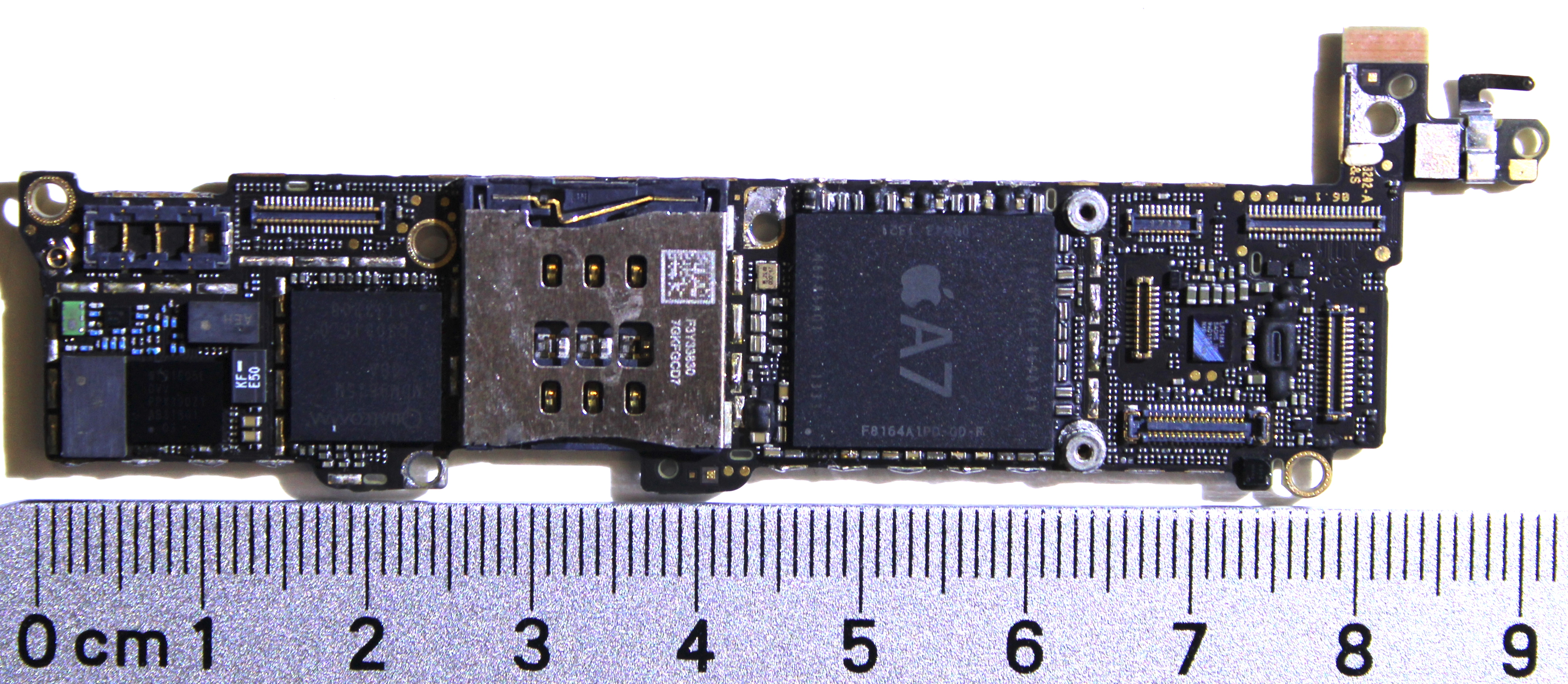
A7 (APL0698) SoC on iPhone 5s main logic board

== See also ==
- Apple silicon, the range of ARM-based processors designed by Apple
- Comparison of ARMv8-A cores

Preceded by Apple A6 (iPhone); Apple A6X (iPad)	Apple A7; 2013	Succeeded by Apple A8 (iPhone & iPad Mini); Apple A8X (iPad Air)
