= Apple A6 =

System-on-a-chip designed by Apple Inc.

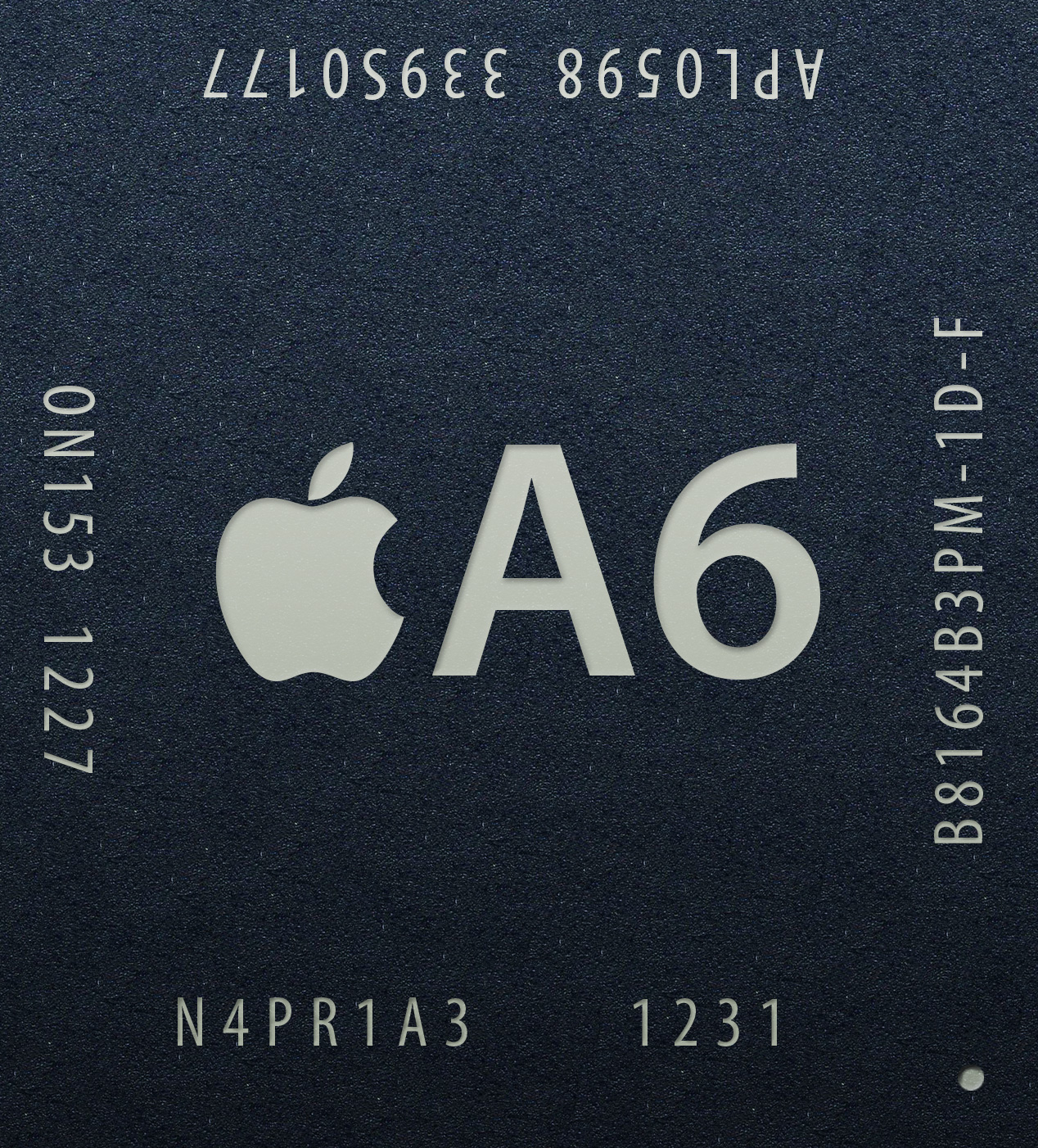
- The A6 processor

General information
- Launched: September 21, 2012
- Discontinued: September 9, 2015 (February 17, 2016 India)
- Designed by: Apple Inc.
- Common manufacturer: Samsung
- Product code: S5L8950X

Performance
- Max. CPU clock rate: 1.3 GHz

Physical specifications
- Cores: 2
- GPU: PowerVR SGX543MP3 (triple-core)

Cache
- L1 cache: 32 KB instruction + 32 KB data
- L2 cache: 1 MB

Architecture and classification
- Application: Mobile
- Technology node: 32 nm
- Microarchitecture: Swift
- Instruction set: ARMv7-A: ARM, Thumb-2 with "armv7s" extensions (integer division, VFPv4, Advanced SIMDv2)

Products, models, variants
- Variant: Apple A6X

History
- Predecessors: Apple A5 (iPhone); Apple A5X (iPad)
- Successor: Apple A7

The Apple A6 is a 32-bit package on package (PoP) system on a chip (SoC) designed by Apple Inc., part of the Apple silicon series. It was introduced on September 12, 2012, at the launch of the iPhone 5. Apple states that it is up to twice as fast and has up to twice the graphics power compared with its predecessor, the Apple A5. Software updates for devices using this chip ceased in 2019, with the release of iOS 10.3.4 on the iPhone 5 as it was discontinued with the release of iOS 11 in 2017.

== Design ==
The Apple A6 is said to use a 1.3 GHz custom Apple-designed ARMv7-A architecture based dual-core CPU, called Swift, rather than a licensed CPU from ARM like in previous designs, and an integrated 266 MHz triple-core PowerVR SGX543MP3 graphics processing unit (GPU). The Swift core in the A6 uses a new tweaked instruction set featuring some elements of the ARM Cortex-A15 such as support for the Advanced SIMD v2, and VFPv4. Analysis suggests that the Swift core has a triple-wide frontend and two FPUs, compared with a two-wide core with a single FPU in the Cortex-A9 based predecessor.

The A6 processor package also incorporates 1 GB of LPDDR2-1066 RAM compared with 512MB of LPDDR2-800 RAM in the Apple A5 providing double the memory capacity while increasing the theoretical memory bandwidth from 6.4 GB/s to 8.5 GB/s. The A6 includes an upgraded image signal processor (ISP), that compared with the ISP in the A5, improves the speed of image capture, low-light performance, noise reduction, and video stabilization.

The A6 is manufactured by Samsung on a high-κ metal gate (HKMG) 32 nm process and the chip is 96.71 mm^{2} large, which is 22% smaller than the A5. The A6 also consumes less energy than its predecessor.

A version of the A6 with higher frequency and four graphic cores is called Apple A6X and is found only in the fourth generation iPad.

== Products that include the Apple A6 ==
- iPhone 5
- iPhone 5C

== Gallery ==
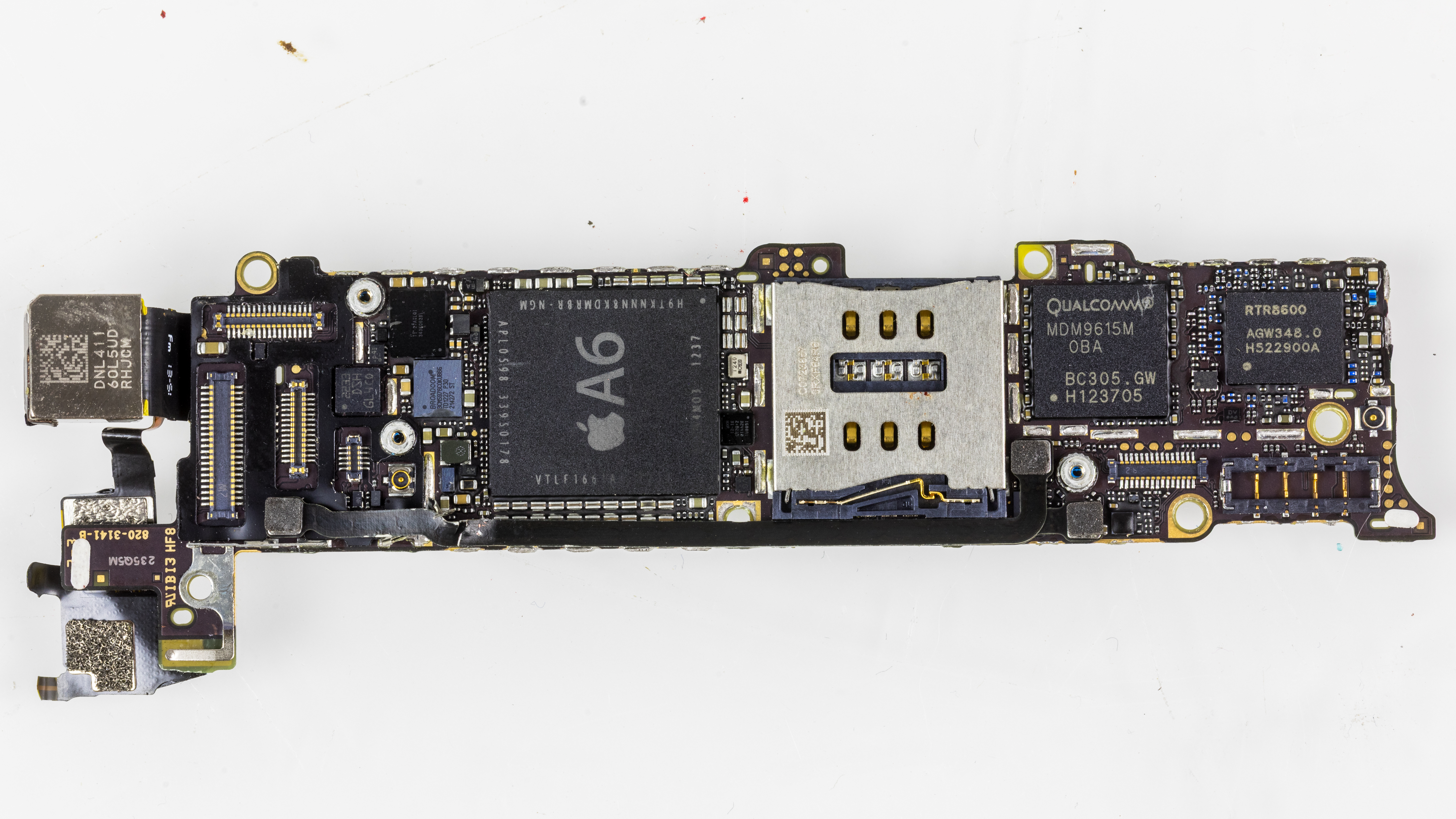
Apple A6 SoC on iPhone 5 main logic board

== See also ==
- Apple silicon, the range of ARM-based processors designed by Apple
- Apple A6X

Preceded by Apple A5	Apple A6; 2012	Succeeded by Apple A7 (APL0698 Variant)
