= IPad (4th generation) =

Tablet computer developed by Apple (2012–2014)

iPad

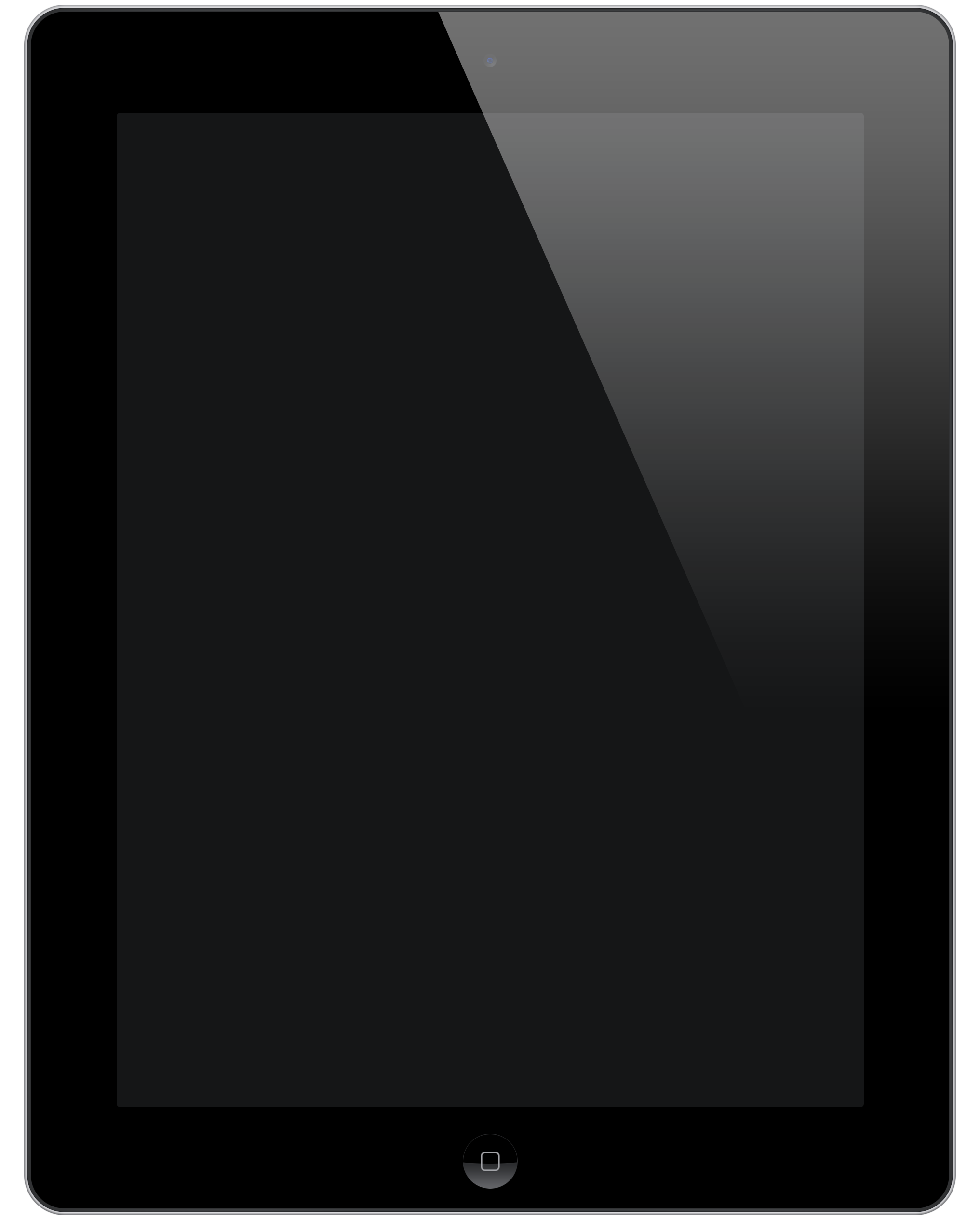
- iPad 4 in black
- Developer: Apple
- Manufacturer: Foxconn
- Product family: iPad
- Type: Tablet computer
- Generation: 4th
- Released: November 2, 2012: Australia; Austria; Belgium; Bulgaria; Canada; Czech Republic; Denmark; Finland; France; Germany; Hong Kong; Hungary; Iceland; Ireland; Italy; Japan; South Korea; Liechtenstein; Luxembourg; Mexico; Netherlands; New Zealand; Norway; Poland; Portugal; Puerto Rico; Romania; Singapore; Slovakia; Slovenia; Spain; Sweden; Switzerland; Thailand; United Kingdom; United States; November 27, 2012: Israel; December 6, 2012: Colombia; December 7, 2012: China; Malaysia; South Africa; December 9, 2012: India; December 12, 2012: United Arab Emirates; December 14, 2012: Brazil; Russia; Taiwan; December 21, 2012: Philippines
- Lifespan: 2012–2014
- Introductory price: US$499
- Discontinued: October 22, 2013 (original); October 16, 2014 (relaunch March 18, 2014)
- Units sold: 3 million iPad Minis and fourth-generation iPads were shipped in the first weekend of sale.
- Operating system: Original: iOS 6.0; Last: iOS 10.3.4; Wi-Fi + Cellular models: iOS 10.3.4, released July 22, 2019; Wi-Fi models: iOS 10.3.3, released July 19, 2017
- System on a chip: Apple A6X
- CPU: 1.4 GHz dual core Apple Swift
- Memory: 1 GB LPDDR2 RAM
- Storage: 16, 32, 64 or 128 GB flash memory
- Display: 9.7 inches (250 mm) 1536 x 2048 px color IPS LCD at (264 ppi) with a 4:3 aspect ratio, fingerprint-resistant oleophobic coating
- Graphics: Quad-core PowerVR SGX554MP4
- Input: Multi-touch screen, headset controls, proximity and ambient light sensors, 3-axis accelerometer, 3-axis gyroscope, digital compass
- Camera: Front: 1.2 MP; Rear: OmniVision Technologies OV5650 5.0 MP AF, iSight with Five Element Lens, Hybrid IR filter, video stabilisation, face detection, ƒ/2.4 aperture
- Connectivity: Wi-Fi 802.11 a/b/g/n at 2.4 GHz and 5 GHz Bluetooth 4.0 GSM UMTS / HSDPA 850, 1900, 2100 MHz GSM / EDGE 850, 900, 1800, 1900 MHz CDMA CDMA/EV-DO Rev. A 800, 1900 MHz GSM LTE 700, 800, 850, 900, 1700, 1800, 1900, 2100, 2600 MHz UMTS / HSDPA/HSPA+ / DC-HSDPA 850, 900, 1900, 2100 MHz GSM / EDGE 850, 900, 1800, 1900 MHz CDMA LTE 700 MHz CDMA/EV-DO Rev. A 800, 1900 MHz UMTS / HSDPA/HSPA+/DC-HSDPA 850, 900, 1900, 2100 MHz GSM / EDGE 850, 900, 1800, 1900 MHz
- Power: Built-in rechargeable Li-Po battery 11,560 mAh 3.7 V 42.5 W⋅h (153 kJ)
- Online services: App Store, iTunes Store, iBookstore, iCloud, Game Center
- Dimensions: 9.50 in (241 mm) (height); 7.31 in (186 mm) (width); 0.37 in (9.4 mm) (depth)
- Weight: Wi-Fi model: 1.44 lb (650 g); Wi-Fi + Cellular model: 1.46 lb (660 g)
- Predecessor: iPad (3rd generation)
- Successor: iPad Air (1st generation), iPad (5th generation)
- Related: iPad mini
- Website: iPad with Retina Display at the Wayback Machine (archived November 2, 2012)

The iPad (4th generation) (marketed as iPad with Retina display, colloquially referred to as the iPad 4) is a tablet computer developed and marketed by Apple. Compared to its predecessor, the third-generation iPad, the fourth-generation iPad maintained the Retina Display but featured new and upgraded components such as the Apple A6X chip and the Lightning connector, which was introduced on September 12, 2012. It shipped with iOS 6, which provides a platform for audio-visual media, including electronic books, periodicals, films, music, computer games, presentations and web content. Like the third-generation iPad it replaced, it was supported by five major iOS releases, in this case iOS 6, 7, 8, 9, and 10.

It was announced at a media conference on October 23, 2012, as the fourth generation of the iPad line, and was first released on November 2, 2012, in 35 countries, and then through December in ten other countries including China, India and Brazil. The third generation was discontinued following the fourth's announcement, after only seven months of general availability.

The device is available with either a black or white front glass panel and various connectivity and storage options. Storage size options include 16 GB, 32 GB, 64 GB, and 128 GB; the available connectivity options are Wi-Fi only and Wi-Fi + Cellular with LTE capabilities.

The fourth-generation iPad received positive reviews and was praised for its hardware improvements as well as the Retina display, which was also featured in the device's predecessor. Furthermore, benchmarks reveal that the fourth-generation iPad is able to perform CPU-reliant tasks twice as fast as its predecessor. During the first weekend of sales, an aggregated amount of 3 million fourth-generation iPads and iPads were sold.

== History ==
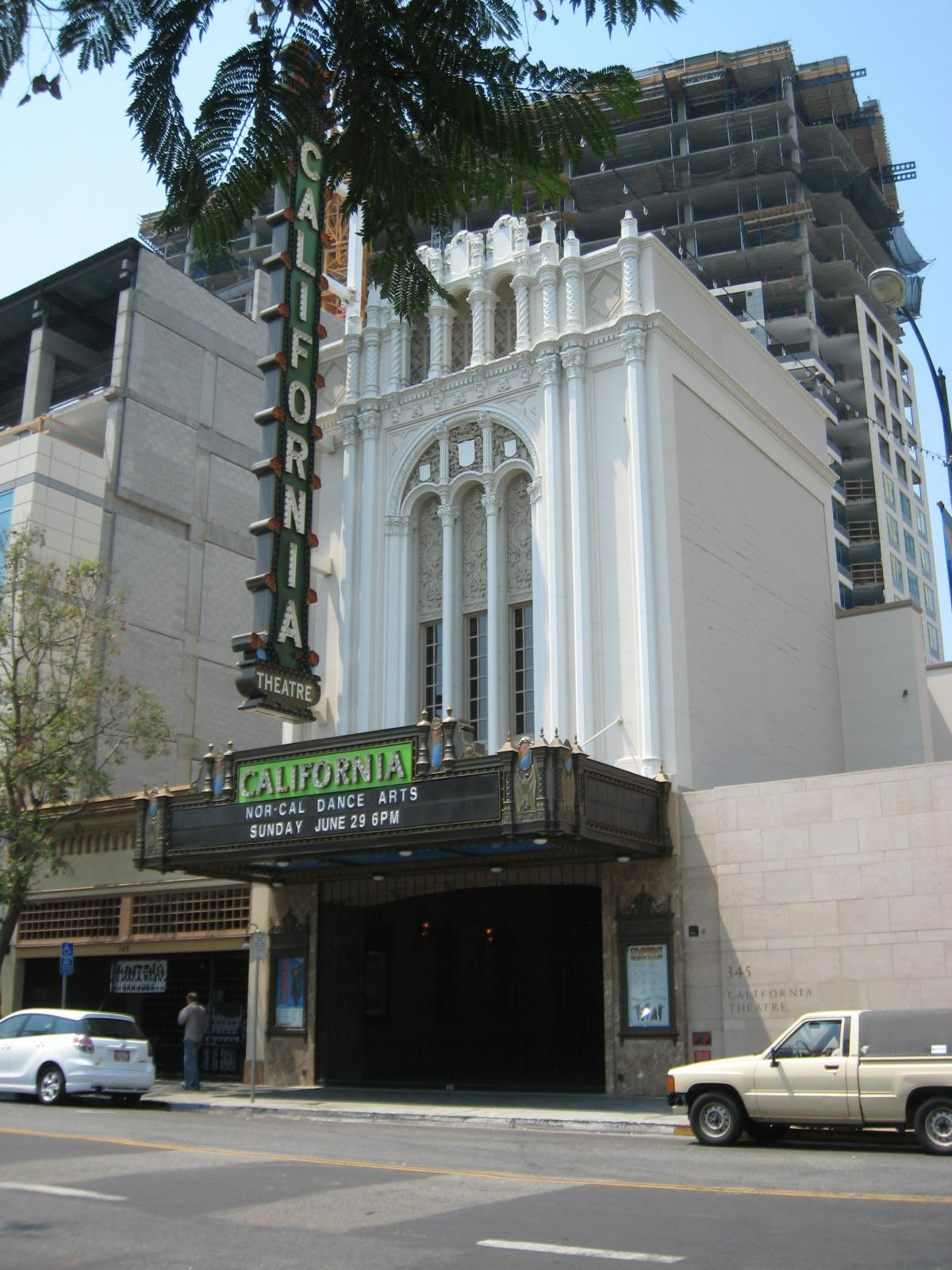
The California Theatre, where the fourth-generation iPad was announced on October 23, 2012

Rumors regarding the next-generation iPad emerged shortly after the release of the third-generation iPad. At that point some speculated that the next iPad released would be of a smaller size. Further speculations emerged in July 2012 when DigiTimes, with the help of unspecified sources, claimed that Apple made small revisions to the then upcoming iPad and scheduled its release for late 2012. On October 16, 2012, Apple announced a media event scheduled for October 23 at the California Theatre in San Jose, California. The company did not pre-disclose the subject of the event, but it was widely expected to be regarding the iPad Mini. Photographic images of the device's dock connector and front camera emerged shortly before the media event.

At the media event, Apple CEO Tim Cook introduced a new version of iBooks and new generations of the MacBook Pro, Mac Mini, and the iMac before unveiling the fourth-generation iPad and the lower-end iPad Mini. During the unveiling, Apple stated that the fourth-generation iPad would be available to pre-order online in a selected number of countries starting October 26. On November 2, Apple released the Wi-Fi model of device in 35 countries across Europe, East Asia and North America. The cellular model was released in-store a few weeks after the initial release of the device.

The release of the fourth-generation iPad led to the discontinuation of its predecessor, which angered many third-generation iPad users. In response, Apple extended its 14-day return policy to 30 days. ITProPortal noted that, since the price of both models is identical, consumers that purchased the third-generation iPad within this time frame were effectively allowed to exchange their discontinued device for the fourth-generation model.

On January 29, 2013, Apple announced and scheduled the launch of the 128 GB variant of 4th generation iPad. It was released on February 5, 2013.

Following the announcement of the iPad Air on October 22, 2013, sales of the fourth-generation iPad were discontinued. The fourth-generation iPad was reintroduced on March 18, 2014, following the discontinuation of the iPad 2. In order to make its reintroduction a low-end device to the iPad Air, its price was cut by 20% over its original launch price. On October 16, 2014, the fourth-generation iPad was discontinued in favor of the iPad Air 2; the iPad Air took its place as the entry-level iPad at that time.

== Features ==
=== Software ===
The fourth-generation iPad shipped with iOS 6.0 and later, iOS 7. It can act as a hotspot with some carriers, sharing its Internet connection over Wi-Fi, Bluetooth, or USB, and also access the Apple App Store, a digital application distribution platform for iOS. The service allows users to browse and download applications from the iTunes Store that were developed with Xcode and the iOS SDK and were published through Apple. From the App Store, GarageBand, iMovie, iPhoto, and the iWork apps (Pages, Keynote, and Numbers) are available.

The iPad comes with several pre-installed applications, including Siri, Safari, Mail, Photos, Video, Music, iTunes, App Store, Maps, Notes, Calendar, Game Center, Photo Booth, and Contacts. Like all iOS devices, the iPad can sync content and other data with a Mac or PC using iTunes, although iOS 5 and later can be managed and backed up without a computer. Although the tablet is not designed to make phone calls over a cellular network, users can use a headset or the built-in speaker and microphone to place phone calls over Wi-Fi or cellular using a VoIP application, such as Skype. The device has a dictation application, using the same voice recognition technology as the iPhone 4S. The user speaks and the iPad types what they say on the screen, though the iPad must have an internet connection available (via Wi-Fi or cellular network) due to the feature's reliance on Apple servers to translate the speech.

The fourth-generation iPad has an optional iBooks application, which displays books and other ePub-format content downloaded from iBooks. Several major book publishers including Penguin Books, HarperCollins, Simon & Schuster, and Macmillan have committed to publishing books for the device. Despite being a direct competitor to both the Amazon Kindle and Barnes & Noble Nook, both Amazon.com and Barnes & Noble offer e-reader apps for the iPad.

The 4th generation iPad, unlike its immediate predecessor, the 3rd generation iPad, is supported by iOS 10; however, it was announced at the Apple WWDC 2017 that the 4th generation iPad (along with the iPhone 5/5C) will not support iOS 11, as it is a 32-bit iPad. iOS 10.3.3 is the latest and final version of iOS to include support for the Wi-Fi only models of these devices. iOS 10.3.4 is the latest and final version of iOS to include support for the cellular models of these devices, released to fix an issue caused by the GPS week number rollover.

=== Hardware ===
The device has an Apple A6X SoC which comprises a 32-bit Apple dual-core CPU running at 1.4 GHz and a quad-core PowerVR SGX554MP4 GPU, 1 GB of RAM. It also features a 5-megapixel, rear-facing camera capable of 1080p video recording; and a 720p HD front-facing videophone camera designed for FaceTime. The device features a 9.7-inch (250 mm) (diagonal) display with a resolution of 2,048 by 1,536 (QXGA) resulting in 3.1 million pixels, this gives the display a pixel density of 264 ppi. The total number of pixels used in the display of the fourth-generation iPad is four times that of the iPad 2 – providing even scaling from the prior model.

As with all previous generations of iPhone and iPad hardware, there are four buttons and one switch on the fourth-generation iPad. With the device in its portrait orientation, these are: a "home" button on the face of the device under the display that returns the user to the home screen, a wake/sleep button on the top edge of the device, and two buttons on the upper right side of the device performing volume up/down functions, above which is a switch whose function varies according to device settings, generally functioning either to switch the device into or out of silent mode or to lock/unlock the orientation of the screen. Externally, the fourth-generation iPad is identical to its predecessor apart from the differences between dock connectors used and change of manufacturers that produce the display. In addition, the Wi-Fi only version weighs 652 grams while the cellular model weighs 662 grams – 2 grams heavier than their respective predecessors. The display responds to other sensors: an ambient light sensor to adjust screen brightness and a 3-axis accelerometer to sense orientation and switch between portrait and landscape modes. Unlike the iPhone and iPod Touch's built-in applications, which work in three orientations (portrait, landscape-left and landscape-right), the iPad's built-in applications support screen rotation in all four orientations, including upside-down. Consequently, the device has no intrinsic "native" orientation; only the relative position of the home button changes.

The tablet is manufactured either with or without the capability to communicate over a cellular network. All models can connect to a wireless LAN via Wi-Fi. The fourth-generation iPad is available with 16, 32, 64 or 128 GB of internal flash memory, with no expansion option. Apple sells a "camera connection kit" with an SD card reader, but it can only be used to transfer photos and videos.

The audio playback of the fourth-generation iPad has a frequency response of 20 Hz to 20,000 Hz. Without third-party software it can play the following audio formats: HE-AAC, AAC, Protected AAC, MP3, MP3 VBR, Audible formats (2, 3, 4, AEA, AAX, and AAX+), ALAC, AIFF, and WAV.

This iPad uses an internal rechargeable lithium-ion polymer (LiPo) battery that can hold a charge of 11,560 mAh. The batteries are made in Taiwan by Simplo Technology (60%) and Dynapack International Technology (40%). The iPad is designed to be charged with a relatively high current of 2 amps using the included 12 W USB power adapter and Lightning connector. While it can be charged by an older USB port from a computer, these are limited to 500 milliamps (0.5 amps). As a result, if the iPad is in use while powered by a computer, it may charge very slowly, or not at all. High-power USB ports found in newer computers and accessories provide full charging capabilities. Apple claims that the battery can provide up to 10 hours of video, audio playback, or web surfing on Wi-Fi, 9 hours of web surfing over a cellular connection, or one month on standby. Like any rechargeable battery, the iPad's battery loses capacity over time. However, the iPad's battery is not user-replaceable. In a program similar to iPod and iPhone battery-replacement programs, Apple promised to replace an iPad that does not hold an electrical charge with a refurbished unit for a fee. During the battery replacement process, user data is not preserved/transferred, and repaired or refurbished units come with a new case. The warranty on the refurbished unit may vary between jurisdictions.

The iPad (4th generation) was the last iPad that has a 32-bit processor and one of the last Apple products to have a 32-bit processor, along with the iPhone 5 and iPhone 5C, which has the A6 chips.

=== Accessories ===
Apple Lightning connector

The Smart Cover, introduced with the iPad 2, is a screen protector that magnetically attaches to the face of the iPad. The cover has three folds which allow it to convert into a stand, which is also held together by magnets. The Smart Cover can also assume other positions by folding it. Smart Covers have a microfiber bottom that cleans the front of the iPad and wakes up the unit when the cover is removed. It comes in five colors of both polyurethane and the more expensive leather.

Apple offers several other accessories, most of which are adapters for the proprietary Lightning connector, the only port besides the headphone jack. A dock holds the iPad at an angle, and has a dock connector and audio line-out port. The iPad can use Bluetooth keyboards that also work with Macs and PCs. The iPad can be charged by a standalone power adapter ("wall charger") compatible with iPods and iPhones, and a 12 watt charger is included.

== Reception ==
The fourth-generation iPad received positive reviews from critics and commentators. The review by Gareth Beavis of TechRadar praised the device for its high-resolution Retina Display, which TechRadar wrote is "...one of the most impressive we've seen on a tablet to date." However, the reviewer also wrote that the screen "lacks the 'punch' seen in Super AMOLED screens seen on devices like the Samsung Galaxy Note 2." The review also praised the interface of the iPad for its simple design and easy to use layout. Additionally, other aspects, such as the design of the iPad and updated SoC were noted and praised in the review. Critically, Beavis noted that the iPad can still moderately heat up under medium usage, however not to the extent seen in the third-generation iPad. Tim Stevens of Engadget praised the Retina Display and labelled it as the best screen available on tablets. Benchmarks and tests conducted by Engadget resulted in Stevens concluding that the fourth-generation iPad is the fastest Apple mobile device available, surpassing a "record" that the iPhone 5 held for a brief period.

Benchmark tests conducted by SlashGear concluded that the SoC of the fourth-generation iPad is able to perform CPU-reliant tasks more than twice as fast as that of the third-generation iPad. A series of benchmark tests conducted on the graphics performance of the fourth-generation iPad by Anandtech resulted in the device achieving the highest score compared to other consumer mobile devices, including the Samsung Galaxy S III, Nexus 10 and third-generation iPad. The performance increase of the fourth-generation iPad varies between tests, however an increase is nonetheless evident. Furthermore, battery longevity tests conducted by the same organization suggests that the battery of the fourth-generation iPad is able to last longer than its predecessor. However, the battery of the updated iPad 2 is able to outlast the fourth-generation iPad.

=== Commercial reception ===
In the first weekend of sales of the iPad Mini and fourth-generation iPad, Apple reported that it sold an aggregated number of 3 million units. TechRadar noted that the first weekend sales figures for the fourth-generation iPad are lower than corresponding figures for the third-generation iPad, which sold 3 million units in its first weekend. Subsequent reports and analysis such as that from David Hsieh, a technology analyst, suggest that the iPad mini is selling better than the fourth-generation iPad. Despite the noted slump in sales, Apple's stock price, in direct response to the figures released, rose by 1.4% to $584.62 on November 5.

=== Criticism ===
In a repairability review conducted by iFixit, the fourth-generation iPad scored 2 out of 10 (10 being the easiest to repair) due to the use of adhesive to attach components. However, reviewers noted that several components such as the screen and battery could be removed easily for replacement.

== Timeline ==
Timeline of iPad models
See also: List of Apple products

Source: Apple Newsroom Archive.

== See also ==
- iPad accessories
- Comparison of tablet computers
- E-book reader
- Nexus 10

Preceded by iPad (3rd generation)	iPad (4th generation); 2012	Succeeded by iPad Air iPad (5th generation)
