= Apple A5 =

System-on-a-chip designed by Apple Inc.

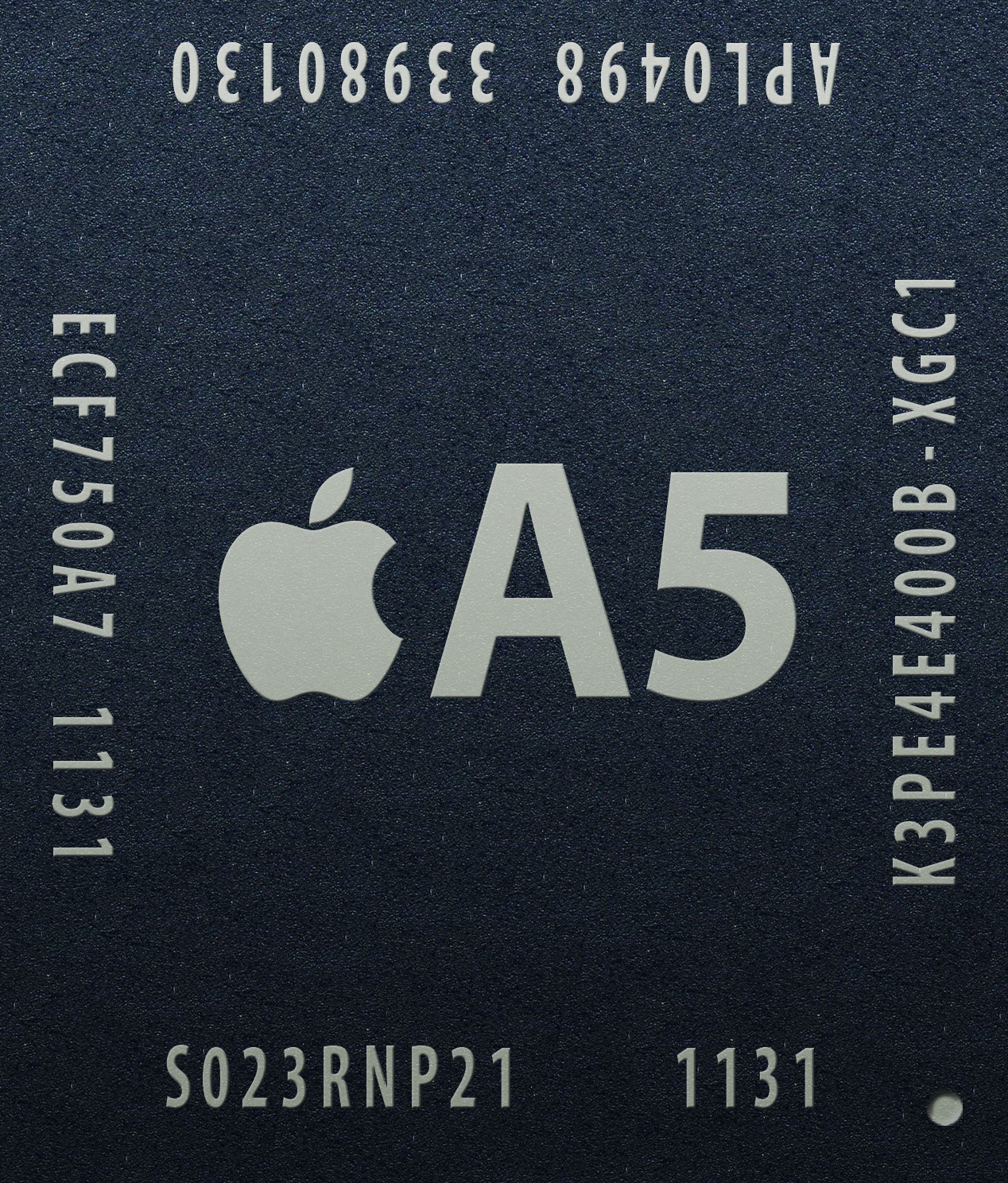
- Apple A5 (S5L8940 version) chip

General information
- Launched: March 11, 2011
- Discontinued: October 4, 2016
- Designed by: Apple Inc.
- Common manufacturer: Samsung Electronics
- Product code: S5L8940X (A5); S5L8942X (A5R2); S5L8947X (A5R3)

Performance
- Max. CPU clock rate: 800 MHz to 1 GHz

Physical specifications
- Cores: 1 (third-generation Rev A Apple TV) 2 (iPad 2, iPhone 4S, third-generation Apple TV [one core is disabled], fifth-generation iPod Touch, first-generation iPad Mini)
- GPU: PowerVR SGX543MP2 (dual-core)

Cache
- L1 cache: 32 KB instruction + 32 KB data
- L2 cache: 1 MB

Architecture and classification
- Application: Mobile
- Technology node: 45 nm to 32 nm
- Microarchitecture: ARM Cortex-A9
- Instruction set: ARM, Thumb-2

Products, models, variants
- Variant: Apple A5X

History
- Predecessor: Apple A4
- Successor: Apple A6

The Apple A5 is a 32-bit system on a chip (SoC) designed by Apple Inc., part of the Apple silicon series, and manufactured by Samsung. The first product Apple featured an A5 in was the iPad 2. Apple claimed during their media event on March 2, 2011, that the ARM Cortex-A9 central processing unit (CPU) in the A5 is up to two times faster than the CPU in the Apple A4, and the PowerVR SGX543MP2 graphics processing unit (GPU) in the A5 is up to nine times faster than the GPU in the A4. Apple also claimed that the A5 uses the same amount of power as the A4.

The last operating system update Apple provided for a mobile device containing an A5 (iPad 2 CDMA, iPhone 4S, and first-generation iPad Mini cellular models) was iOS 9.3.6, which was released on July 22, 2019, as they were discontinued with the release of iOS 10 in 2016. The latest operating system update Apple has provided for an Apple TV containing an A5 (third-generation Apple TV and third-generation Rev A Apple TV) was Apple TV Software 7.9, which was released on March 14, 2022.

== Design ==
The A5 chip features a dual-core 45 nm Cortex-A9 CPU (shrunk to 32 nm in later versions of the chip) including the Advanced SIMD (Neon) extension, and a dual-core 32 nm PowerVR SGX543MP2 GPU.

The A5 integrates an image signal processor unit (ISP) that can perform advanced image post-processing, such as face detection, white balance, and automatic image stabilization. The A5 also directly integrates Audience earSmart technology for removing surrounding background noise and secondary voices during phone calls.

The clock rate of the Cortex-A9 in the A5 used inside the iPad 2 and first-generation iPad Mini is 1 GHz. Unlike the A4, the A5 can run at slower clocks to conserve power. The clock rate of the Cortex-A9 in the A5 used inside the iPhone 4S and fifth-generation iPod Touch is 800 MHz. The A5's clock speed inside third-generation Apple TV is unknown.

When the A5 was first released, the production cost of the chip was estimated to be 75% more than the A4, with the difference expected to diminish when production would later increase. As of August 2012, the A5 was manufactured at Samsung's Austin, Texas factory. Samsung invested $3.6 billion in the Austin facility to produce various chips, and nearly all of the facility's output was dedicated to producing Apple chips. Samsung later invested a further $4.2 billion in the Austin facility in order to transition to a 28 nm fabrication process by the second half of 2013.

== Apple A5 versions ==
Three versions of the A5 chip exist: S5L8940 (containing a 45 nm CPU), S5L8942 (containing a 32 nm CPU), and S5L8947 (containing a single-core 32 nm CPU). Apple also designed a separate high-performance variant of the A5 called the Apple A5X, which features a wider memory subsystem and two additional GPU cores. The A5X was used only in the third-generation iPad.

=== Apple A5 (S5L8940) ===
The S5L8940 version of the A5 was used in the iPad 2 and the iPhone 4S. The CPU was manufactured on a 45 nm fabrication process. The die of this version takes up 122.2 mm^{2} of area. It uses the PoP method of installation to support RAM. The top package contains two 256 MB LPDDR2 chips, providing a total of 512 MB of RAM.

=== Apple A5R2 (S5L8942) ===
The S5L8942 version of the A5 was used in the third-generation Apple TV (one CPU core is disabled), the iPad 2 (iPad2,4 revision), the fifth-generation iPod Touch, and the first-generation iPad Mini. The CPU was manufactured on a 32 nm fabrication process. The die of this version takes up 69.6 mm^{2} of area—nearly 41% smaller than the die of the S5L8940 version. Like the S5L8940 version, it uses the PoP method of installation to support RAM. The top package contains two 256 MB LPDDR2 chips, providing a total of 512 MB of RAM.

=== Apple A5R3 (S5L8947) ===
The S5L8947 version of the A5 was used only in the third-generation Rev A Apple TV. Unlike the previous two A5 versions, this version contains only one CPU core. Also unlike the previous two A5 versions, this version does not use the PoP method of installation to support RAM—RAM is found externally from the A5 chip. The die of this version takes up 37.8mm^{2} of area, using a new design made specifically for the third-generation Rev A Apple TV.

== Products featuring the Apple A5 ==
- iPad 2
- iPhone 4S
- Apple TV (3rd generation)
- iPod Touch (5th generation)
- iPad Mini (1st generation)
- Apple TV (3rd generation Rev A)

== Gallery ==
These images are illustrations and approximate to scale.

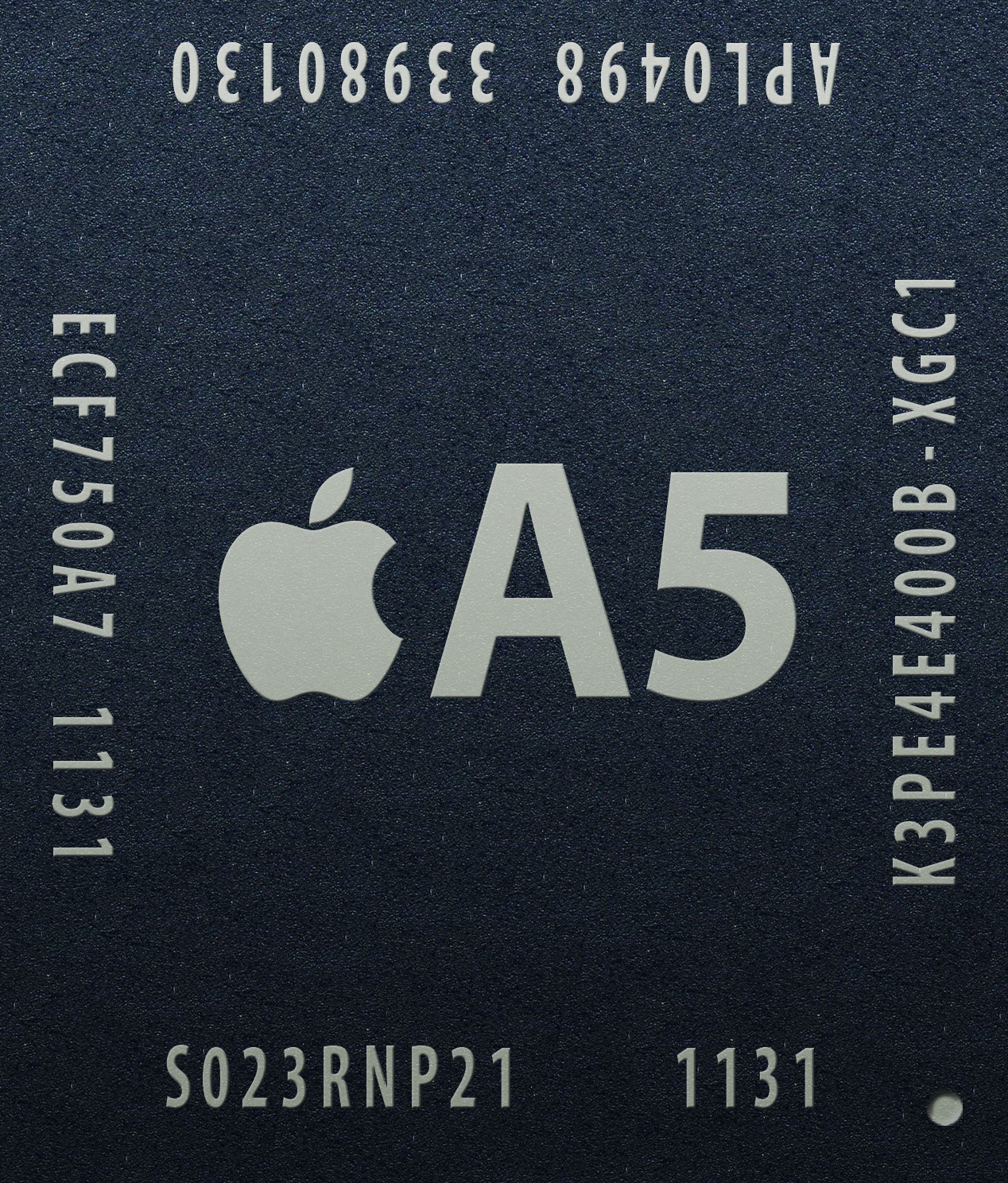
The A5 (S5L8940) first started shipping in products March 2011.

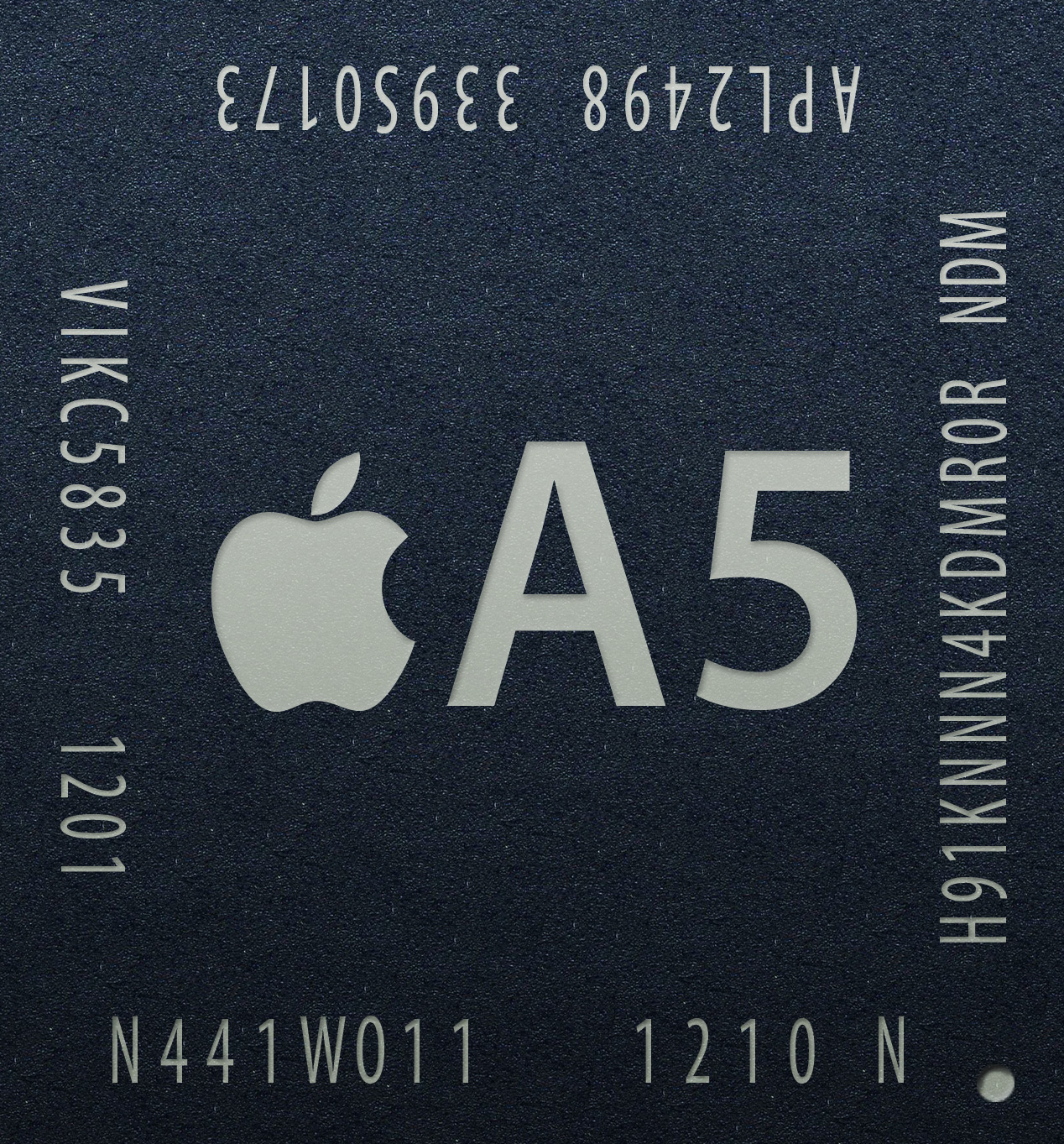
The A5R2 (S5L8942) first started shipping in products March 2012.

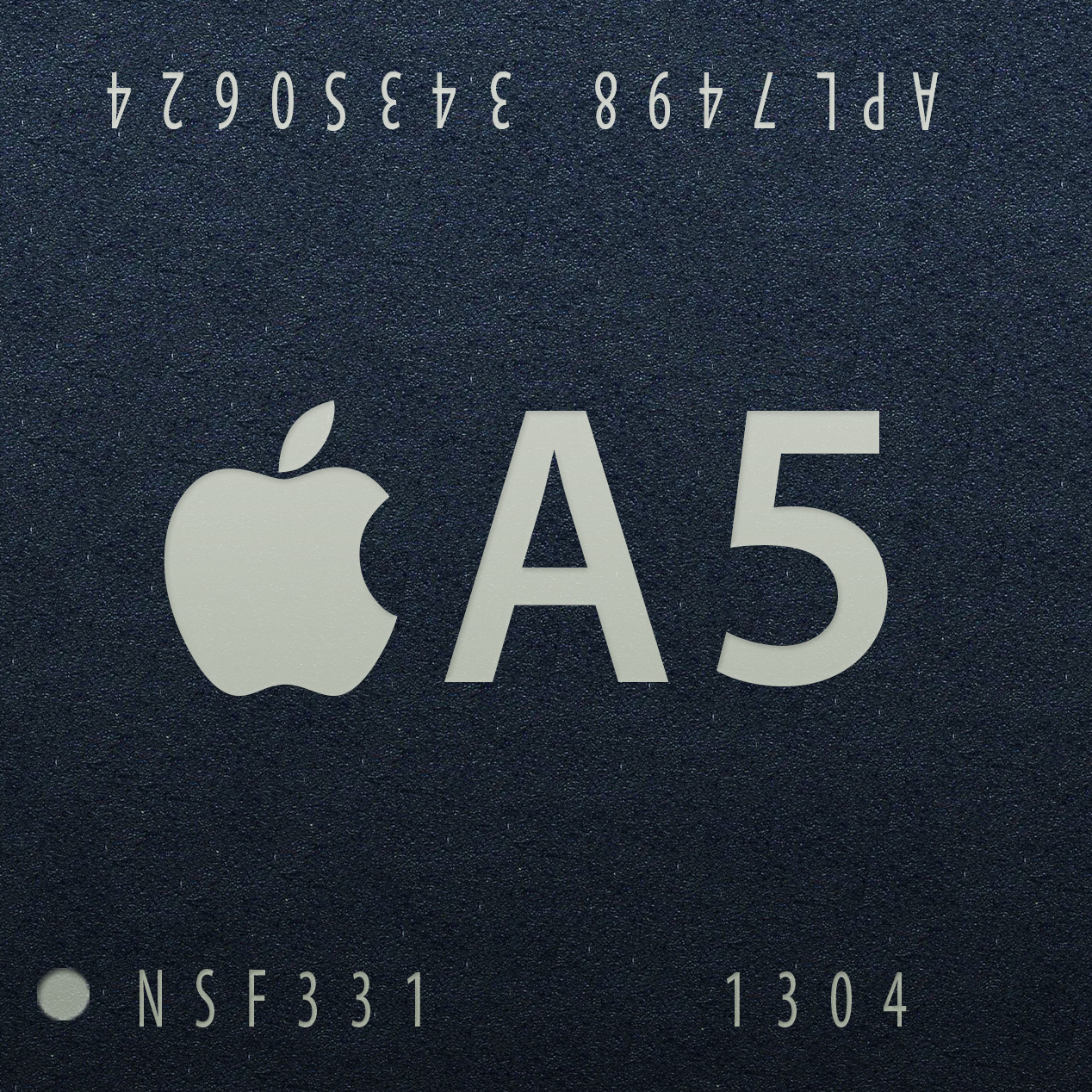
The A5R3 (S5L8947) first started shipping in products January 2013.

Sizes: A5 (10.1 mm x 12.2 mm), A5R2 (8.1 mm x 8.6 mm), A5R3 (6.1 mm x 6.3 mm)

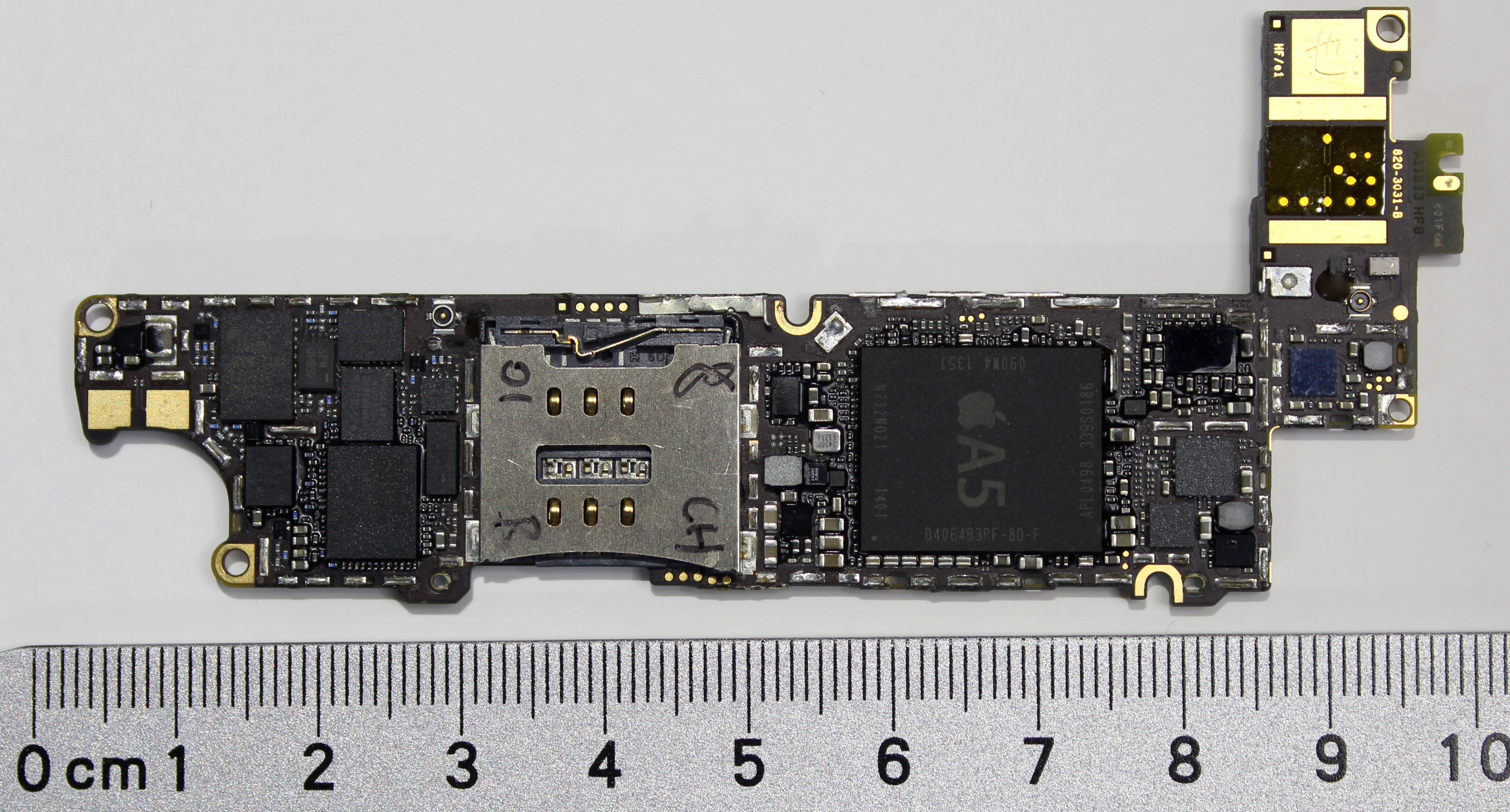
Apple A5 SoC (APL0498) on iPhone 4s main logic board

== See also ==
- Apple A5X
- Apple silicon, the range of ARM-based SoCs designed by Apple
- PWRficient, a series of microprocessors designed by P.A. Semi. Apple acquired P.A. Semi to form an in-house custom chip design department.

Preceded by Apple A4	Apple A5; 2011	Succeeded by Apple A6
