= Apple A6X =

System on a chip (SoC) designed by Apple Inc.

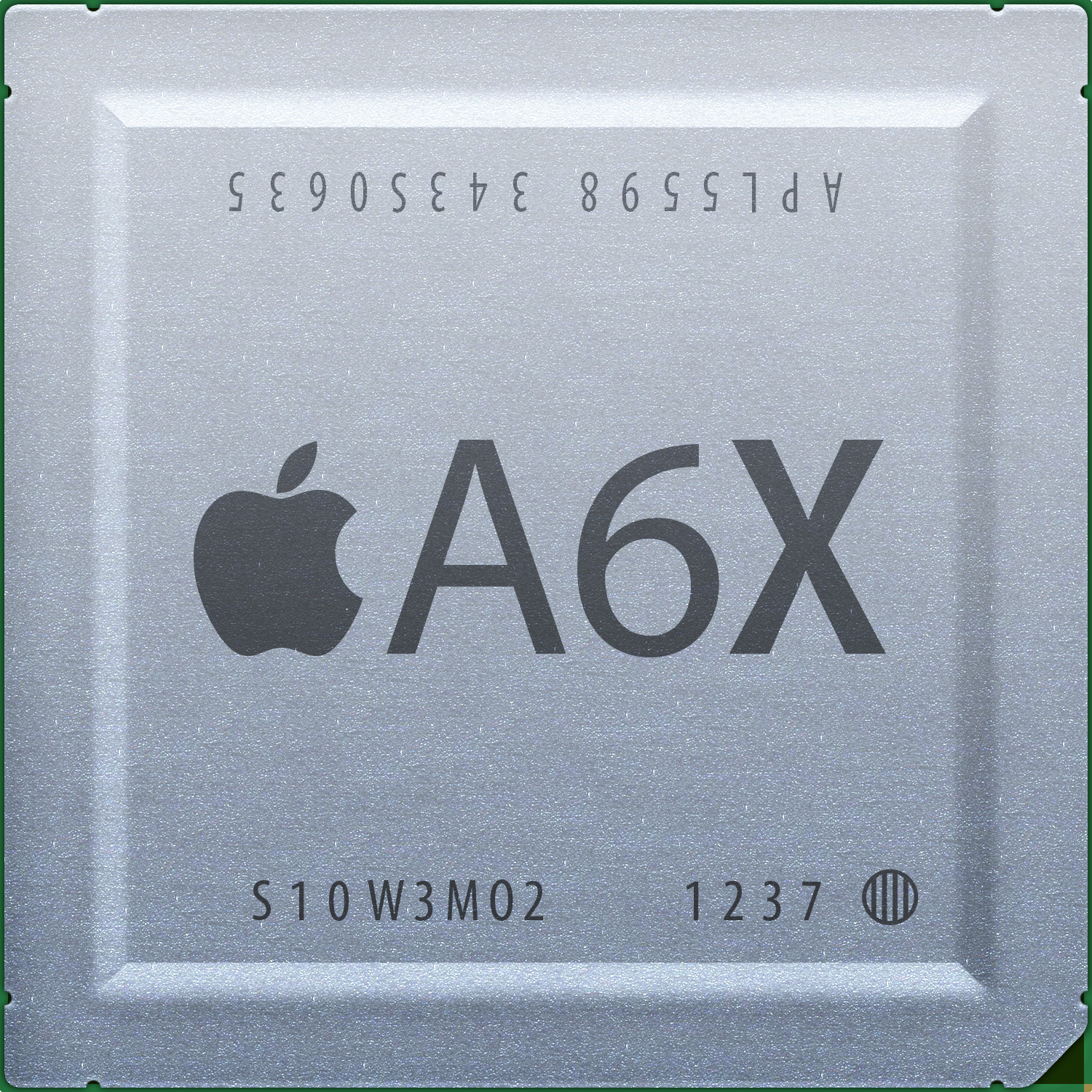
- The A6X chip used in the fourth-generation iPad

General information
- Launched: November 2, 2012
- Discontinued: October 16, 2014
- Designed by: Apple Inc.
- Common manufacturer: Samsung Electronics
- Product code: S5L8955X

Performance
- Max. CPU clock rate: 1.4 GHz

Physical specifications
- Cores: 2
- GPU: PowerVR SGX554MP4 (quad-core)

Cache
- L1 cache: 32 KB instruction + 32 KB data
- L2 cache: 1 MB

Architecture and classification
- Application: Mobile
- Technology node: 32 nm.
- Microarchitecture: Swift
- Instruction set: ARMv7-A: ARM, Thumb-2 with "armv7s" extensions (integer division, VFPv4, Advanced SIMDv2)

Products, models, variants
- Variant: Apple A6

History
- Predecessor: Apple A5X
- Successor: Apple A7 (APL5698 variant)

The Apple A6X is a 32-bit system-on-a-chip (SoC) designed by Apple Inc., part of the Apple silicon series. It was introduced with and only used in the 4th generation iPad, on October 23, 2012. It is a high-performance variant of the Apple A6 and the last 32-bit chip Apple used on an iOS device before Apple switched to 64-bit. Apple claims the A6X has twice the CPU performance and up to twice the graphics performance of its predecessor, the Apple A5X. Software updates for the 4th generation iPad ended in 2019 with the release of iOS 10.3.4 for cellular models, thus ceasing support for this chip as it was discontinued with the release of iOS 11 in 2017.

== Design ==
The A6X features a 1.4 GHz custom Apple-designed ARMv7-A architecture based dual-core CPU called Swift, introduced in the Apple A6. It includes an integrated quad-core PowerVR SGX554MP4 graphics processing unit (GPU) running at 300 MHz and a quad-channel memory subsystem. The memory subsystem supports LPDDR2-1066 DRAM, increasing the theoretical memory bandwidth to 17 GB/s.

Unlike the A6, but similar to the A5X, the A6X is covered with a metal heat spreader, includes no RAM, and is not a package-on-package (PoP) assembly. The A6X is manufactured by Samsung on a High-κ metal gate (HKMG) 32 nm process. It has a die with an area of 123 mm^{2}, 30% larger than the A6.

== Products that include the Apple A6X ==
- iPad (4th generation)

== See also ==
- Apple silicon, the range of ARM-based processors designed by Apple.
- Apple A6
