= Apple A5X =

System-on-a-chip designed by Apple Inc.

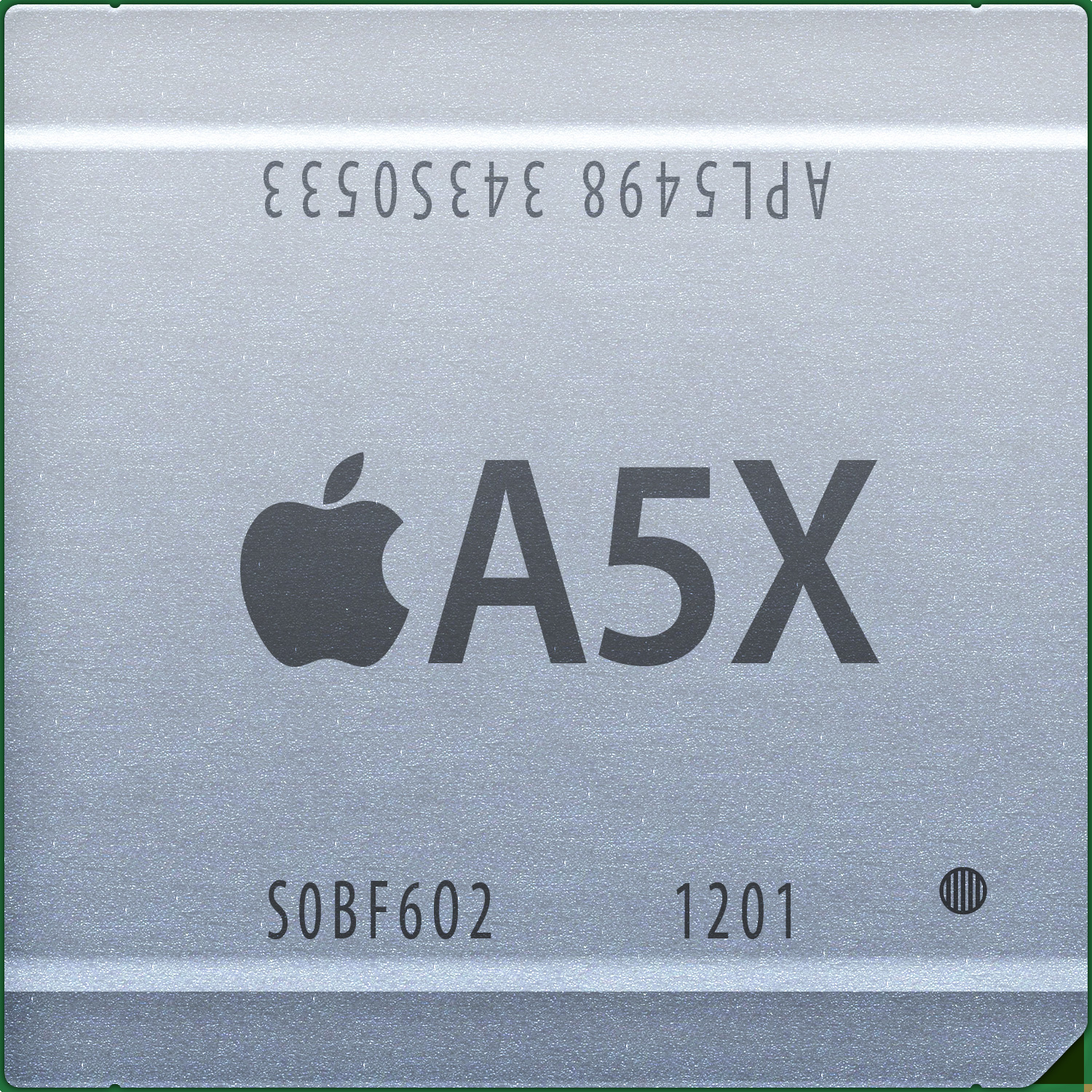

General information
- Launched: March 16, 2012
- Discontinued: October 23, 2012
- Designed by: Apple Inc.
- Common manufacturer: Samsung Electronics
- Product code: S5L8945X

Performance
- Max. CPU clock rate: 1 GHz

Physical specifications
- Cores: 2
- GPU: PowerVR SGX543MP4 (quad-core)

Cache
- L1 cache: 32 KB instruction + 32 KB data
- L2 cache: 1 MB

Architecture and classification
- Application: Mobile
- Technology node: 45 nm
- Microarchitecture: ARM Cortex-A9
- Instruction set: ARMv7

Products, models, variants
- Variant: Apple A5

History
- Successor: Apple A6X

The Apple A5X is a 32-bit system on a chip (SoC) designed by Apple Inc., part of the Apple silicon series, and manufactured by Samsung. It was introduced with and used only in the third-generation iPad, on March 7, 2012. The A5X is a high-performance variant of the Apple A5. Apple claimed the quad-core PowerVR SGX543MP4 graphics processing unit (GPU) in the A5X is two times faster than the GPU in the A5, as the A5X GPU contains two more cores than the dual-core version GPU in the A5.

The last operating system update Apple provided for a mobile device containing an A5X (third-generation iPad cellular models) was iOS 9.3.6, which was released on July 22, 2019 as it was discontinued with the release of iOS 10 in 2016.

== Design ==
Apple designed the A5X chip specifically for the third-generation iPad to provide the additional graphical performance it required for its new Retina display. The A5X chip features a dual-core 45 nm ARM Cortex-A9 CPU with a clock rate of 1 GHz, and a quad-core 32 nm PowerVR SGX543MP4 GPU with a clock rate of 250 MHz. Compared to the A5, the memory interface of the A5X is twice the size. The A5X memory interface subsystem utilizes four 32 bits wide LPDDR2 memory controllers.

Unlike the Apple A4 and the A5, the A5X uses a metal heat spreader (along with thermal paste) to cover the flip chip underneath. The die takes up 162.94 mm^{2} of area—a 36.5% increase in area used over the 119.32 mm^{2} die of the S5L8940 version of the A5. The A5X does not use the package on package (PoP) method of installation to support RAM—RAM is found externally from the A5X chip.

== Products featuring the Apple A5X ==
- iPad (3rd generation)

== See also ==
- Apple silicon, the range of ARM-based SoCs designed by Apple for their products.
