= Batterygate =

iPhone controversy

Batterygate refers to the 2017 scandal surrounding deliberate processor slowdowns by Apple on iPhones with degraded batteries, causing reduced performance. Apple at first denied purposely slowing down processors, before later admitting that they did so in response to widespread reports of unexpected shutdowns across multiple iPhone models. The controversy concluded with Apple offering discounted battery replacements through the year 2018, and later agreeing to pay up to $500 million to settle class-action lawsuits concerning the scandal.

The scandal first emerged in late-2016, when it was reported that since a recent iOS update, some iPhones had begun to experience unexpected shutdowns. Apple first stated this only affected "a very small number" of iPhone 6s devices; they later stated that the issue was more widespread, and issued an iOS update to determine the cause.

In January 2017, Apple released iOS version 10.2.1, and in a statement to TechCrunch claimed that the update reduced the unexpected shutdowns by 80% in iPhone 6s devices and 70% in iPhone 6 devices. In December 2017, an investigation by the creator of GeekBench revealed a noticeable difference in the performance of iPhones on iOS version 10.2.1 compared to those on the previous version. In his summary, he notes: "I believe (as do others) that Apple introduced a change to limit performance when battery condition decreases past a certain point." Apple confirmed this hypothesis two days later, and stated that the performance decrease was an attempt to "smooth out the instantaneous peaks only when needed to prevent the device from unexpectedly shutting down." This caused backlash from consumers, who claimed they had not been informed of the change nor given the opportunity to replace the batteries.

Shortly afterward, Apple released a statement apologizing for the controversy and offering discounted out-of-warranty battery replacements for customers with an iPhone 6 or later. Still, they faced class-action lawsuits from iPhone owners, who claimed that "if they had known their batteries were to blame for the slowdown, they would have replaced the battery instead of buying a new phone." Apple has since settled litigation in the United States with a payout of $500 million to affected consumers, as well as a separate agreed payout of $113 million to cover legal fees. A class-action lawsuit in the United Kingdom is ongoing.

== History ==
Upon the release of iOS 10.1.1 in late-2016, reports surfaced of battery usage issues with the update. There were also reports of device instability from some users on iPhone 6 and iPhone 6S models, including situations where the device would unexpectedly shut down once its battery capacity reached 30% (Apple confirmed in December 2016 that some iPhone 6S models manufactured in September and October 2015 had suffered from a battery manufacturing defect.

The company stated that this defect was not a safety concern, but that it could diminish capacity, and cause shutdowns to "protect [the device's] electronic components". In regards to other instances of shutdowns, Apple stated that it would include an "additional diagnostics capability" in the next iOS update so that it could "improve algorithms for managing battery performance and shutdown operations" in future versions. With the release of iOS 10.2.1 in February 2017, Apple stated that it had reduced unexpected shutdowns on iPhone 6S by "more than 80%", and by "over 70%" on iPhone 6. Apple also reported that these issues were separate from the aforementioned defects in the 6S.

In December 2017, the developers of the benchmarking tool Geekbench issued a report which showed a pattern of performance degradation on iPhone 6 models upgraded past 10.2.1, and iPhone 7 models upgraded past iOS 11.2. There had been anecdotal evidence in the past that Apple had intentionally degraded the performance of older iPhone models on newer versions of iOS as a form of planned obsolescence, to encourage sales of newer models.

In response to these reports, Apple issued a statement to CNET, confirming that it had implemented software performance controls based on battery health on older iPhone devices, in order to preserve system stability and prevent unexpected shutdowns. The company stated that its goal was to "deliver the best experience for customers, which includes overall performance and prolonging the life of their devices", and explained that "lithium-ion batteries become less capable of supplying peak current demands when in cold conditions, have a low battery charge or as they age over time, which can result in the device unexpectedly shutting down to protect its electronic components".

Soon after, Apple issued a formal apology, admitting that it initially believed that the issues were caused by iOS bugs and "normal, temporary" performance decreases following an update, but that "continued chemical aging" of batteries in older iPhone devices was also a factor. Apple stated that replacing the device's battery would restore full performance, and also announced that it would offer a US$50 discount (from $79 to $29) on battery replacements for iPhone 6 and 6S from January through December 2018, and that it would include more prominent battery health information in later versions of iOS. In January 2019, Apple CEO Tim Cook stated in a shareholder letter that over 11 million battery replacements had been made under the discount program. The company stated that it had never, nor would ever "do anything to intentionally shorten the life of any Apple product, or degrade the user experience to drive customer upgrades."

iOS 11.3 added the promised battery health information, and also allows these performance controls to be disabled.

Beginning with the iPhone 11, Apple introduced a new performance management system intended to "reduce performance impacts from battery aging". Unlike the previous system, this is always active in response to the battery's current capabilities, and there is no "peak performance" state.

== Reception ==
USA Today columnist Jefferson Graham felt that Apple should have made the battery replacements be free, arguing that it "would go a long way towards erasing widespread suspicion that Apple purposely tries to make its older products obsolete in order to coax consumers into buying new ones."

As of January 2018, 32 class action lawsuits had been filed against Apple over this issue. A Chicago lawyer who proposed a $5 million class-action considered the battery discount "an insult to loyal customers who consistently and with much fanfare have flocked to Apple stores worldwide to purchase every version of the iPhone."

In January 2019, Apple CEO Tim Cook stated that the company had cut its earnings projections due to "fewer iPhone upgrades than we had anticipated", as well as lower-than-anticipated revenue in markets such as China.

On 7 February 2020, French consumer authorities fined Apple €25 million following a formal investigation into the decision. On 28 February 2020, Apple agreed to a $500 million settlement in a California court, under which it plans to pay at least $25 to all U.S. residents who had purchased an iPhone 6, 6 Plus, 6S, 6S Plus, SE, 7 or 7 Plus device.

A separate investigation from 34 states and the District of Columbia also looked into the battery practice. The investigation concluded in November 2020 with Apple and the states agreeing for Apple to pay a US$113 million fine related to throttling performance on the devices, and for Apple to issue documents to be transparent about how it throttles performance.

In January 2024, a class action lawsuit ordered Apple to pay Canadian iPhone users up to $14.4 million CAD to anyone who owned an iPhone 6, iPhone 6s, iPhone SE (1st generation) or iPhone 7 and upgraded to iOS 10.2.1 between 21 December 2017. Apple was accused of slowing down older iPhones using software updates to encourage consumers to buy newer and more expensive iPhones. However, Apple denies any wrongdoing and claims the updates were to prevent shutdowns due to aging batteries.

== See also ==
- Antennagate
- Planned obsolescence
- Durapolist
- Vendor lock-in
- Criticism of Apple Inc.
- Bendgate
