= Apple motion coprocessors =

Series of motion coprocessors by Apple

Apple M-series coprocessors
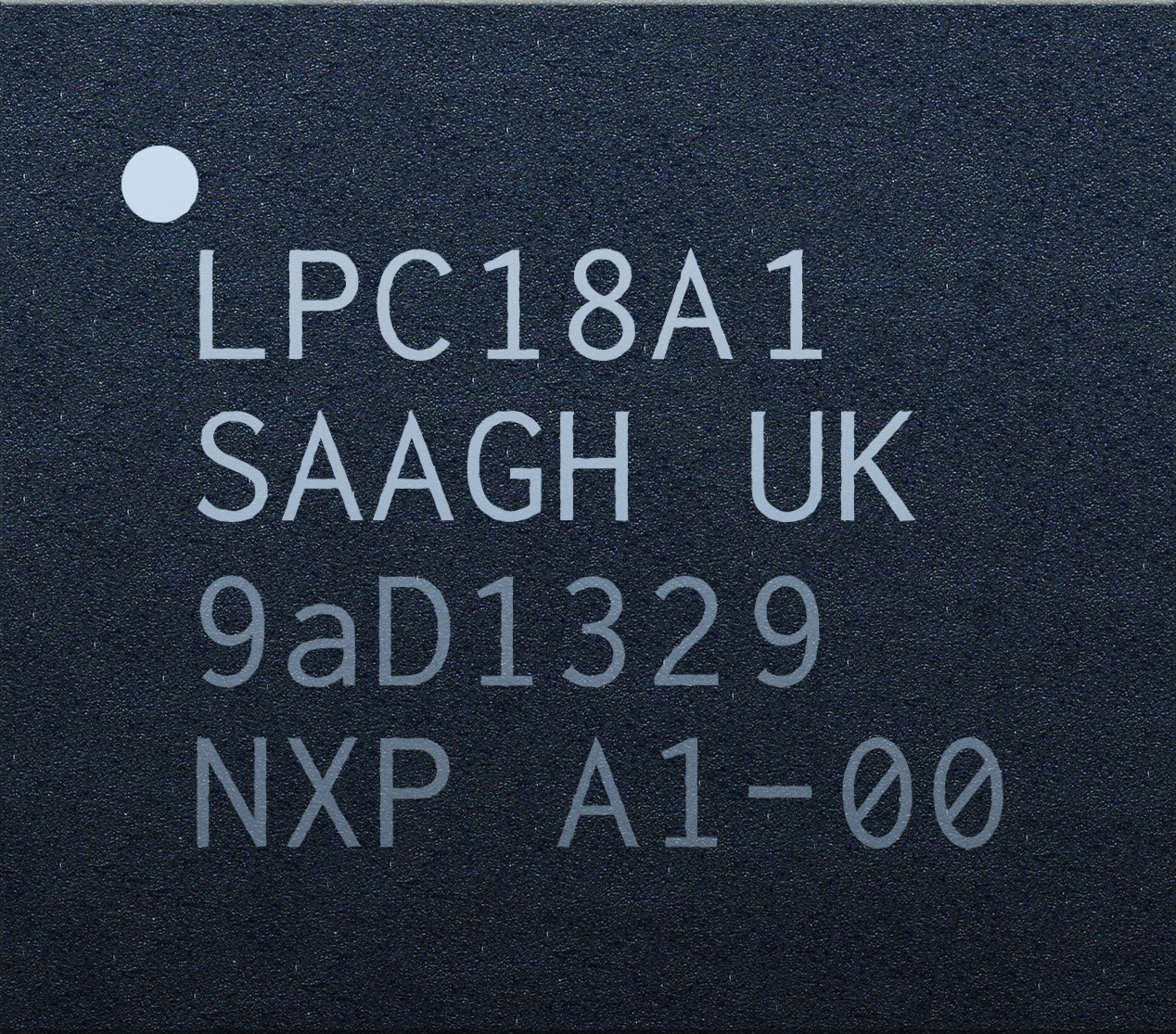
- The NXP LPC18A1, also known as the M7 motion coprocessor

General information
- Launched: September 2013
- Designed by: M7, M8: NXP Semiconductors
- Common manufacturer: M7, M8: NXP Semiconductors TSMC (under contract) Samsung (under contract) Apple Inc. (licensee)
- Product code: M7: LPC18A1; M8: LPC18B1

Performance
- Max. CPU clock rate: 150 MHz

Physical specifications
- Cores: 1

Architecture and classification
- Technology node: 90 nm
- Microarchitecture: Cortex-M3
- Instruction set: ARMv7-M

The Apple M-series coprocessors are motion coprocessors used by Apple Inc. in their mobile devices. First released in 2013, their function is to collect sensor data from integrated accelerometers, gyroscopes and compasses and offload the collecting and processing of sensor data from the main central processing unit (CPU).

The first coprocessor of the series is the M7 (codename Oscar), which was introduced in September 2013 as part of the iPhone 5S. Chipworks found that the M7 most likely is a NXP LPC1800 based microcontroller called LPC18A1. It uses an ARM Cortex-M3 core with a customised packaging and naming scheme indicating that it is for an Apple customized part. The updated version M8 was introduced in September 2014 with the iPhone 6 and also processes data from the barometer that is included in the iPhone 6 and iPad Air 2. iFixit have identified the M8 in the iPhone 6 to be an NXP device with a very similar name, the LPC18B1.

The later coprocessors are embedded into the A-series SoCs. September 2015 brought the M9 motion coprocessor embedded within the A9 chip found in the iPhone 6S, iPhone 6S Plus, first-generation iPhone SE and within the A9X chip found in the first-generation iPad Pro. The iPhone 7, iPhone 7 Plus, second-generation iPad Pro feature the M10 motion coprocessor, embedded within the A10 Fusion and the A10X Fusion chips. Apple included the M11 in the iPhone 8, 8 Plus and iPhone X, embedded within the A11 Bionic SoC.

Starting with the A12 Bionic SoC, Apple has stopped distinguishing the motion coprocessor from the rest of the SoC, and has abandoned the corresponding M-series nomenclature. The M-series nomenclature was reintroduced in 2020 for ARM-based SoCs used in Mac computers and iPad tablets (starting from the 5th generation iPad Pro).

== Usage ==
The Apple M-series coprocessors collect, process, and store sensor data even if the device is asleep, and applications can retrieve data when the device is powered up again. This reduces power draw of the device and saves battery life. In addition to servicing the accelerometer, gyroscope, compass, and in M8 and later coprocessors, barometer, the M9 coprocessor can recognize Siri voice commands from the built in microphones of the device.

The M-series motion coprocessors are accessible to applications through the Core Motion API introduced in iOS 7, so they do, for example, allow fitness apps that track physical activity and access data from the M processors without constantly engaging the main application processor. They enable applications to be aware of what type of movement the user is experiencing, such as driving, walking, running, or sleeping. Another application could be the ability to do indoor tracking and mapping. In iOS 10, the motion coprocessor is used to implement raise-to-wake functionality, reducing idle energy usage.

== Products ==
Coprocessor	Processor	Launched	Discontinued	iPhone	iPad	Other	Ref
Apple M7 (LPC18A1)	Apple A7	September 20, 2013	March 21, 2017	iPhone 5S	iPad Air iPad mini 2 iPad mini 3	(none)	
Apple M8 (LPC18B1)	Apple A8	September 9, 2014	May 28, 2019	iPhone 6 iPhone 6 Plus	iPad Mini 4	iPod Touch (6th generation)	
Apple M8 (LPC18B1)	Apple A8X	October 16, 2014	March 21, 2017	(none)	iPad Air 2	(none)	
Apple M9	Apple A9	September 9, 2015	September 12, 2018	iPhone 6S iPhone 6S Plus iPhone SE (1st generation)	iPad (5th generation)	(none)	
Apple M9	Apple A9X	September 9, 2015	June 5, 2017	(none)	iPad Pro (1st generation)	(none)	
Apple M10	Apple A10 Fusion	September 7, 2016	May 10, 2022	iPhone 7 iPhone 7 Plus	iPad (6th generation) iPad (7th generation)	iPod Touch (7th generation)	
Apple M10	Apple A10X Fusion	June 13, 2017	April 20, 2021	(none)	iPad Pro (2nd generation)	Apple TV 4K (1st generation)	
Apple M11	Apple A11 Bionic	September 12, 2017	April 15, 2020	iPhone 8 iPhone 8 Plus iPhone X	(none)		

== Gallery ==
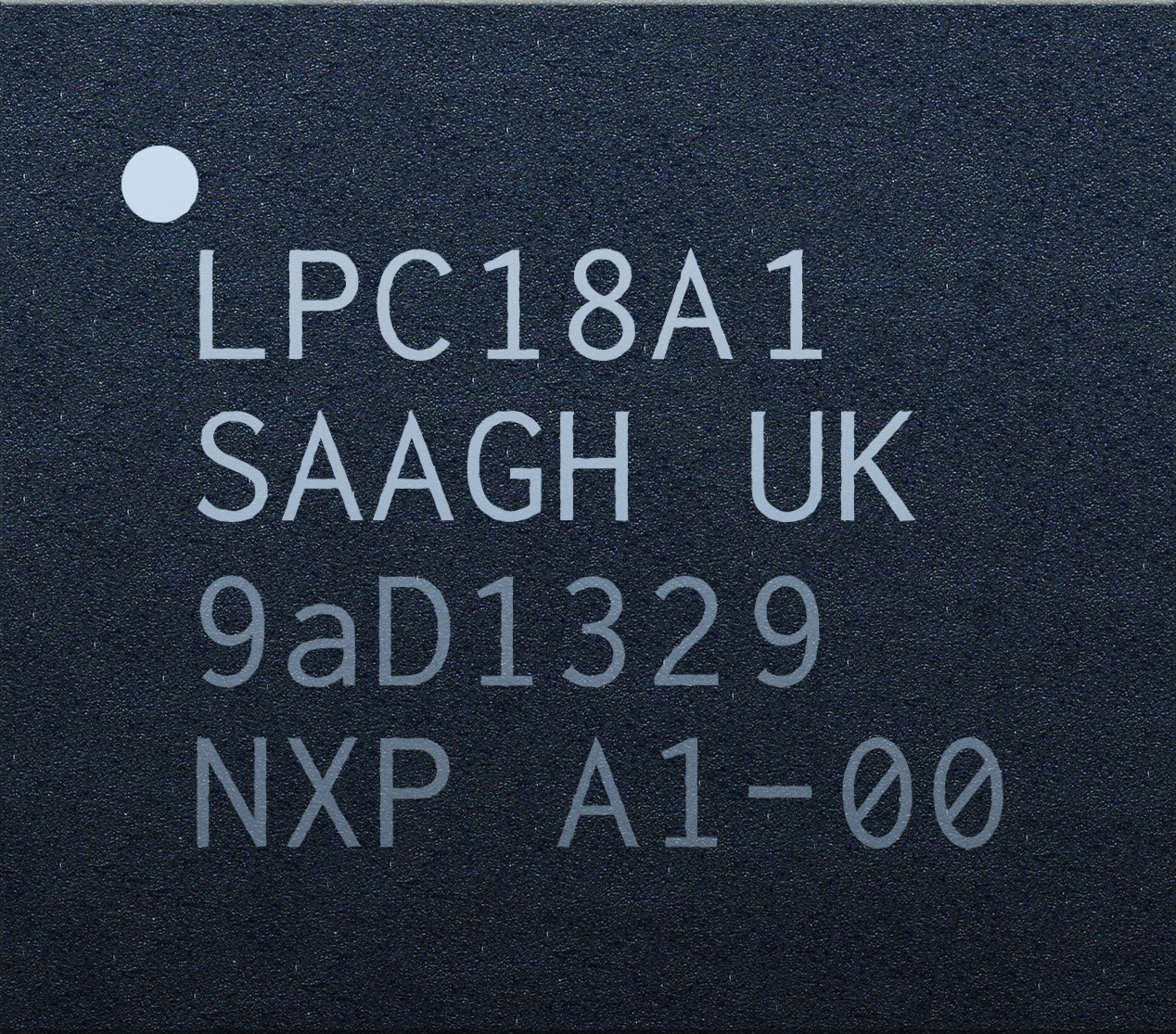
The LPC18A1, also known as the Apple M7. Manufactured week 29 in 2013.

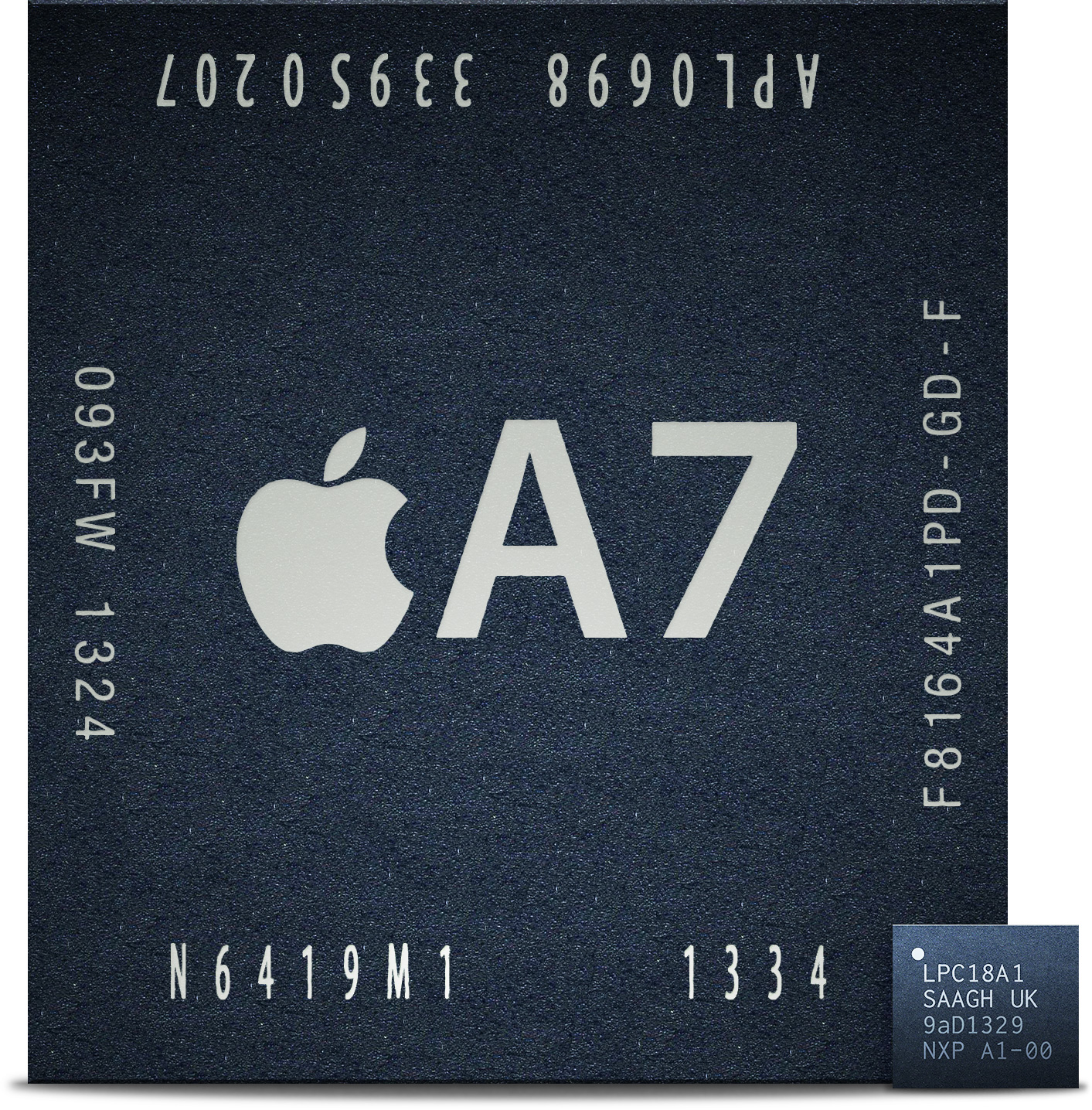
The size difference between the A7 and the smaller LPC18A1

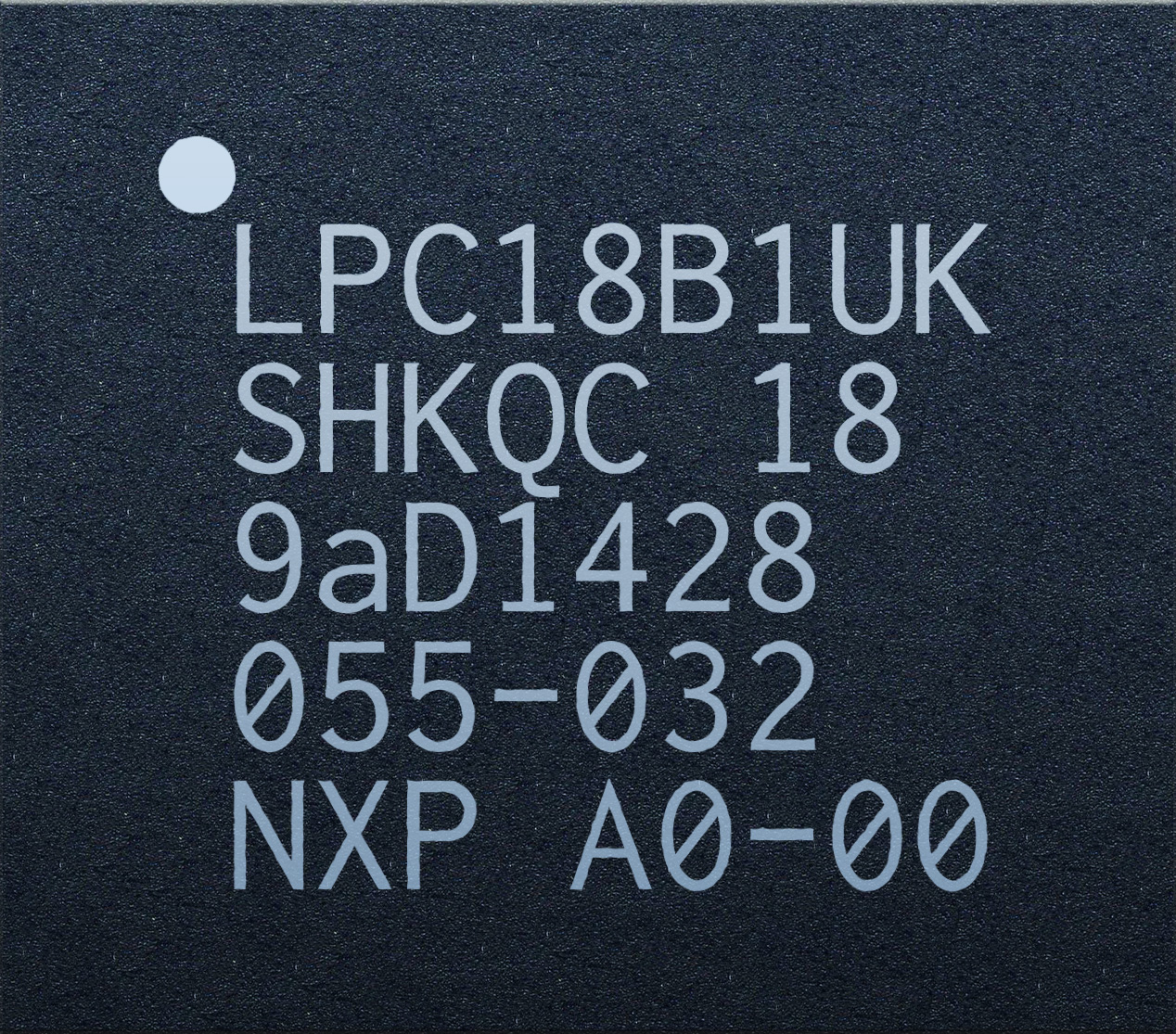
The LPC18B1, also known as the Apple M8. Manufactured week 28 in 2014.

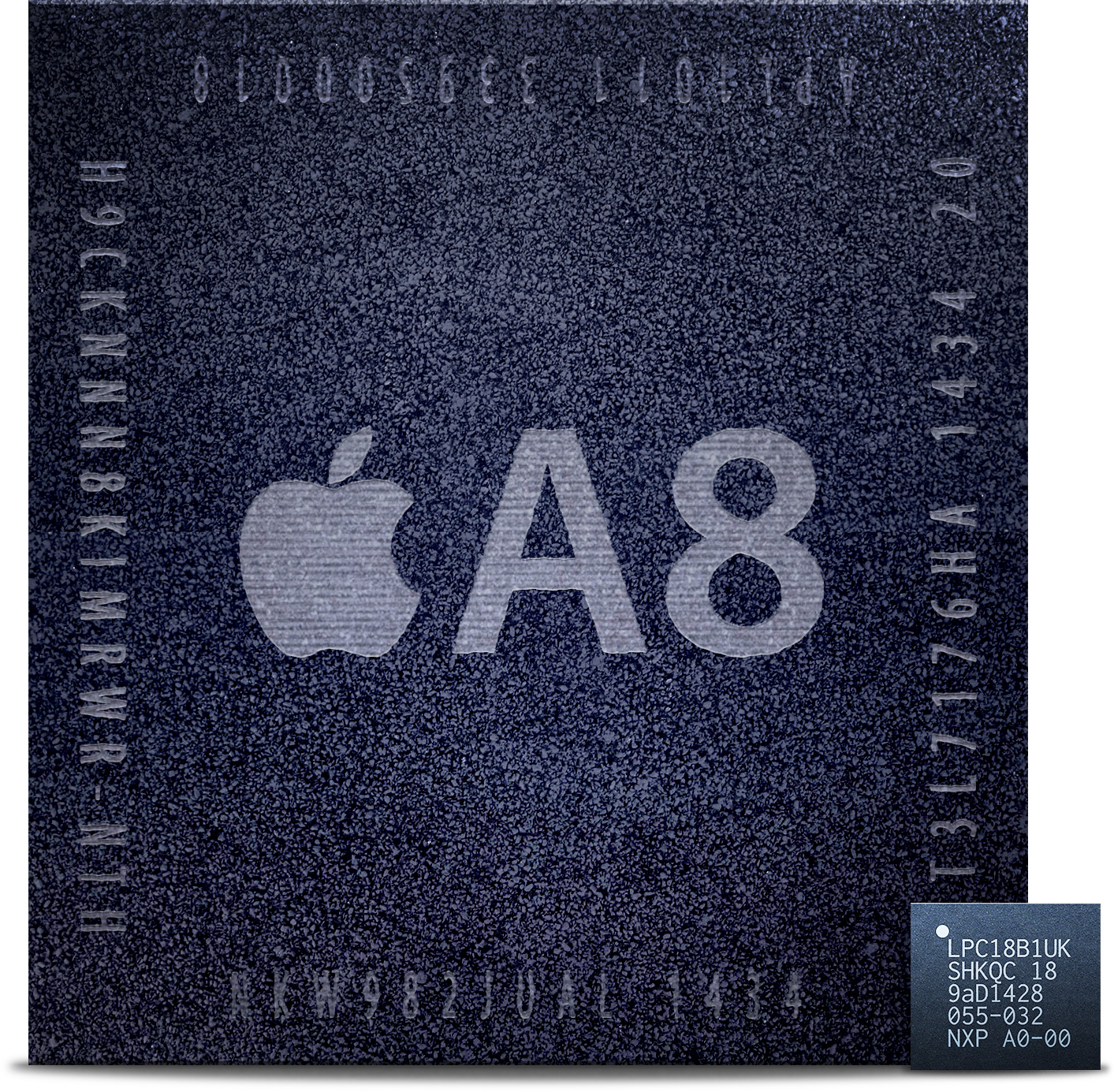
The size difference between the A8 and the smaller LPC18B1

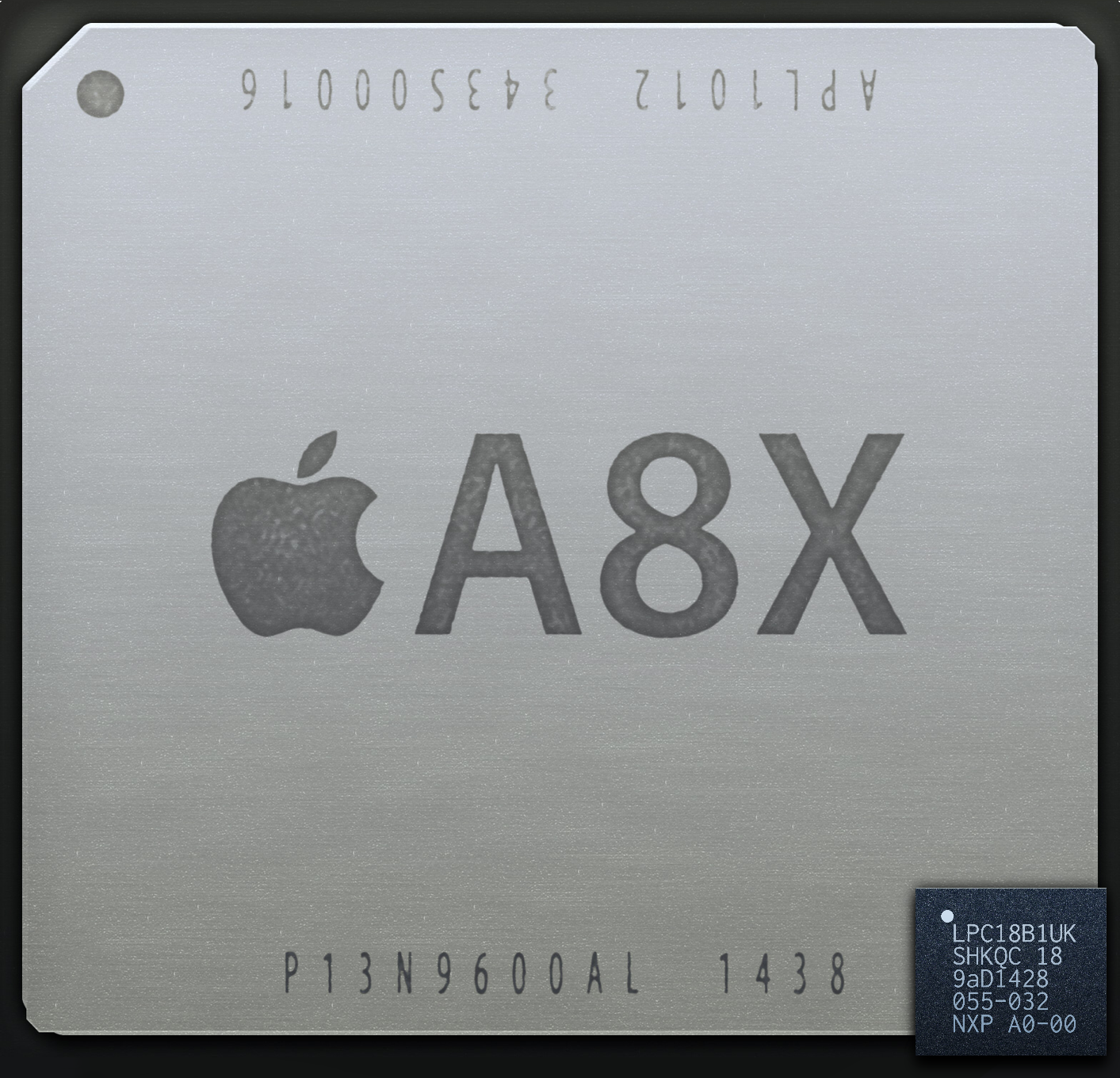
The size difference between the A8X and the smaller LPC18B1

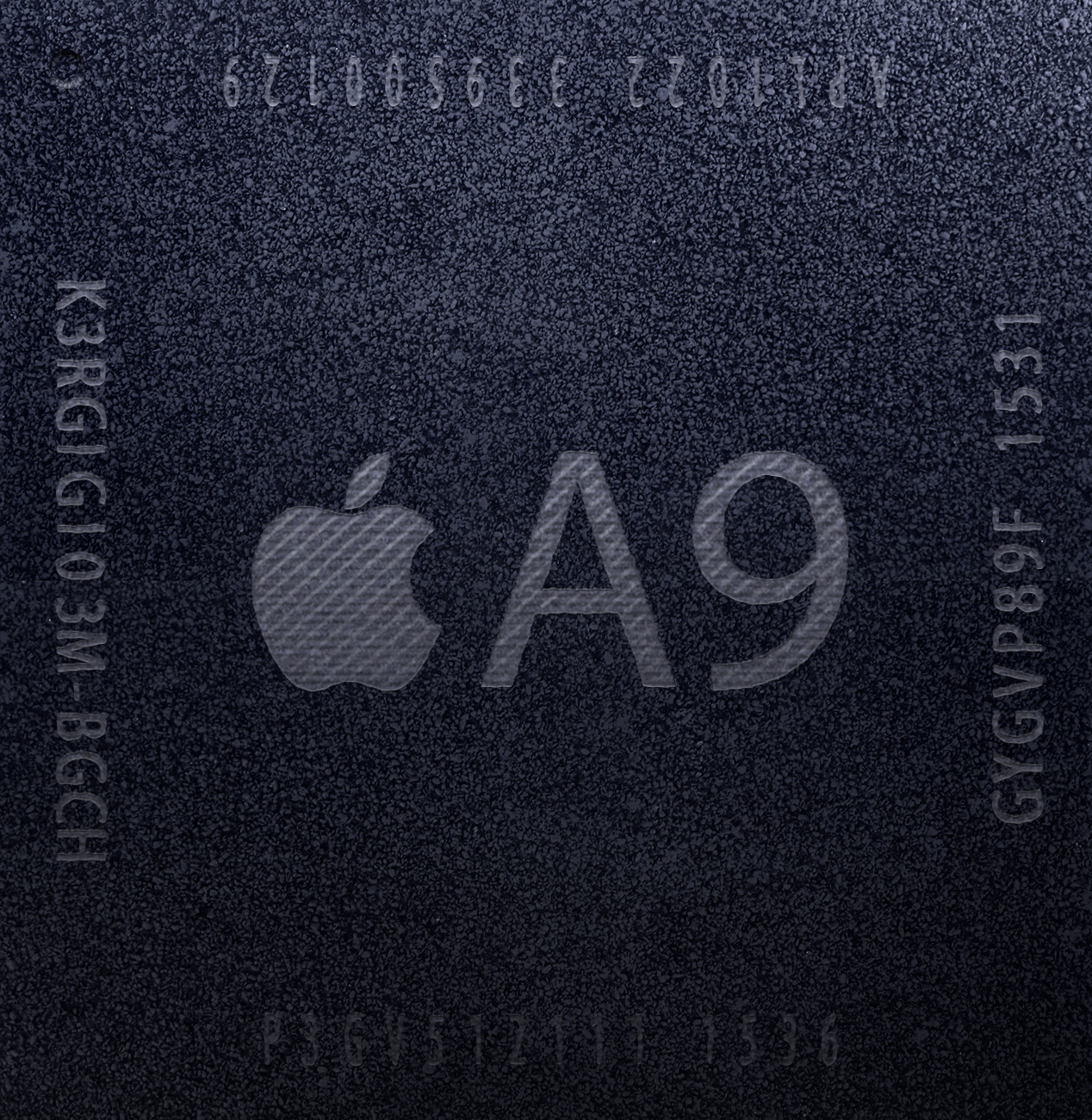
The Apple A9 which has the on-die M9 coprocessor

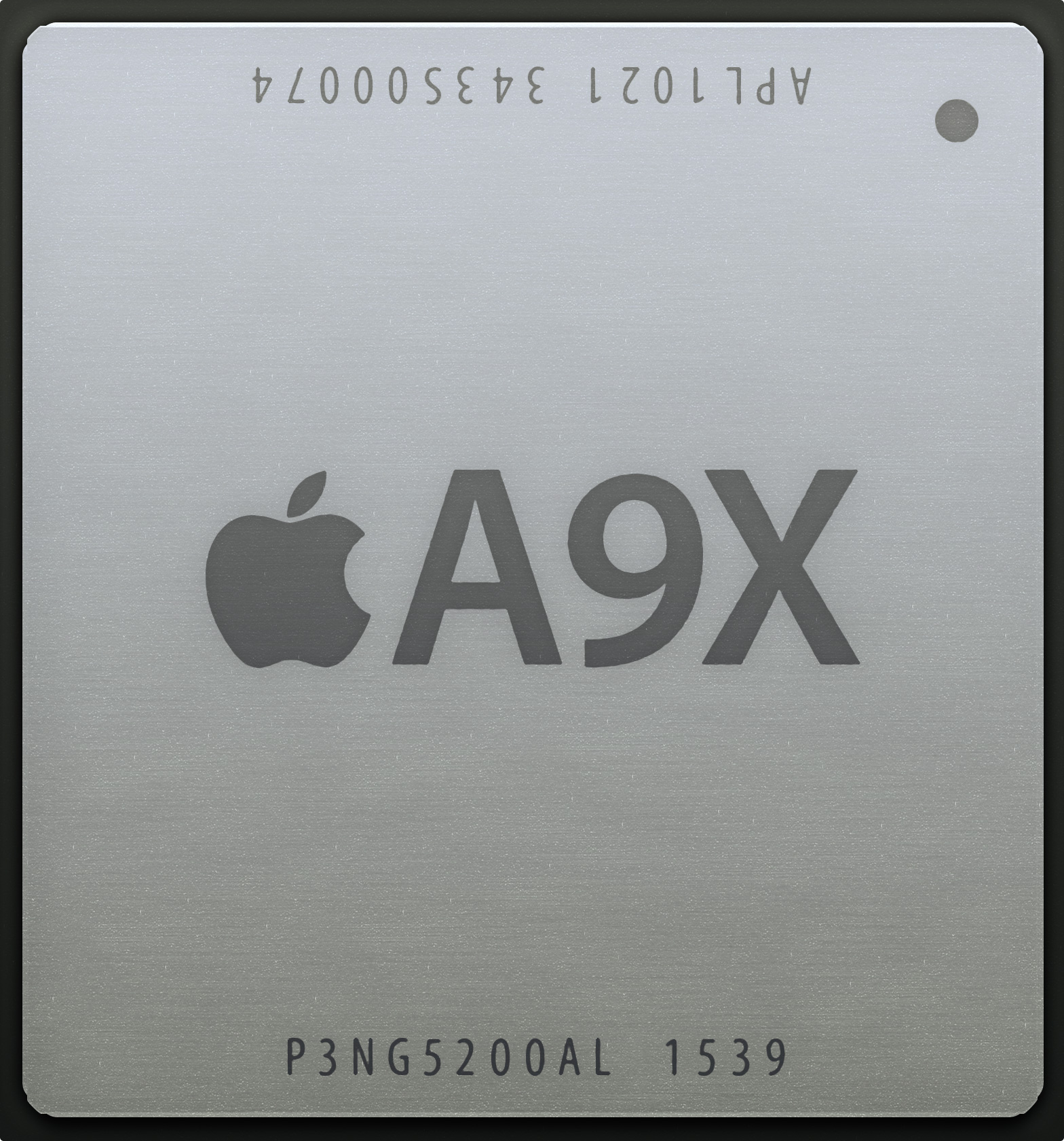
The Apple A9X which has the on-die M9 coprocessor

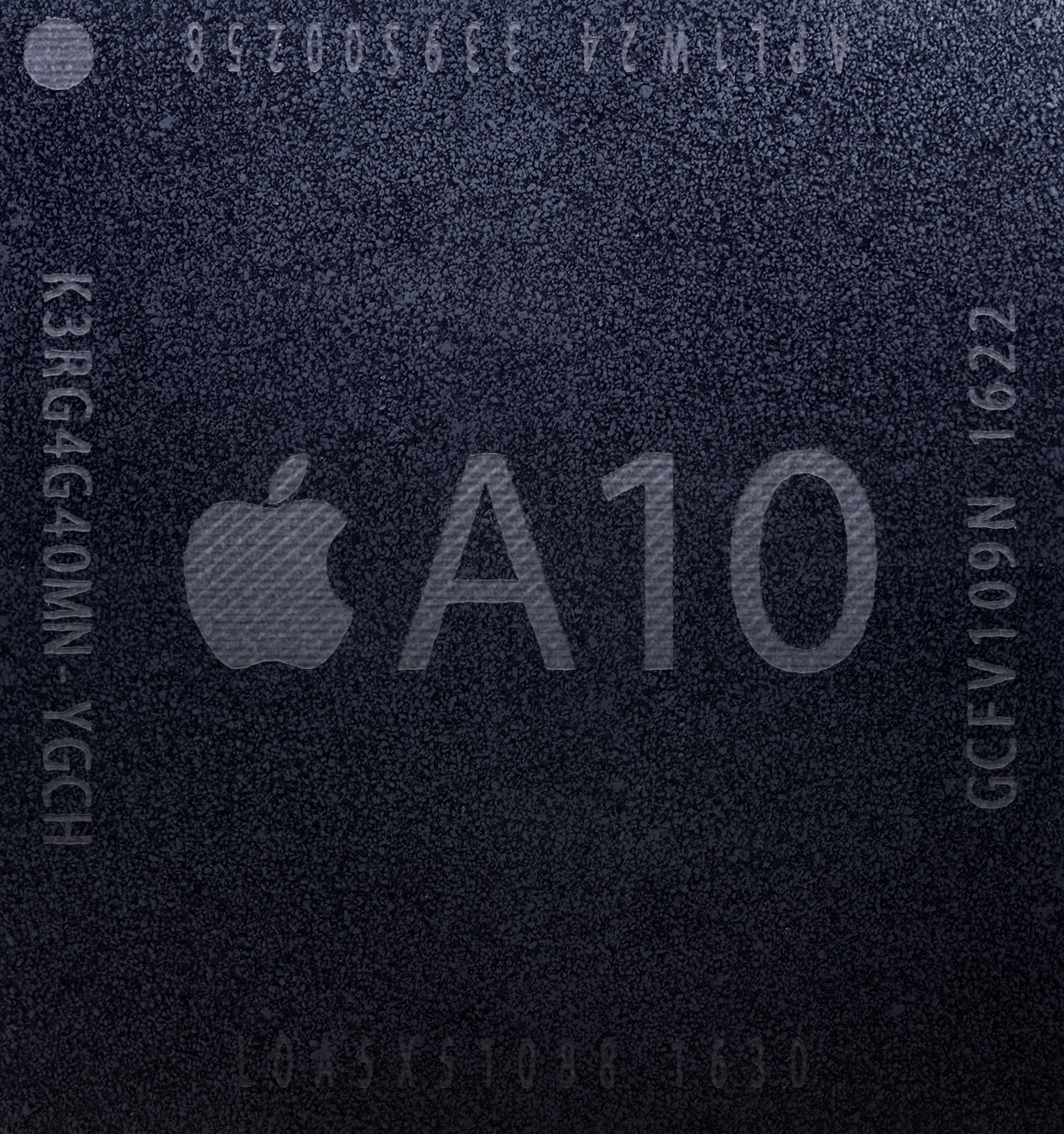
Apple A10 Fusion with on-die M10 coprocessor

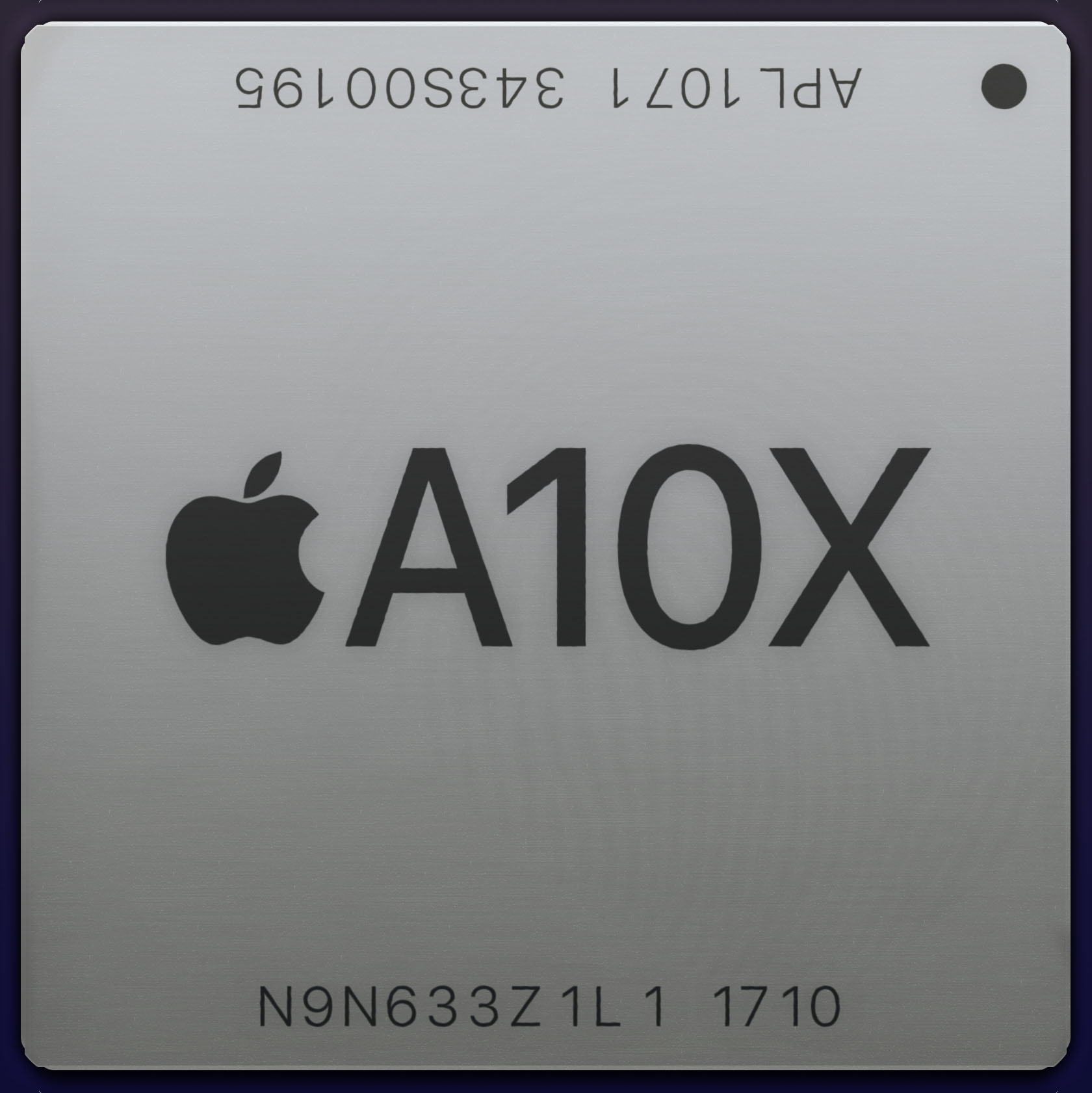
Apple A10X with on-die M10 motion co-processor

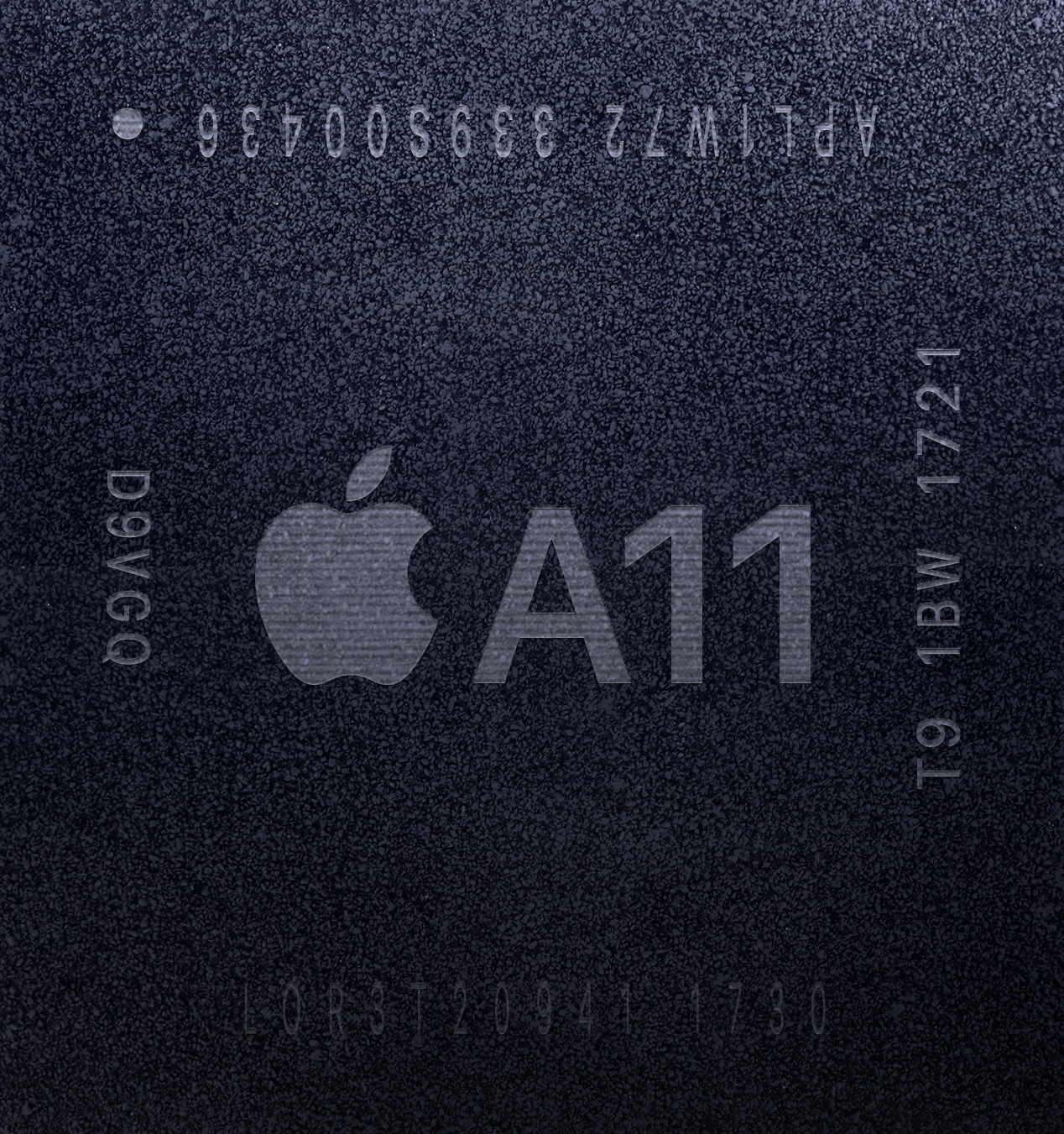
Apple A11 Bionic with on-die M11 motion co-processor

== See also ==
- Apple A series
- Apple A7
- Apple A8
- Apple A8X
- Apple A9
- Apple A9X
- Apple A10 Fusion
- Apple A10X Fusion
- Apple A11 Bionic
