= IPad Pro (2nd generation) =

Tablet computer developed by Apple (2017–2019)

iPad Pro (2nd generation)

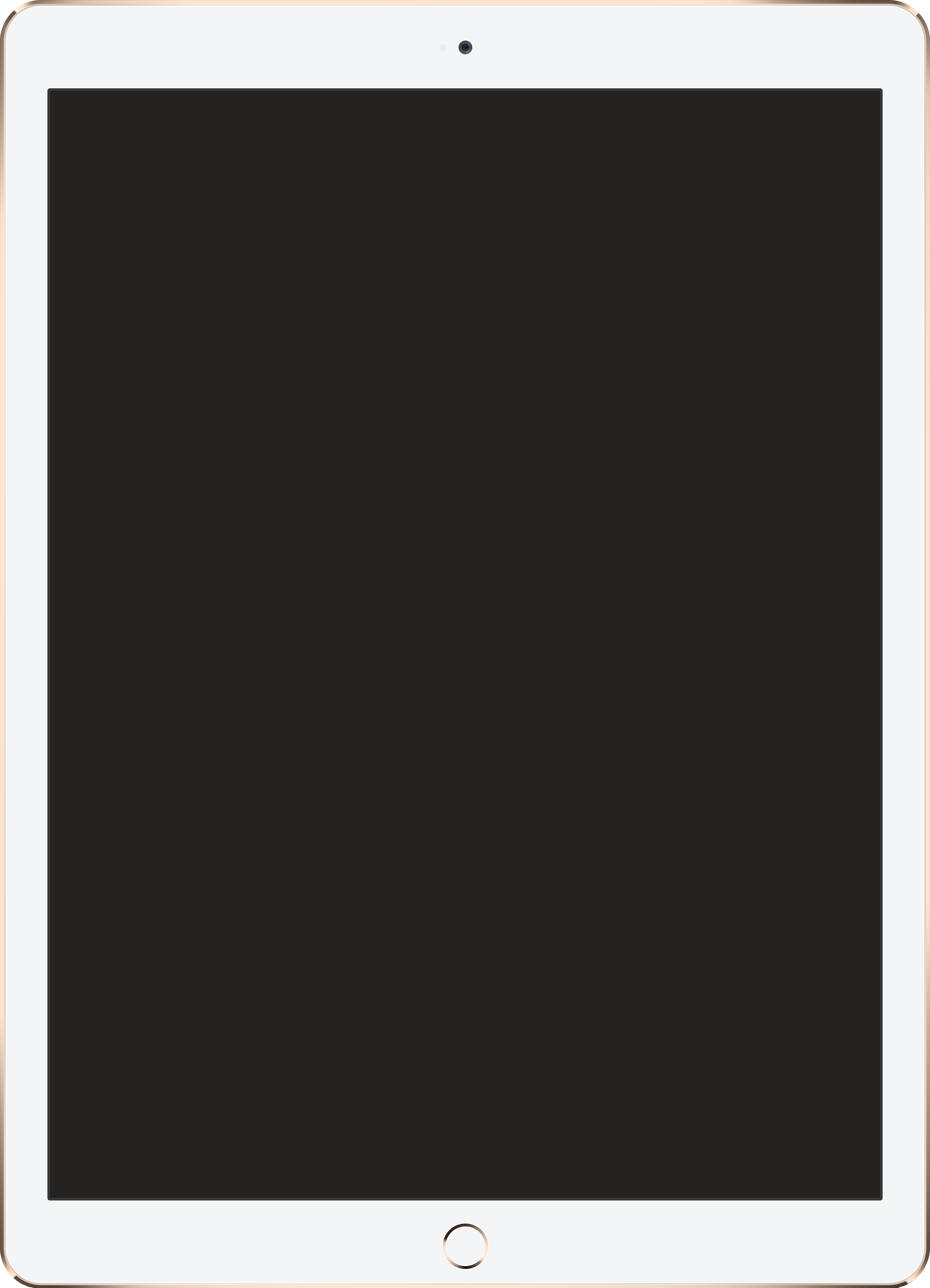
- 12.9" iPad Pro (2nd generation) in Gold
- Developer: Apple Inc.
- Product family: iPad Pro
- Type: Tablet computer
- Generation: 2nd
- Released: June 13, 2017; 9 years ago
- Introductory price: $799
- Discontinued: October 30, 2018; 7 years ago (12.9-inch); March 18, 2019; 7 years ago (10.5-inch)
- Operating system: Original: iOS 10.3.2; Current: iPadOS 17.7.11, released May 11, 2026
- System on a chip: Apple A10X with 64-bit architecture and Apple M10 motion co-processor
- Memory: 4 GB (LPDDR4)
- Storage: 64, 128, 256, or 512 GB flash memory
- Display: 264 PPI IPS panel in 4:3 ratio: 12.9-inch: 2732×2048 px; 10.5-inch: 2224×1668 px
- Graphics: 12-core PowerVR Series 7XT
- Sound: Four speakers, adjusting sound to device orientation
- Camera: 12.9-inch 2G and 10.5-inch: 7 megapixels 1080p front-facing and 12 megapixels 4K rear-facing, Optical & Digital Image Stabilization
- Connectivity: Wi-Fi and Wi-Fi + Cellular: Wi-Fi 802.11 a/b/g/n/ac; dual channel (2.4 GHz and 5 GHz); HT80 with MIMO; Bluetooth 4.2; Wi-Fi + Cellular: GPS & GLONASS
- Power: Built-in rechargeable lithium-ion battery: 12.9-inch 2G: 3.76 V 41 W·h (10,891 mA·h); 10.5-inch: 3.77 V 30.8 W·h (8,134 mA·h)
- Dimensions: 12.9-inch: 305.7 mm (12.04 in) (h); 220.6 mm (8.69 in) (w); 6.9 mm (0.27 in) (d); 10.5-inch: 250.6 mm (9.87 in) (h); 174.1 mm (6.85 in) (w); 6.1 mm (0.24 in) (d) eight =: 12.9-inch Wi-Fi: 677 g (1.493 lb); 12.9-inch Wi-Fi + Cellular: 692 g (1.526 lb); 10.5-inch Wi-Fi: 469 g (1.034 lb); 10.5-inch Wi-Fi + Cellular: 477 g (1.052 lb)
- Predecessor: iPad Pro (1st generation)
- Successor: iPad Pro (3rd generation)
- Related: iPad Air (3rd generation)
- Website: www.apple.com/ipad-pro/ at the Wayback Machine (archived October 28, 2018)

The second generation of iPad Pro is a line of iPad tablet computers developed and marketed by Apple Inc. The iPads, with 12.9 inch and 10.5 inch screens, were both announced on June 5, 2017. Both models are compatible with the first generation of Apple Pencil. Like the first generation, a larger size and stylus compatibility were a point of difference from the rest of Apple's available iPads.

Upgrades from the first-generation iPad Pro include the more powerful A10X Fusion chip, storage capacity up to 512 GB and the larger display of the 10.5 inch model (upgraded from a 9.7 inch model) while the 12.9 inch model was refreshed. Following the 2017 announcement, the first-generation models were discontinued.

The 12.9 inch version was discontinued on October 30, 2018, after the announcement of the 3rd-generation iPad Pro. However, the 10.5 inch version continued in production along with the 11 inch version until March 18, 2019, when the iPad Air (3rd generation) was announced.

Both second generation iPad Pro models supported eight versions of iOS/iPadOS, being iOS 10 through iPadOS 17. At WWDC 2024, it was announced that they would not support iPadOS 18 despite having superior hardware to some models supporting the new update.

== Features ==
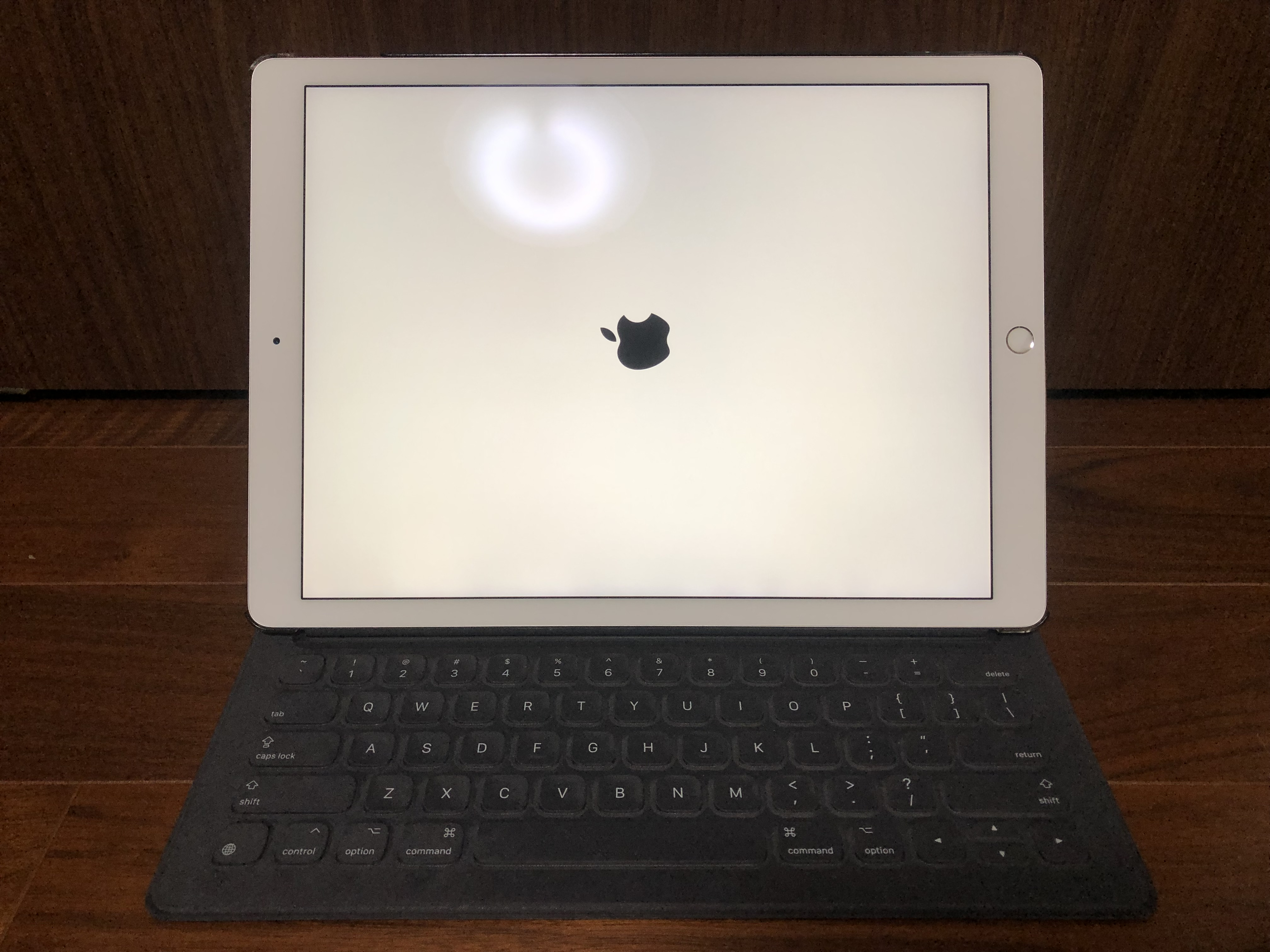
Features of the new iPad Pro include a foldable keyboard.

The second-generation iPad Pro was announced on June 5, 2017, alongside iOS 11 at WWDC 2017. The two models, the 10.5-inch and 12.9-inch, have an upgraded A10X SoC which features a 6-core CPU with a 12-core GPU, Apple's ProMotion display technology which supports HDR10 and Dolby Vision content (with iOS 11 or later) with a 120 Hz refresh rate and their True Tone display is 50 percent brighter than the earlier models; both sizes also have a 12-megapixel rear-facing camera with quad-LED True-Tone flash and a 7-megapixel front-facing camera with Retina Flash. They have USB 3.0 connection speeds using Lightning cables, with USB-C fast-charge support. The second-generation iPad Pro has storage capacities up to 512 GB. The second-generation iPad Pro is the final model to include a home button with Touch ID, with the third-generation model replacing it with gestures for navigation and Face ID replacing Touch ID for authentication purposes. It is also the final iPad Pro model to use the Lightning connector and port, as the iPad Pro (3rd generation) and later uses the USB-C connector and port.

== Reception ==
Max Parker from TrustedReviews and Gareth Beavis from TechRadar both praised the 10.5-inch model's high-quality audio and performance, but did note that it was expensive.

Reviewing the 12.9 inch second-generation iPad Pro, Lauren Goode of The Verge complimented the high quality camera, A10X processor and large screen size, but argued that the device could have been cheaper.

== Hardware issues ==
Reports indicate that the display of the 12.9 inch second-generation iPad Pro has a high propensity of experiencing a "backlight bleed" failure, manifested as brighter halos of light bleeding through one edge of the screen.

The 2nd generation iPad Pro and The 3rd generation iPad Air models can develop a glowing white spot on the display which is located above the home button. This is a problem caused by the display cable underneath pushing against the back of the display, creating a pressure point.

== Timeline ==
Timeline of iPad models
See also: List of Apple products

Source: Apple Newsroom Archive.

== See also ==
- Pen computing
- Graphics tablet
