= IOS 10 =

2016 mobile operating system

iOS 10
- Version of the iOS operating system

- iOS 10 home screen on an iPhone 7. The Videos app was replaced by the TV app in iOS 10.2 in the United States.
- Developer: Apple Inc.
- Working state: No longer supported
- Source model: Closed, with open-source components
- Initial release: September 13, 2016; 10 years ago
- Latest release: 10.3.3 (iPhone 5c and later) (July 19, 2017; 9 years ago); 10.3.4 (iPhone 5 and iPad (4th generation) only) / July 22, 2019; 7 years ago
- Update method: Software Update
- Package manager: App Store
- Supported platforms: iPhone, iPod Touch, iPad
- Kernel type: Hybrid (XNU)
- License: Proprietary software with open-source components
- Preceded by: iOS 9
- Succeeded by: iOS 11
- Official website: iOS 10 – Apple at the Wayback Machine (archived September 12, 2017)
- Tagline: More personal. More powerful. More playful.

Support status
- Obsolete, unsupported as of March 2022

iOS 10 is the tenth major release of the iOS mobile operating system developed by Apple Inc., being the successor to iOS 9. It was announced at the company's Worldwide Developers Conference (WWDC) on June 13, 2016, and was released on September 13, 2016. It was succeeded by iOS 11 on September 19, 2017.

iOS 10 incorporates changes to 3D Touch and the lock screen. There are new features to some apps: Messages has additional emojis and third-party apps can extend functionality in iMessage, Maps has a redesigned interface and additional third-party functions, the Home app manages "HomeKit"-enabled accessories, Photos has algorithmic search and categorization of media known as "Memories", and Siri is compatible with third-party app-specific requests, such as starting workouts apps, sending IMs, using Lyft or Uber or to use payment functions. In iOS 10.3, Apple introduced its new file system, APFS.

Reviews of iOS 10 were positive. Reviewers highlighted the significant updates to iMessage, Siri, Photos, 3D Touch, and the lock screen as welcome changes. The third-party extension support to iMessage meant it was "becoming a platform," although the user interface was criticized for being difficult to understand. Third-party integration in Siri was "great," although the voice assistant was criticized for not having become smarter than before. Reviewers were impressed with the image recognition technology in Photos, although noting it was still a "work in progress" with a higher error rate than the competition. 3D Touch "finally feels useful" and "works in almost every part of the OS." The lock screen was "far more customizable than before," and reviewers enjoyed that notification bubbles could be expanded to see more information without needing to unlock the phone.

A month after release, iOS 10 was installed on 54% of iOS devices, a "slightly slower migration" than for the release of iOS 9, speculated as being caused by an early release issue that may have "put some users off downloading the update." User adoption of iOS 10 steadily increased in the following months, eventually totaling 89% of active devices in September 2017.

iOS 10 is the final version of iOS that supports 32-bit devices, including the iPhone 5, iPhone 5c, and the fourth-generation iPad, as its successor, iOS 11, drops support for those models. iOS 10 is also the final iOS version to support 32-bit applications.

== Overview ==
iOS 10 was introduced at the Apple Worldwide Developers Conference keynote address on June 13, 2016. The first beta release was made available to registered developers following the keynote. Apple released the first public beta release on July 7, 2016.

iOS 10 was officially released on September 13, 2016. The initial release was problematic, with reports of people having their devices in recovery mode after updating.

== System features ==
The Control Center was redesigned and split into three pages: one for general settings, such as quick toggles for airplane mode and orientation lock, one for audio controls and one for controlling HomeKit (internet of things) appliances, if used. 3D Touch capabilities were added to several toggles. Apps showed a widget when their home-screen icon was accessed with 3D Touch. 3D Touch also allows users to prioritize certain app downloads.

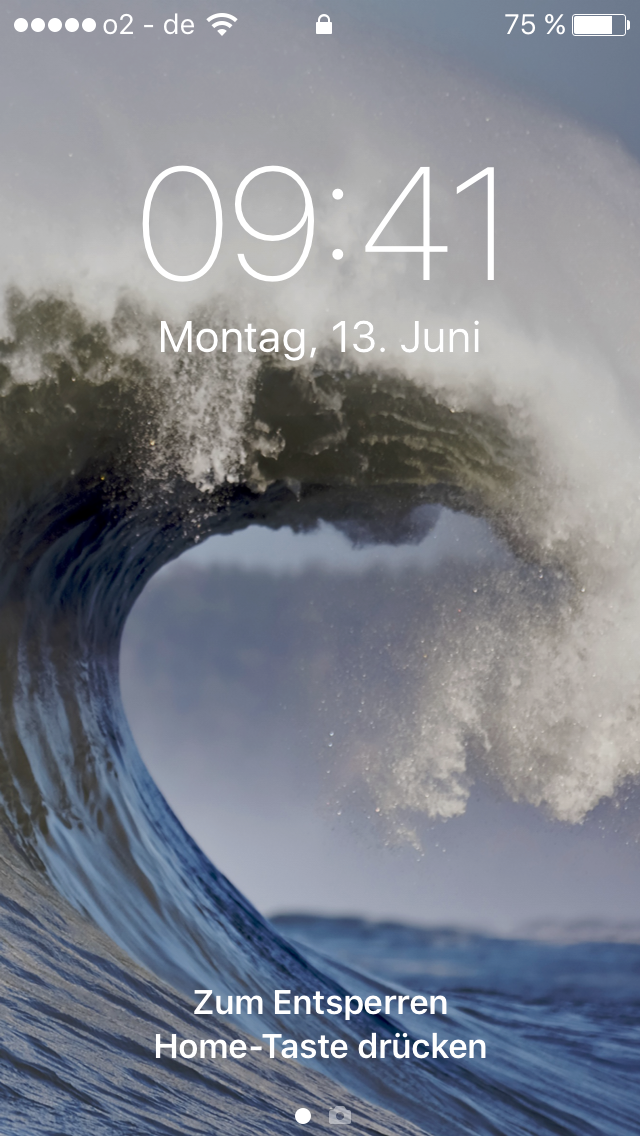
iOS 10 lock screen on an iPhone 5s

Most default apps included with iOS devices can now be hidden from the home screen and 're-downloaded' from the App Store. Upon doing this, the sandbox of the respective app would be removed, which contains user data, settings and caches. The app was also hidden from other places, such as the "Today" view, the Settings app and "Share Sheets", through which the user could interact with the app from within another app. This feature was first hinted at during an interview in September 2015, in which Apple CEO Tim Cook stated that Apple was "looking at" allowing customers to remove unused stock apps.

The update added QuickType virtual keyboards, which, by word-completion capabilities, could predict likely responses to questions and suggest relevant information based on location, calendar availability or contacts. The "Define" feature in previous iOS versions was replaced by "Look Up," and was expanded in utility from just providing definitions to retrieving information from locations, web browsing history, downloaded apps, suggested websites, and more. The QuickType keyboard allowed the user to type in multiple languages, while the ability to change keyboard settings specifically for physical keyboards (such as autocorrect and auto-capitalization) was also added.

The "slide to unlock" mechanism on the lock screen was removed in favor of pressing the home button. Similar to the feature on the Apple Watch, the "Raise to Wake" function, which requires a device with an M9 motion coprocessor or newer, wakes up the device when the user lifts it. The "Today" view of Notification Center was replaced by widgets, accessed by swiping from left to right. On the iPad, widgets could be displayed in a two-column layout.

The Notification Center's "Today" view was removed. Notifications, now larger, could expand to display more information; all unread notifications could be cleared at once using 3D Touch. Apps that need to be updated frequently were able to have notifications that update live. A Spotlight search bar was added to the notification center.

A new Magnifier setting was added which allowed users to triple-click the home button to launch the Camera app with magnification enabled. There were also new "Color Filters" settings to compensate for a user's color blindness. Color Filters options included grayscale, red/green filter for protanopia, green/red filter for deuteranopia, and blue/yellow filter for tritanopia.

Users could turn on Low Quality Image mode in the "messages" application, which saves "your poor iPhone from stuffing itself full of images" based on new animated stickers and GIFs that can be sent in iMessage. The Wi-Fi menu in Settings showed warnings about the security of a network and whether a network lacked Internet connectivity. This was shown to the user as small subtext under the Wi-Fi's network's name.

In iOS 10.2, a "Preserve Settings" feature allowed users to set the Camera app to launch with certain settings by default. Options included launching with the Video or Square mode rather than the Photo mode, preserving the last-used filter, and preserving the capture settings for Live Photos. Music added to Apple Music on one device could now be automatically downloaded to other devices using the "Automatic Downloads" setting. The Settings allowed the user the option to have routes in the Maps app avoid toll roads and/or highways. In iOS 10.3, Settings was updated to feature information relating to a user's Apple ID account in the main menu, and featured a section that allows users to see which old, unmaintained apps won't work in future versions of iOS. Additionally, users could now see a breakdown of their iCloud storage. The user could enable a setting to have Siri announce incoming callers, with options for "Always," "Headphones & Car," "Headphones Only," and "Never".

iOS 10 allowed users to rearrange and remove apps from their CarPlay display, through Settings. In iOS 10.3, Maps on CarPlay added electric vehicle charging stations.

As part of the overall Continuity features introduced in iOS 8, a new Universal Clipboard feature allowed users of Mac personal computers running macOS Sierra and iOS devices running iOS 10 to easily copy material to and from different devices through iCloud. As part of Continuity, a new "Continuity Keyboard" feature allowed users to type text on an iPhone and have the text appear on an Apple TV running tvOS 10, avoiding the Siri Remote for text input.

iOS 10 featured new sound effects for locking the device and for keyboard clicks. In the event that a device detects liquid in the Lightning port, a notice warned the user to disconnect the Lightning cable and allow the port to dry. iOS 10 also allowed TTY calls to be made without any additional hardware. It allows users to find their Apple Watch using Find My iPhone. Spotlight could search the contents of the user's iCloud Drive.

== App features ==
iOS 10 allowed developers to buy advertisement spots in the App Store when users search for content. It also brought back the "Categories" section, which replaced the "Explore" section introduced in iOS 8. In iOS 10.3, developers gained the ability to respond to user reviews, and "Helpful" and "Not Helpful" review labels appeared.

Users could now change what day of the week the calendar starts on, as well as alert settings for birthdays and events, and calendar type (Gregorian, Chinese, Hebrew, Islamic). Live Photos could be taken with filters (previously only available for still photos). In iOS 10.1, the iPhone 7 Plus received a new depth of field portrait camera mode, using both the wide-angle and telephoto lenses on the phone to "create shallow depth of field portrait photos with blurred backgrounds".

The analog stopwatch face

The Clock app began to employ a dark theme. A new "Bedtime" feature reminded the user when to go to bed to get the desired amount of sleep. There was also a new stopwatch face, accessed by swiping to the left. The Contacts app in iOS 10 allows users to set default phone numbers and email addresses for contacts who have multiple numbers or addresses. The app also allows the user to add and remove contacts from the Favorite Contacts list.

Home was a new app that allows users to manage appliances compatible with HomeKit, Apple's API for home automation. In the app, users could add compatible HomeKit accessories, such as locks, lights, and thermostats, and then directly control the appliances through the app. A "Scenes" panel allowed many devices to be controlled at once to fit a mood or setting. Geo-fencing activated scheduled sequences following the user's location.

The Mail app allowed users to unsubscribe from mailing lists with an Unsubscribe button. Users could dismiss the message to unsubscribe for a particular mailing list by tapping the "X" at the top right corner, preventing the Mail app from displaying the unsubscribe button for that mailing list again later. Apple added back support for HTML5 video in Mail, which was previously stopped in iOS 8. Mail could filter messages, either by unread/read, or by categories. iOS 10 also changed how email threading works, by placing the oldest email at the top by default. An option in Settings let users revert to the previous threading system with the most recent message on top. Additionally, the new threaded conversations allowed users to tap a message to see a scrollable stream of messages inside the thread.

Apple Maps was redesigned and updated with additional features, including scanning calendar events for locations, learning from a user's typical actions, and a redesigned driving view. A marker could be automatically placed to indicate the user's parked car. The marker could also tell the user when they last parked their car, and a Notes field allowed the user to enter information, such as parking garage number, in the app.

The app began to help users find the nearest gas station, fast-food restaurant or coffee shop, by swiping up from the bottom of the screen. Maps also estimated how long the detour will take. Users can add third-party extensions to the Maps app, which enable additional functionality, such as a restaurant-booking extension can help the user reserve a table from inside the Maps app. Users can now pan and zoom while in navigation mode.

The app displays the current temperature and weather conditions in the bottom right corner. In iOS 10.3, the app also allows the user to see a weather forecast by using 3D Touch on the current temperature. This functionality allows users to see an hour-by-hour breakdown of the area that they are looking at.

=== Messages ===
The Messages app incorporates its own App Store, which lets users download third-party iMessage apps that can be accessed within iMessage conversations. Users can use them to send stickers, play games or send rich content, such as media previews, to recipients. The Messages App Store has three navigation fields: Featured, Categories, and Manage.

The app has been updated to include many visual effects. Chat bubbles, for example, can be sent with a "loud" or "gentle" animation that the recipient sees upon receiving. "Invisible ink" effect obscures the message until the recipient swipes across it. Full-screen effects like balloons, confetti or fireworks can be sent. There is also support for interactions similar to the Apple Watch, such as sending quick sketches and recording and sending the user's heartbeat. In order to use the screen and bubble effects, the Reduce Motion setting needs to be turned off.

Messages now allows users to send handwritten notes. This is done by turning the device to landscape mode for iPhones (landscape or portrait for iPad users) and then tapping the handwriting squiggle. The Messages app automatically saves recently used notes, to make it easier to send them again. A handwritten message can be deleted in the same way an app is deleted; by holding down on the message and pressing Delete. The message can also be saved as a picture file.

New emojis have been added, as well as additional features related to emoji. Emojis appear 3x bigger if messages are sent with up to three emojis and no text, the keyboard can now predict emojis to use, and an emoji replacement feature attempts to match words in messages and replace them with emojis of the same meaning.

Since the Game Center app has been removed, Messages now handles actions such as inviting friends to a game.

Read receipts can now be turned on or off for individual contacts rather than for all contacts.

Tapbacks have been added, allowing users to react to messages with love, like, dislike, laugh, emphasize, or question.

=== Music ===
The Music app has been redesigned, with an emphasis placed on usability. The "For You" section has been reorganized, with a playlist offering daily music recommendations. The "New" tab has been renamed "Browse". A new tab for music that has been downloaded called "Downloaded Music" has been added.

Lyrics are viewable for songs in-app in iOS 10. The "Search" tab includes recent and trending searches. An "Optimized Storage" option removes downloaded music that the user hasn't played in a while.

=== News ===
The News app, taking cues from the Music layout, has been redesigned to incorporate bold headings and a newspaper-esque layout in the redesigned "For You" tab. News also features support for subscriptions and provides notifications for breaking news.

=== Notes ===
Notes now has a collaboration feature. This allows users to share a note and collaborate with other users, who can add and remove text from a note. Users tap a "round yellow badge with a person and a plus sign" and can then send invitations through text, email, or by link.

=== Photos ===
Apple added deep learning capabilities for sorting and searching in the Photos app.

A new "Memories" feature can automatically recognize and compile related photos and create short, shareable music videos. Local facial recognition functionality was added to bundle together pictures of certain people.

iOS 10 allows users to add doodles and text on a photo, using a new "Markup" feature. If the user edits a Live Photo using Markup, the image will be turned into a still image.

Live Photos can now be edited by the Photos app. This allows users to trim the clip, change the still frame, add a filter and add digital image stabilization to the Live Photo so it is "buttery smooth".

The app also has an upgraded auto-enhance feature and adds a "Brilliance" slider.

=== Phone ===
The Phone app can transcribe received visual voicemails.

Siri can announce the name and phone number of incoming calls. The system can mark suspected spam callers on the call screen upon incoming calls.

Contacts can be enabled for "Emergency Bypass", in which the phone will always make sounds and vibrations when receiving notifications from the chosen contacts, even during Do Not Disturb mode.

In the Favorites screen, users can customize what action each favorited contact will enable from a click, including call, FaceTime, SMS, or email.

Users can save voicemails through AirDrop, iMessage, iCloud Drive, and other apps through a share menu.

=== Safari ===
Apple Pay is now available through the Safari app.

There is no limit to how many tabs users can have open at the same time.

On supported iPads, Safari has a unique "Split View" for viewing two Safari browser tabs in 50/50 mode next to each other.

Users can also search for keywords in specific tabs, close all tabs with a single click, and reopen recently closed tabs by long-pressing on the plus icon. Users can also search for items in the Bookmarks and Reading List.

=== TV ===
Included in the iOS 10.2 update is a "TV" app. The app, which is only available in the United States, offers a simple, unified experience of content from different video apps, as long as each service supports the feature. The new app replaces the Videos app found in previous iOS versions.

== Developer APIs ==
iOS 10 gives third-party developers access to APIs to three major iOS system apps and services: Siri, iMessage, and Maps. Developers can:

- Turn certain activities into Siri voice commands, allowing users to speak voice queries into the Siri personal assistant and Siri returning results from the respective apps. Apps that can integrate with Siri are limited to: sending messages, starting calls, sending and requesting payments, search for photos and videos, ordering taxicab or ride-sharing services, and managing workouts.
- Add dedicated apps to the iMessage App Store, that lets users add unique sticker packs, share rich content, or interact with certain app functions entirely within an iMessage conversation.
- Add extensions to Apple Maps, so apps with specific functionality useful in a map, such as a restaurant-booking app, can integrate with the mapping service to handle app functionality directly in the Maps app.

iOS 10 allows third-party camera apps to capture RAW image format pictures. Support for shooting photos in Adobe's DNG RAW format is limited to devices with at least a 12MP camera and a third-party app that supports it, as Apple did not enable the feature in the native Camera app.

iOS 10 allows VoIP apps to have the same functionality and interface as the Phone and FaceTime apps have, through the use of a CallKit API.

== Removed functionality ==
Native support for the VPN protocol PPTP was removed. Apple recommends alternatives that it considers to be more secure.

The options to group notifications by app in Notification Center and customize the order of notifications were removed.

The Game Center app has been removed, as is the case on macOS Sierra. The service was not discontinued, and remained accessible through games.

"Slide to unlock" was removed. It was replaced with "Press Home to unlock".

== Reception ==
In his review, The Verge's Dieter Bohn wrote that the new features introduced in iOS 10 are "an evolution of some of the design and interaction ideas that Apple has been working on for a couple of years". He wrote that iMessage is "becoming a platform all its own", and although he liked that extensions mean access to information from apps without needing to open the respective apps, he wrote that new iMessage interface is difficult to understand and that the use of "third-party apps, stickers, crazy confetti effects, and emoji all over the place" is a "nightmare", although finishing with "Or maybe that's a wonderland, not a nightmare. Your call." Regarding third-party support in Siri, he called it "great", while noting the limited class of apps ("calls, messaging, payments, photos, ride-sharing apps, some CarPlay systems, and workouts"), and that sometimes a button press was required to complete the process. Beyond app integrations, he criticized Siri, writing "Siri doesn't seem to have gotten a whole lot smarter than you remember". Bohn enjoyed the new machine learning technology present in the Photos app, writing that he was "impressed" by Apple's image recognition technology, which he noted is done locally on the device, but did criticize the error rate, where he compares the technology to Google Photos as a step ahead. Bohn liked the new designs for the Music and Maps apps, saying both the redesigns were "for the better". Bohn particularly enjoyed the new lock screen, where he highlighted that notification bubbles can be 3D Touch-ed to access more information, all without needing to unlock the phone. Other small bits of new features he liked included "deletable" apps, upgraded "widgets" when 3D Touch-ing a home screen icon, and breaking news notifications in Apple News. Overall, Bohn referred to iOS 10 as "Still a walled garden, but with more doors".

Engadget's Devindra Hardawar wrote that iOS 10 is Apple "basically polishing a pearl." Hardawar noted that the major changes in the release focus on features rather than the visual interface. He wrote that the lock screen is now "far more customizable than before." He praised the new features added to 3D Touch, writing that it "finally feels useful," where he likes that "3D Touch works in almost every part of the OS." In regard to iMessage, he wrote that it has new features that are "particularly useful", including "Invisible ink" that obscures text in a conversation when others might be looking, but criticized the user interface, writing that it "needs some work". The "Memories" feature in the new Photos app "usually turned out well", but wrote that "they're still clearly a work in progress." Hardawar praised the new Apple Music app, but added that "really, anything is better than the last iteration." He also liked lyrics support. He wrote that Siri's third-party support was "actually starting to get useful," but did run into accuracy issues. He finished by writing that although iOS 10 does add features seen in Google's Android operating system before, the mobile industry is "shamelessly getting "inspired" by the competition". His summary states that "iOS 10 is a collection of useful changes to an already solid OS".

In October 2016, a month after its initial release, 54% of iOS devices were running iOS 10, a "slightly slower migration" than for the release of iOS 9 in the preceding year, a result speculated by MacRumors's Tim Hardwick as being caused by an early release issue that disabled some devices and may have "put some [users] off downloading the update." User adoption increased to 76% of active devices in January 2017, 79% in February 2017, 86% in June 2017, 87% in July 2017, and 89% in September 2017 before the release of iOS 11.

== Problems ==
=== Recovery mode issues ===
The initial public release of iOS 10 on September 13, 2016, saw many iPhones and iPads sent into recovery mode, by the over-the-air update, requiring devices to be connected to a Mac or PC with iTunes in order to retry the update or restore the device to factory settings. Apple very shortly after released iOS 10.0.1, and issued an apology.

=== Local backup encryption issue ===
In September 2016, it was discovered that the encryption of local iOS backups made with iTunes is weaker for iOS 10 devices than for devices running iOS 9. Russian software firm ElcomSoft discovered that the iOS 10 backup process skips several security checks, making it "approximately 2,500 times" faster to try passwords, enabling 6 million password tries per second compared to the 2,400 password tries per second for the same process ElcomSoft has used on iOS 9. The firm stated that the impact is "severe". Apple acknowledged the problem, said it planned to issue a security update, but also stated that iCloud backups were not affected. The iOS 10.1 update subsequently fixed the issue.

=== Battery shutdowns and throttling ===
Some iOS 10.1.1 users reported that their devices were prone to unexpectedly shutting down at or around 30% battery charge (with one user describing the battery percentage as dropping unexpectedly from 30% to 1% before doing so, but still registering as 30% when plugging it in to charge it). Apple began the process of diagnosing this bug in iOS 10.2, and stated following the release of iOS 10.2.1 that it had reduced the occurrence of these shutdowns by "more than 80%" on iPhone 6S models and "over 70%" on iPhone 6 models. It also became possible to reboot the device after an unexpected shutdown without plugging it into power.

In December 2017, speculation emerged that Apple had been intentionally throttling the performance of older iPhone models based on battery health, especially on the iPhone 6S (which, in a separate issue, also had isolated incidents of a battery manufacturing issue that was also causing system instability), after a user benchmark showed a variance in performance after a battery replacement. The developers of Geekbench confirmed that there had been sizable decreases on benchmark scores on iPhone 6 devices running iOS 10.2.1 and later, and iPhone 7 devices since iOS 11.2 and later. These led to concerns that Apple was instituting planned obsolescence policies in order to encourage sales of newer iPhone models, a controversy dubbed Batterygate.

Later that month, Apple admitted that since iOS 10.2.1, it had been implementing performance management techniques on older iPhone models to preserve system stability, especially in situations where their batteries are "less capable of supplying peak current demands," such as cold weather, age, or low charge. Apple stated that these measures were intended to help "deliver the best experience for customers, which includes overall performance and prolonging the life of their devices." The company announced that it would offer a discount on out-of-warranty battery replacements during 2018.

== Supported devices ==
iOS 10 supports devices with an Apple A6 or higher SoC and drops support on Apple A5 and A5X devices, including the iPhone 4s, iPad 2, iPad (3rd generation), iPad Mini (1st generation) and iPod Touch (5th generation). iOS 10 is the first version of iOS to drop support for devices with Lightning. The iPhone 5, 5c, and the iPad (4th generation) have limited support, while all 64-bit devices compatible with iOS 10 are fully supported. It is the last version of iOS to support 32-bit apps and devices with 32-bit processors.

=== iPhone ===
- iPhone 5
- iPhone 5c
- iPhone 5s
- iPhone 6 & 6 Plus
- iPhone 6s & 6s Plus
- iPhone SE (1st generation)
- iPhone 7 & 7 Plus

=== iPod Touch ===
- iPod Touch (6th generation)

=== iPad ===
- iPad (4th generation)
- iPad (5th generation)
- iPad Air
- iPad Air 2
- iPad Mini 2
- iPad Mini 3
- iPad Mini 4
- iPad Pro (12.9-inch 1st generation)
- iPad Pro (12.9-inch 2nd generation)
- iPad Pro (9.7-inch)
- iPad Pro (10.5-inch)

== Version history ==
Version	Build	Codename	Release date	Notes
10.0	14A346	Whitetail	September 13, 2016	Initial release, preinstalled only on iPhone 7 and 7 Plus. No longer available to download due to bugs that sent devices to the recovery mode. Drops support for iPad 2, iPad (3rd generation), iPad mini (1st generation), iPhone 4S and iPod touch (5th generation): Introduces Expressive Messaging, allowing users to add bubble effects to messages; Messages can be handwritten; More apps can now integrate with Siri, including: Messaging apps to send, read back, and search messages; VoIP apps to place phone calls; Photos apps to search for images; Ride services apps to book rides; Payment apps to make payments; Fitness apps to start, pause, and stop workouts; CarPlay apps to control car functions; Maps now has Siri suggestions based on previous behavior; Maps now has the option to avoid tolls and highways; Photos how has face recognition features; Home app is introduced to manage HomeKit accessories; Home can remotely access Apple TV or iPad; The Music app has been redesigned for better ease of access; The For You tab in News has been redesigned; Raise to Wake automatically wakes the screen if iPhone is lifted; 3D Touch is now used more within iOS, such as lock screen notification, widgets, Control Center, and Clear All in Notification Center; New emojis, including gender diverse variations, single-parent family variations, and pride flags; Predictive typing is now more accurate; Voicemails now have auto-generated transcripts; Third-party VoIP apps now display received calls on Lock Screen; Apple Pay is now supported in Safari; Two websites can be viewed at the same time using Split View on iPad; US only: the Health app now records health records and organ donations; Magnifier can now use the camera on iPhone or iPad as a digital magnifying glass; Apple Watch can be remotely located with Find My iPhone
10.0.1	14A403	Whitetail	September 13, 2016	Released shortly after iOS 10.0.: Fixes a bug that sent devices into recovery mode after updating; Fixes a bug that allows applications to disclose kernel memory
10.0.2	14A456	WhitetailAni	September 23, 2016	Fixes an issue that could temporarily prevent headphone audio controls from working; Fixes an issue that caused Photos to unexpectedly close when enabling iCloud Photo Library; Fixes an issue that caused enabling app extensions to fail
10.0.3 (Note: iPhone 7 and iPhone 7 Plus only)	14A551	WhitetailAni	October 17, 2016	Fixes an issue where cellular connectivity could drop on iPhone 7 and iPhone 7 Plus
10.1	14B72; 14B72c	Butler	October 24, 2016	Portrait Mode is added to the iPhone 7 Plus, allowing photos to create a depth effect where the subject is kept sharp but the background is blurred; Fixes a bug where opening the Camera app caused severe visual glitches; Fixes another issue that caused Photos to unexpectedly close when enabling iCloud Photo Library; Maps now has transit support for every major train, subway, ferry, and national bus line, along with local bus systems for Tokyo, Osaka, and Nagoya; Maps displays transit fare comparison; Bubble and full-screen effects can be replayed in Messages; Fixes a bug where contact names were displayed incorrectly in Messages; Fixes a bug where Messages would open to a blank white screen; Fixes a bug where the Weather widget would fail to load properly; Fixes a bug where iCloud backups would fail to restore; Fixes a bug where a signed application may substitute code from another application with the same team ID; Fixes a bug where an application that was originally granted access to Address Book would be able to continue to access Address Book if said access was removed; Fixes a bug where viewing a maliciously crafted JPEG file led to arbitrary code execution; Fixes a bug where an attacker in a privileged network position may be able to simulated a FaceTime call hangup; Fixes a bug where processing a maliciously crafted font led to arbitrary code execution; Fixes a bug where an attacker in a privileged network position may be able to spoof the other caller in a multi-call situation; Fixes a bug that allowed arbitrary code execution with kernel privileges; Fixes multiple bugs that allowed an application to gain arbitrary code execution with root privileges; Fixes a bug where a maliciously crafted archive may be able to overwrite arbitrary files; Fixes multiple bugs where processing maliciously crafted web content may lead to arbitrary code execution
10.1.1	14B100	Butler	October 31, 2016	Fixes an issue where Health data could not be viewed for some users
10.1.1	14B150	Butler	November 9, 2016	Fixes an issue where Health data could not be viewed for some users
10.2	14C92	Corry	December 12, 2016	New TV app for United States, replacing the Videos app introduced in iOS 5; New emojis are added; Improves stabilization and framerate of Live Photos; Adds support for RAW digital cameras; Playlists, albums, and songs can now be sorted in the Library tab; Adds support for BraillePen14 in VoiceOver; Disables speaking of passwords; Fixes a bug where processing of a maliciously crafted audio file led to arbitrary code execution; Fixes a bug where processing of a maliciously crafted MP4 file led to arbitrary code execution; Fixes multiple bugs where processing of a maliciously crafted font file led to arbitrary code execution; Fixes many bug where applications were able to gain arbitrary code execution with kernel privileges; Fixes a bug where a user with an unlocked device may be able to force disable Find My iPhone; Fixes many bugs where a local user may be able to gain root privileges; Fixes a bug where the passcode attempt limit may be bypassed; Fixes many bugs where processing of maliciously crafted web content led to arbitrary code execution
10.2.1	14D27	Dubois	January 23, 2017	Initial release on iPad (5th generation): Improves power management during peak workloads to avoid unexpected shutdowns; Fixes multiple bugs where an application may gain arbitrary code execution with kernel privileges; Fixes a bug where Apple Watch may Unlock with iPhone when not on the user's wrist; Fixes many bugs where processing maliciously crafted web content may lead to arbitrary code execution; Fixes a bug where an activation-locked device may briefly present the home screen
10.3	14E277	Erie	March 27, 2017	Introduction of APFS, Apple's new file system. Upon installation, devices are converted from HFS+ to APFS.; The iCloud account associated with a device is now displayed at the top of Settings. If no iCloud account is associated, a prompt to Sign In will be displayed.; Find My AirPods allows locating of AirPods, and playing a sound to locate them; Siri can display cricket scores from the Indian Premier League and the International Cricket Council; The weather icon in the Maps app includes 3D Touch to show hourly forecasts; CarPlay includes new shortcuts for launching recently used apps; In Settings, when choosing an alphanumeric code with numbers only, passcodes can no longer be shorter than 4 characters in length.; An alert is now displayed to indicate that 32-bit apps need to be updated and will no longer work in iOS 11 and later; Fixes a bug that allowed a local attacker to view the associated Apple ID from Lock Screen; Fixes multiple bugs where processing a maliciously crafted font may lead to denial-of-service, disclosing of kernel memory, unexpected application termination, and arbitrary code execution; Fixes multiple bugs where processing of maliciously crafted web content may lead to arbitrary code execution; Fixes an astonishing number of bugs where processing of maliciously crafted images may lead to arbitrary code execution; Fixes an astonishing number of bugs where applications can gain arbitrary code execution with kernel privileges; Fixes a bug where a third-party phone app may be able to forcefully initiate a phone call; Fixes a bug where web history in Private Browsing was recorded; Fixes a bug that caused address bar spoofing
10.3.1	14E304	Erie	April 3, 2017	Fixes a bug where an attacker in Wi-Fi range can execute arbitrary code in baseband on iPhone 5 or later
10.3.2	14F89; 14F90 (Note: iPad (5th generation) only); 14F91 (Note: iPad mini 4 (Wi-Fi + Cellular) only); 14F8089 (Note: iPad Pro 10.5-inch and iPad Pro 12.9-inch (2nd generation) only)	Franklin	May 15, 2017	Initial release on iPad Pro (10.5-inch) and iPad Pro (12.9-inch) (2nd generation): Fixes multiple bugs that allowed an application to gain kernel privileges; Fixes a bug that allowed an application to execute arbitrary code with root privileges; Fixes many bugs where processing of maliciously crafted data allowed for arbitrary code execution; Fixes multiple bugs where maliciously crafted SQL queries led to arbitrary code execution; Fixes an astonishing number of bugs where processing of maliciously crafted web content led to arbitrary code execution; Fixes a bug that allowed an application to execute unsigned code
10.3.3	14G60	Greensburg	July 19, 2017	Final release supported on iPad (4th generation) Wi-Fi and iPhone 5C: Adds new wallpapers for 12.9-inch iPad Pro; Fixes multiple bugs that allowed an application to execute arbitrary code with kernel privileges; Fixes a bug that caused notifications to show up on Lock Screen if this toggle was disabled; Fixes multiple address bar spoofing bugs; Fixes many bugs where maliciously crafted web content led to arbitrary code execution; Fixes multiple bugs that allowed arbitrary code execution in baseband
Exclusive to iPhone 5 and iPad (4th generation) (Wi-Fi + Cellular)
10.3.4	14G61	Greensburg	July 22, 2019	Final release supported on iPad (4th generation) Wi-Fi + Cellular and iPhone 5: Fixes an issue that would prevent some cellular devices from maintaining an accurate GPS position after November 3, 2019

== See also ==
- macOS Sierra
- watchOS 3
- tvOS 10

Preceded by iOS 9	iOS 10; 2016	Succeeded by iOS 11
