= Apple A10X =

System-on-a-chip designed by Apple Inc.

Apple A10X Fusion
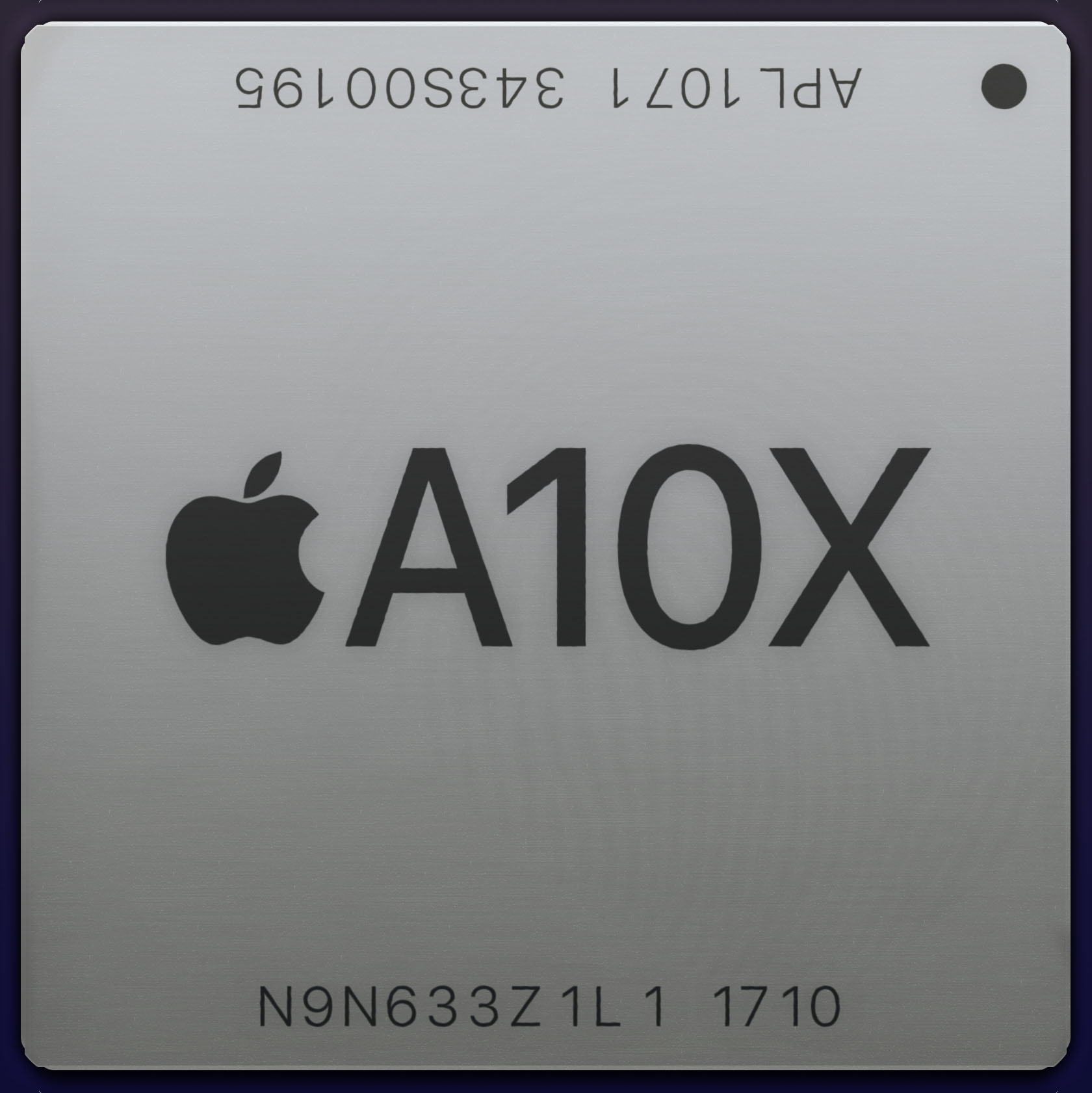

General information
- Launched: June 13, 2017
- Discontinued: April 20, 2021
- Designed by: Apple Inc.
- Common manufacturer: TSMC
- Product code: APL1071
- Max. CPU clock rate: to 2.38 GHz

Physical specifications
- Cores: 6 (ARM big.LITTLE: 3× Hurricane + 3× Zephyr)
- GPU: 12 core

Cache
- L1 cache: Per core: 64 KB instruction + 64 KB data
- L2 cache: 8 MB shared

Architecture and classification
- Application: Mobile
- Technology node: 10FF nm
- Microarchitecture: Hurricane and Zephyr
- Instruction set: ARMv8.1-A: A64, A32, T32

Products, models, variants
- Variant: Apple A10 Fusion, Apple T2

History
- Predecessor: Apple A9X
- Successor: Apple A12X Bionic

The Apple A10X Fusion is a 64-bit ARM-based system on a chip (SoC) designed by Apple Inc., part of the Apple silicon series, and manufactured by TSMC. It first appeared in the 10.5" and second-generation 12.9" iPad Pro which were both announced on June 5, 2017. It was also used in the Apple TV 4K (first generation). The A10X is a variant of the A10 and Apple claims that it has 30 percent faster CPU performance and 40 percent faster GPU performance than its predecessor, the A9X.

iPadOS 17, released in 2023, was the last major software update for the iPad Pro 10.5-inch (2017) and iPad Pro 12.9-inch (2nd generation, 2017). tvOS 26, released in 2025, was the last major software update for the Apple TV 4K (first generation, 2017).

== Design ==
The A10X features an Apple-designed 64-bit 2.38 GHz ARMv8-A six-core CPU, with three high-performance Hurricane cores and three energy-efficient Zephyr cores. The A10X also integrates a twelve-core graphics processing unit (GPU) which appears to be the same Apple customized Imagination PowerVR cores used in the A10. Embedded in the A10X is the M10 motion coprocessor.

Built on TSMC's 10 nm FinFET process with a die size of 96.4mm^{2}, the A10X is 34% smaller than the A9X and was the smallest iPad SoC upon its release. The A10X is the first TSMC 10nm chip to be used by a consumer device.

The A10X is paired with 4 GB of LPDDR4 memory in the second-generation 12.9" iPad Pro and the 10.5" iPad Pro, and 3 GB in the Apple TV 4K.

The A10X has video codec encoding support for H.264. It has decoding support for HEVC, H.264, MPEG-4, and Motion JPEG.

== Products that include the Apple A10X ==
- iPad Pro 10.5-inch (2017)
- iPad Pro 12.9-inch (2nd generation, 2017)
- Apple TV 4K (first generation, 2017)

== See also ==
- Apple silicon, the series of ARM-based system-on-a-chip (SoC) processors designed by Apple.
- Apple A10 Fusion
