= IPhone 7 =

2016 smartphone by Apple

iPhone 7 iPhone 7 Plus

- iPhone 7 in Jet Black
- Developer: Apple
- Manufacturers: Foxconn (on contract); Wistron (on contract) for India market; Pegatron (on contract)
- Type: Smartphone
- Series: iPhone
- First released: September 16, 2016; 10 years ago
- Availability by region: September 16, 2016: Australia; Austria; Belgium; Canada; China; Denmark; Finland; France; Germany; Hong Kong; Ireland; Italy; Japan; Luxembourg; Mexico; Netherlands; New Zealand; Norway; Portugal; Singapore; Spain; Sweden; Switzerland; Taiwan; United Arab Emirates; United Kingdom; United States; September 23, 2016: Andorra; Bahrain; Bosnia and Herzegovina; Bulgaria; Croatia; Cyprus; Czech Republic; Estonia; Greece; Greenland; Guernsey; Hungary; Iceland; Isle of Man; Jersey; Kosovo; Kuwait; Latvia; Liechtenstein; Lithuania; Maldives; Malta; Monaco; Poland; Qatar; Romania; Russia; Saudi Arabia; Slovakia; Slovenia; October 7, 2016: India; October 14, 2016: Macau; Macedonia; Malaysia; Montenegro; South Africa; Turkey; October 15, 2016: Jordan; Oman; October 20, 2016: Israel; Egypt; October 21, 2016: South Korea; Costa Rica; Morocco; Thailand; Mauritius; Madagascar; Uganda; Colombia; October 28, 2016: Cameroon; Botswana; Kenya; Mozambique; Senegal; Moldova; November 4, 2016: Armenia; Mali; Guinea-Bissau; Central African Republic; November 11, 2016: Philippines; Brazil; December 16, 2016: Indonesia
- Discontinued: September 10, 2019; 7 years ago
- Predecessor: iPhone 6s / iPhone 6s Plus
- Successor: iPhone X, iPhone 8 / iPhone 8 Plus
- Compatible networks: GSM, CDMA2000, EV-DO, HSPA+, LTE, LTE Advanced
- Form factor: Slate
- Dimensions: 7: 138.3 × 67.1 × 7.1 mm (5.44 × 2.64 × 0.28 in); 7 Plus: 158.2 × 77.9 × 7.3 mm (6.23 × 3.07 × 0.29 in)
- Weight: 7: 138 g (4.9 oz); 7 Plus: 188 g (6.6 oz)
- Operating system: Original: iOS 10.0.1; Current: iOS 15.8.8, released May 11, 2026
- System-on-chip: Apple A10 Fusion
- Memory: 7: 2 GB LPDDR4 RAM; 7 Plus: 3 GB LPDDR4 RAM
- Storage: 32, 128, or 256 GB NVMe
- Battery: 7: 3.80 V 7.45 W·h (1960 mA·h) Li-ion; 7 Plus: 3.82 V 11.10 W·h (2900 mA·h) Li-ion
- Rear camera: 7: 12 MP 2nd-generation Sony Exmor RS with six-element lens, quad-LED "True Tone" flash, autofocus, IR filter, Burst mode, f/1.8 aperture, 4K video recording at 30 fps or 1080p at 30 or 60 fps, slow-motion video (1080p at 120 fps and 720p at 240 fps), timelapse with stabilization, panorama, face detection, digital image stabilization, optical image stabilization 7 Plus: In addition to above: A telephoto lens with 2× optical zoom / 10× digital zoom, f/2.8 aperture
- Front camera: 7 MP, f/2.2 aperture, burst mode, exposure control, face detection, auto-HDR, auto image stabilisation, Retina flash, 1080p HD video recording
- Display: 7: 4.7 in (120 mm) Retina HD: LED-backlit IPS LCD, 1334×750 px resolution (326 ppi) (1 megapixel); 7 Plus: 5.5 in (140 mm) Retina HD: LED-backlit IPS LCD, 1920×1080 px resolution (401 ppi) (2.1 megapixels); All models: 625 cd/m² max. brightness (typical), with dual-ion exchange-strengthened glass and 3D Touch
- Sound: Stereo speakers
- Connectivity: All models: LTE (bands 1 to 5, 7, 8, 12, 13, 17 to 20, 25 to 30), TD-LTE (bands 38 to 41), UMTS/HSPA+/DC-HSDPA (850, 900, 1700/2100, 1900, 2100 MHz), GSM/EDGE (850, 900, 1800, 1900 MHz), Wi-Fi (802.11 a/b/g/n/ac), Bluetooth 4.2, NFC, GPS, GLONASS, Galileo & QZSS; Models A1660, A1661, A1779 & A1785: TD-SCDMA 1900 (F), 2000 (A) & CDMA2000 EV-DO Rev. A (800, 1900, 2100 MHz); Models A1779 & A1785: LTE (bands 11, 21), FeliCa
- Water resistance: IP67
- Hearing aid compatibility: M3, T4
- Made in: China
- Other: FaceTime audio or video, Voice over LTE
- Website: iPhone 7 – Apple at the Wayback Machine (archived October 1, 2016)

The iPhone 7 and iPhone 7 Plus are smartphones that were developed and marketed by Apple. They are the tenth generation of the iPhone. They were announced on September 7, 2016, at the Bill Graham Civic Auditorium in San Francisco by Apple CEO Tim Cook, and were released on September 16, 2016, succeeding the iPhone 6, iPhone 6 Plus, iPhone 6S and iPhone 6S Plus as the flagship devices in the iPhone series. Apple also released the iPhone 7 and iPhone 7 Plus in numerous countries worldwide throughout September and October 2016. They were succeeded as flagship devices by the iPhone 8 and iPhone 8 Plus on September 12, 2017, and were discontinued with the announcement of the iPhone 11 and iPhone 11 Pro on September 10, 2019.

The iPhone 7's overall design is similar to the iPhone 6 and iPhone 6S. Changes introduced included new color options (Matte Black and Jet Black), water and dust resistance, a new capacitive, static home button, revised antenna bands, larger back camera, and the controversial removal of the 3.5 mm headphone jack. The device's internal hardware received upgrades, including a heterogeneous quad-core system-on-chip with improved system and graphics performance, upgraded 12 megapixel rear-facing cameras with optical image stabilization on all models, and an additional telephoto lens exclusive to the iPhone 7 Plus to provide enhanced (2x) optical zoom capabilities and portrait mode. The front camera is the first in the series with 1080p (Full HD) video resolution. The iPhone 7 and 7 Plus were supported from iOS 10 to iOS 15, and they are the third to support six versions of iOS before support was terminated, after the iPhone 5s.

The iPhone 7 and 7 Plus are the last iPhones to feature a quad-core CPU, an aluminum unibody design without wireless charging, and a base model starting at 32 GB of internal storage. They are the only iPhones to have a jet black color finish.

== History ==
Prior to its announcement, multiple aspects of the iPhone 7 were heavily rumoured. Apple's plans to remove the 3.5 mm headphone jack received significant media attention. Other rumors included a flush camera, stereo speakers, a 256 gigabyte storage option, and a larger 3,100 mAh battery.

On August 29, 2016, invitations to a press event at the Bill Graham Civic Auditorium in San Francisco, California on September 7, 2016, were sent out to members of the media, prompting immediate speculation of the iPhone 7's upcoming announcement. The iPhone 7 was officially announced at that event, with pre-orders beginning September 9, and general availability on September 16.

The iPhone 7 launched in 30 new countries later in September, with further international rollouts throughout October and November 2016. Indonesia was the last country to release the iPhone 7 and 7 Plus, with availability starting on March 31, 2017, following Apple's research and development investment in the country.

On March 21, 2017, Apple announced an iPhone 7 with a red color finish (and white front), as part of its partnership with Product Red to highlight its AIDS fundraising campaign. It launched on March 24, 2017, but it was later discontinued after the announcement of the iPhone 8, iPhone 8 Plus and iPhone X in September 2017 as well as the 256 GB Variant.

On September 12, 2017, Apple announced the iPhone 8 and iPhone 8 Plus as direct successors to the iPhone 7 and 7 Plus, alongside the iPhone X.

The iPhone 7 & 7 Plus, as well as the iPhone XS and its Max variant were discontinued and removed from Apple's website after the announcement of the iPhone 11 and iPhone 11 Pro on September 10, 2019. They are no longer available for sale.

On June 6, 2022, Apple announced on its website that the iPhone 7 and 7 Plus will not receive support for iOS 16. Controversially, the iPad (5th generation), which has the A9 chip, received iPadOS 16, along with the 6th and 7th generation iPads, which have almost identical hardware to the iPhone 7 and 7 Plus respectively.

== Specifications ==
=== Design ===
Color	Name	Front	Antenna
	Jet Black	Black	Black
	Black	Black	Black
	Silver	White	Light Grey
	Gold	White	White
	Rose Gold	White	White
	Product Red	White	Red

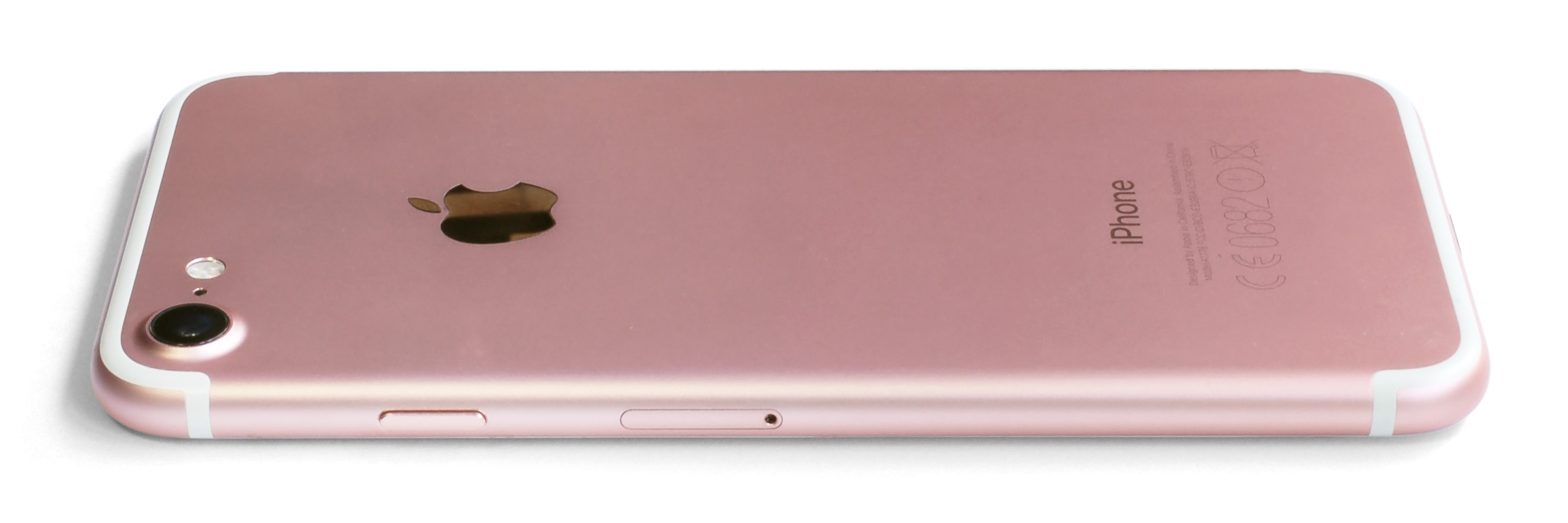
Back and side detail from a standard iPhone 7 in Rose Gold

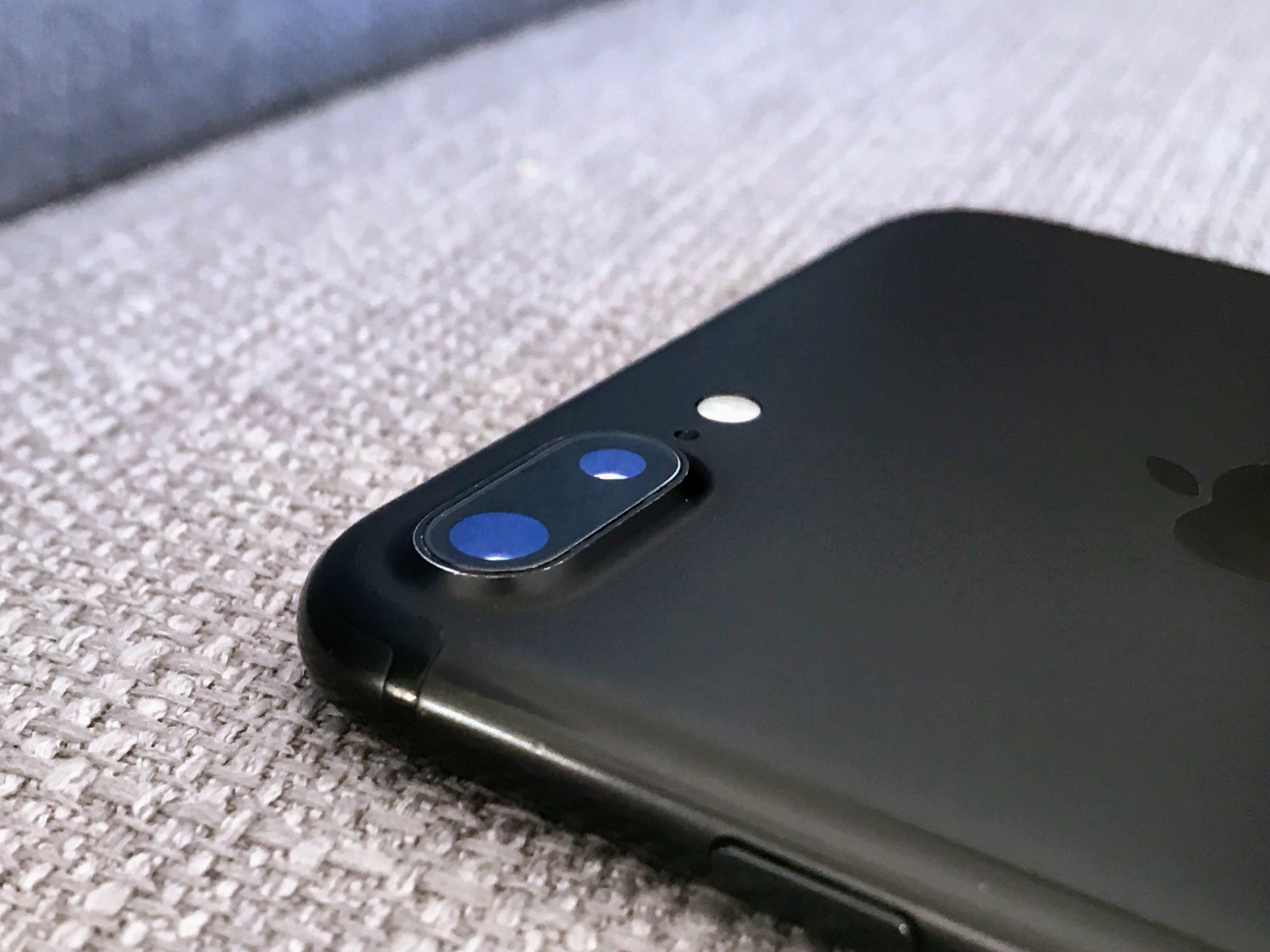
Dual cameras on the back of the iPhone 7 Plus

The iPhone 7's exterior is similar in shape and volume to the iPhone 6 and iPhone 6S, although the camera bump is bigger on the iPhone 7. Alongside the existing silver, gold, and rose gold colors, the device is offered in new colors of matte black, glossy "jet black", and, for a limited time, red. The "jet black" color is a dark shade, high-gloss black finish. It is created through a multi-step process, beginning with an anodization phase to make the surface of the casing a porous aluminum oxide, and then using a machine to sweep the casing through a powdered compound, absorbed by aluminum oxide. The process is concluded with an "ultrafine particle bath" for additional finishing; the entire process takes less than an hour.

==== Water protection ====
iPhone 7 is rated IP67 water and dust resistant, making it the first officially water-resistant iPhone, although tests have resulted in malfunctions, specifically distorted speakers, after water exposure. The warranty does not cover any water damage to the phone.

==== Home button ====
iPhone 7's home button uses a capacitive mechanism for input rather than a physical push-button, as on previous models, meaning direct skin contact (or a capacitive glove) is required to operate the device. Physical feedback is provided via a Taptic Engine vibrator, and the button is also pressure-sensitive. iPhone 7 retains the 3D Touch display system introduced on the iPhone 6S, providing pressure-sensitive touchscreen input.

==== Headphone plug removal ====
Comparison of ports on iPhone 6/6S (top) and iPhone 7 Plus (bottom)

The iPhone 7 and iPhone 7 Plus are the first iPhones not to feature a 3.5mm headphone jack. It was replaced by a second speaker grille that serves as a vent for the internal barometer. A Lightning-to-3.5-mm-connector adapter, as well as in-ear headphones that use the Lightning connector, were bundled with the device, and the adapter is also sold separately as an accessory. The adapter is also compatible with other iPhone, iPad, and iPod Touch devices running iOS 10 and newer.

=== Hardware ===
==== Chipsets ====
iPhone 7 uses the Apple A10 Fusion 64-bit system-on-chip, which consists of two low-power cores and two high-power cores (only two cores are used at any point in time). The A10 chip also features a hexa-core graphics chip capable of "console-level gaming". As with prior models, iPhone 7 is available in two sizes: one with a 4.7 in (120 mm) screen, and a "Plus" variant with a 5.5 in (140 mm) screen. The displays have identical sizes and resolutions to iPhone 6S, but with a wider color gamut and increased brightness. The screen-to-body ratio is about ~66% and ~68% for the 7 and 7 Plus, respectively.

Both device variants also contain a new iteration of Apple's motion coprocessor, the M10. Unlike previous iPhone models, internal storage options for iPhone 7 begin at 32 GB instead of 16 GB, and max out at 256 GB. iPhone 7 Plus offers 3 GB of RAM, more than any other previous iPhone; the 4.7-inch iPhone 7 has 2 GB.

==== Cameras ====
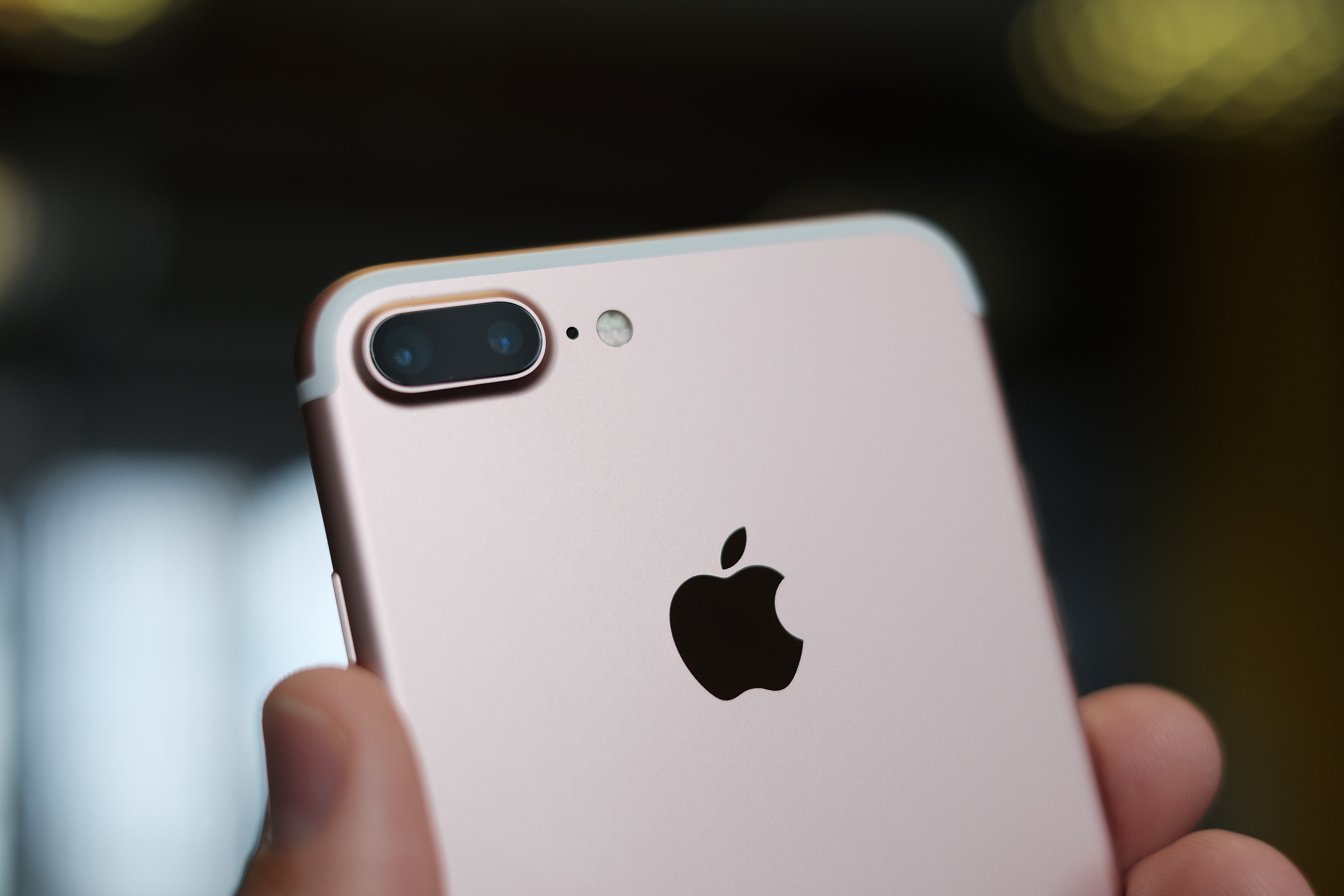
iPhone 7 Plus with dual-lens camera

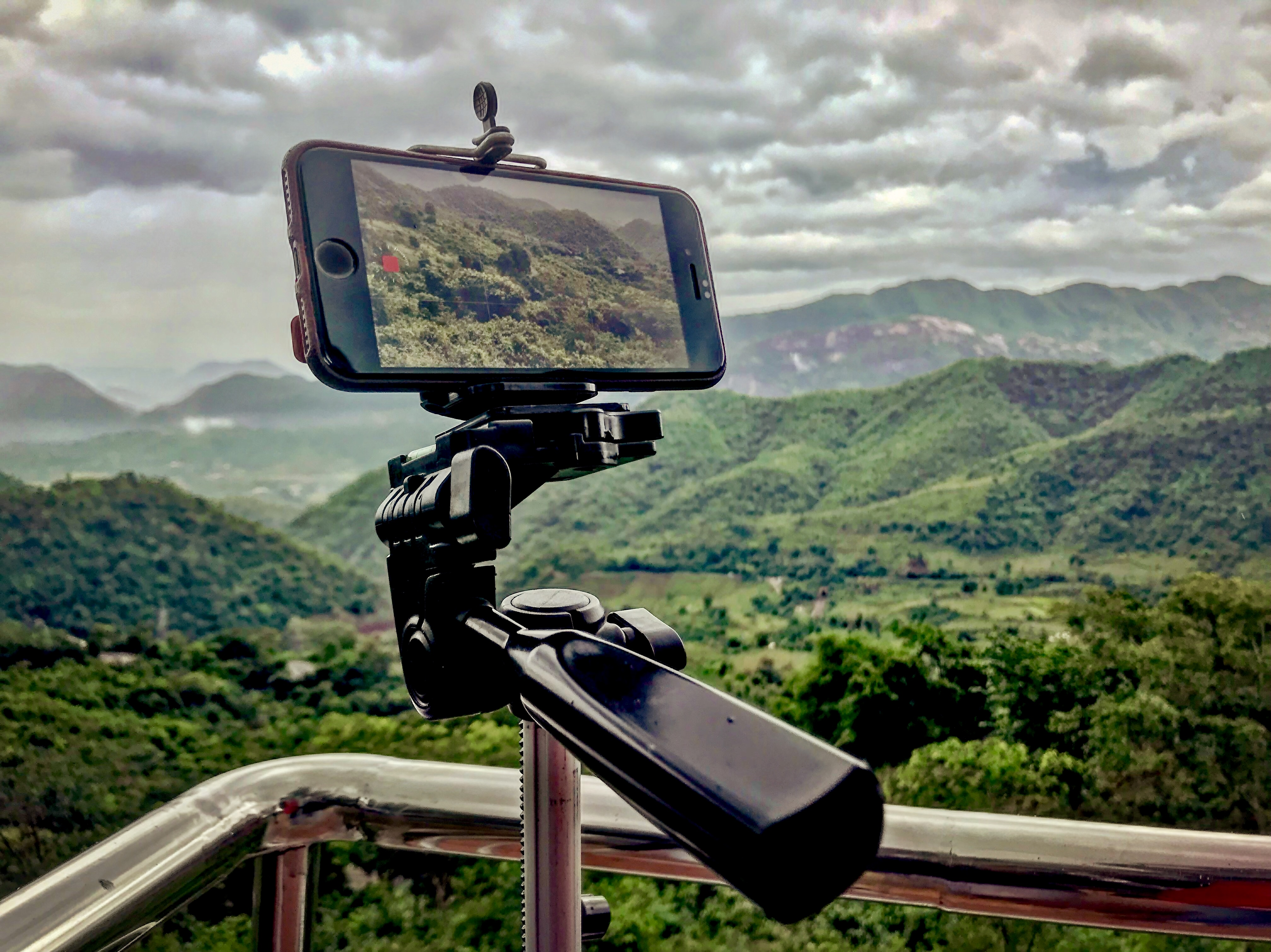
Capturing timelapse photos using an iPhone 7

The iPhone 7 includes a 12-megapixel rear-facing camera with a quad-LED "True Tone" flash; its aperture was widened to f/1.8, and the standard-size phone model adds optical image stabilization – a feature that was previously exclusive to Plus models.

The iPhone 7 Plus includes a second 12-megapixel telephoto lens, which can be used to achieve 2× optical zoom, and up to 10× digital zoom. However, the telephoto camera has an f/2.8 aperture and lacks optical image stabilization.

The iPhone 7 and 7 Plus record video with single-channel mono audio.

Still photos with 6.5 megapixels (3412×1920) can be captured during video recording.

The front-facing camera was upgraded to a 7-megapixel sensor with automatic image stabilization.

The iPhone 7 and 7 Plus are the first iPhones to be able to record 1080p video using the front camera.

=== Battery life ===
The iPhone 7 has a 1,960 mAh (7.45 Wh) battery, offering up to 14 hours of 3G talk time and up to 40 hours of audio playback, while the iPhone 7 Plus features a 2,900 mAh (11.1 Wh) battery, providing up to 21 hours of 3G talk time and up to 60 hours of audio playback.

=== Software ===
The iPhone 7 originally shipped with iOS 10 pre-installed. The iPhone 7 Plus received an exclusive portrait camera mode in the iOS 10.1 software update. This camera mode is capable of producing a bokeh effect using depth of field analysis of the second camera of dual-lens in the back of iPhone 7 Plus. Mainstream software support for the iPhone 7 was dropped when iOS 16 was released. As of January 26, 2026, the iPhone 7 still receives iOS 15 security updates; the current version of iOS that supports it is iOS 15.8.6. The device can also run Android 10 unofficially via a project called Project Sandcastle made by Corellium, a security research company that produces paid iOS, Android, and IoT emulators. Ubuntu 20.04 "Focal Fossa" has also been ported via Project Sandcastle.

=== Accessories ===
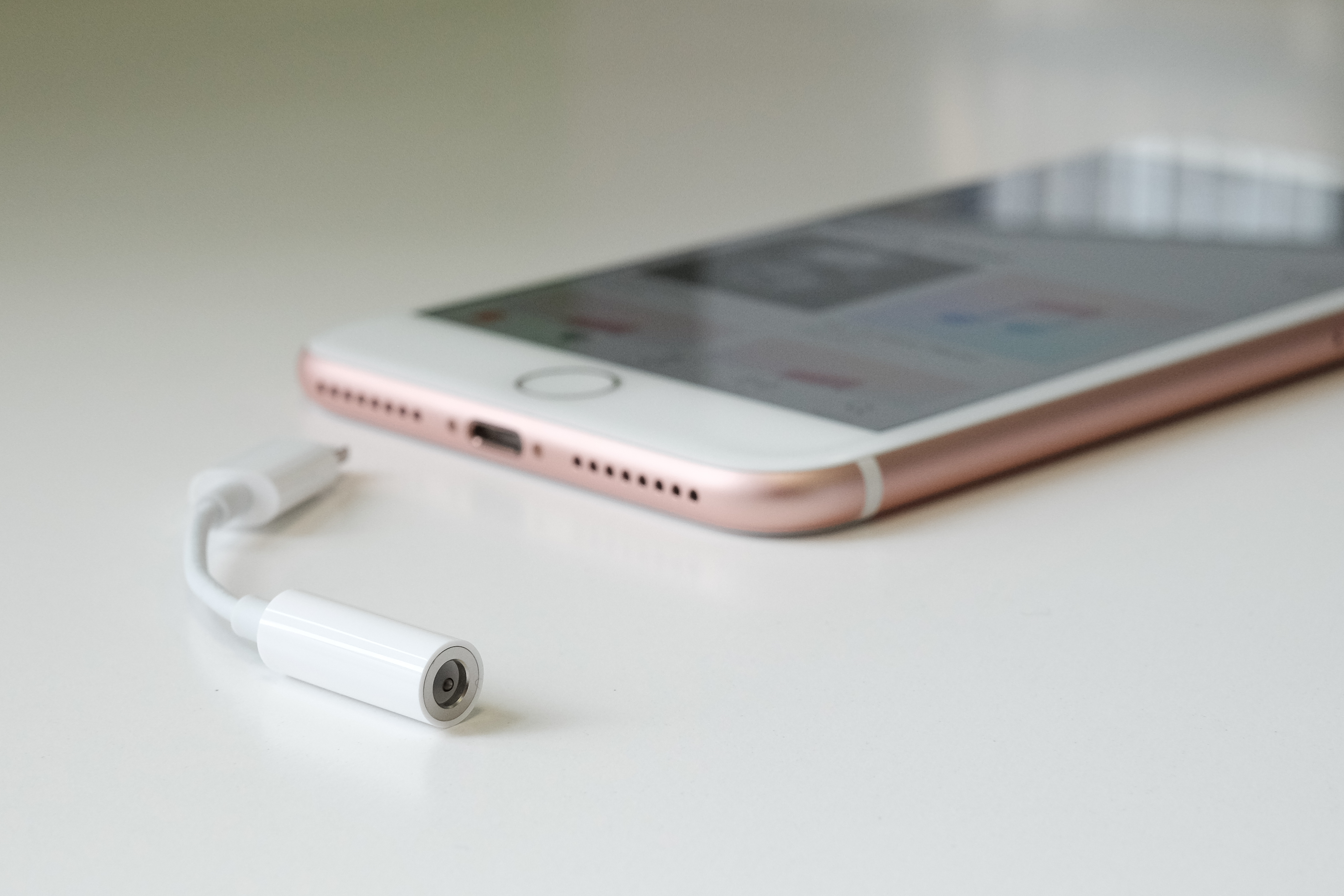
Headphone jack adapter next to an iPhone 7 Plus

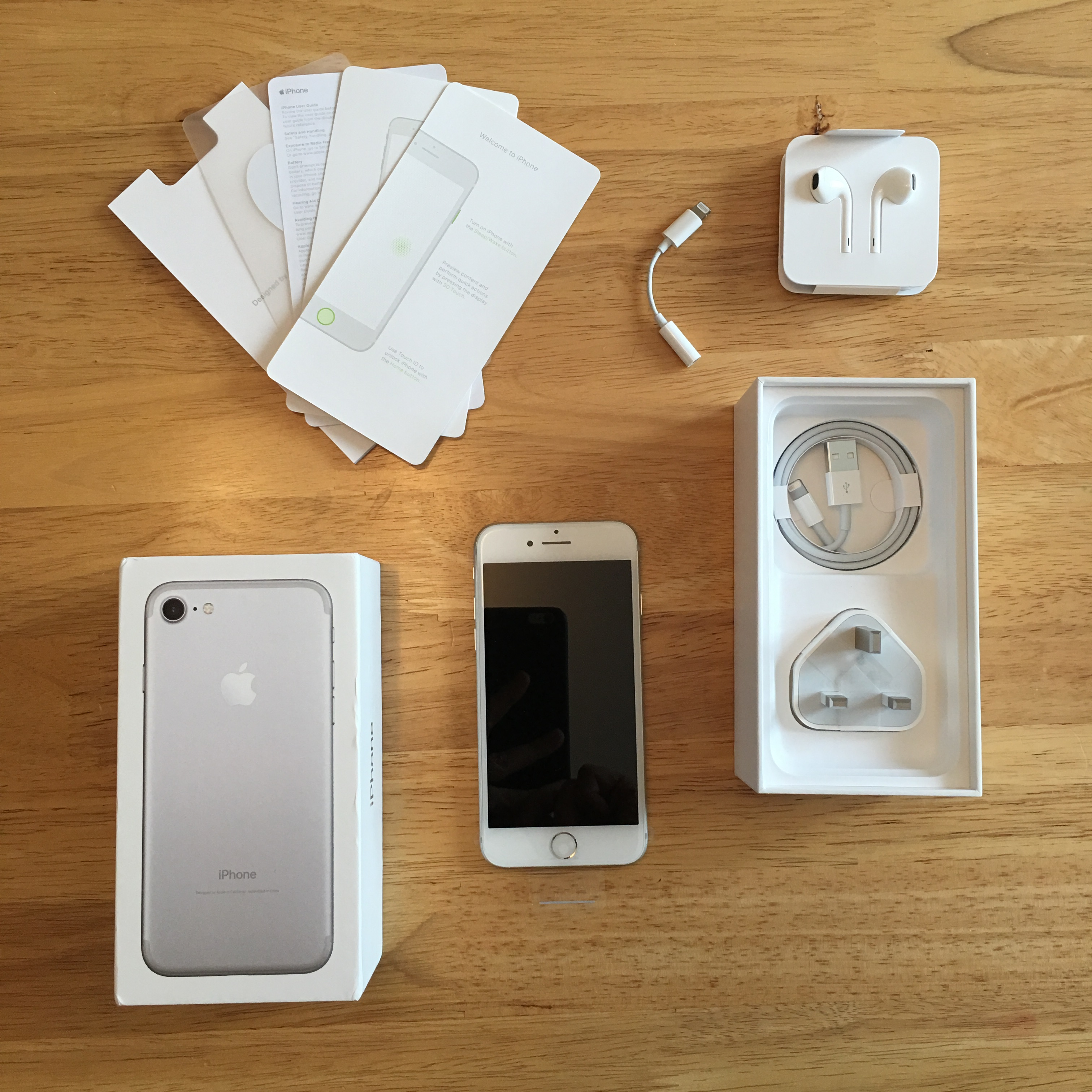
iPhone 7 unboxed set in Silver

Each iPhone 7 originally came with a Lightning-to-3.5-mm adapter, although this was omitted starting on September 12, 2018. Apple sells the adapter independently as well. iPhone 7 does not have a built-in DAC, a Cirrus Logic CS4272 DAC is included as part of the adapter. Apple also unveiled several Bluetooth wireless headphones ostensibly intended for use with the iPhone 7, including AirPods, wireless in-ear headphones, and three new Beats headphone products. All four products utilize an in-house wireless chip known as the Apple W1, which is designed to provide low-power Bluetooth operation and integration with iOS and macOS devices (though they are still compatible with other Bluetooth-supported devices).

=== Headphone jack controversy ===
Criticism of the iPhone 7 centered around the removal of the headphone jack, including the inability to use wired headphones with the included adapter and charge the device simultaneously. (Note: Following the launch of the iPhone 7, Belkin announced an Apple-certified hub accessory that contains two Lightning ports, one intended as a Lightning pass-through for charging and the other for connecting Lightning headphones or the included Lightning-to-headphone jack adapter.)

In a particularly scathing article, Nilay Patel of The Verge wrote that removing the headphone jack, "a deeply established standard" as he put it, would be "user-hostile and stupid". He goes on to list reasons why removing the port is negative, concluding with "No one is asking for this" and "Vote with your dollars".

Gordon Kelly of Forbes noted that wireless audio technology was immature at the moment, with Bluetooth audio quality being inferior and Lightning's audio reliability still in question. The removal of the headphone jack meant that in Patel's words, "You're being pushed into an era where you will have to pay more for decent headphones due to their need for an integrated DAC and/or Lightning licensing", and pointed out that "the only company to profit from this situation is Apple, who will now be charging licensing fees to millions of headphone companies".

In particular, Apple's vice president Phil Schiller, who announced the change, was mocked extensively online for stating that removing the headphone jack took 'courage'. An online petition created by the consumer group SumOfUs, that accuses Apple of planned obsolescence and causing substantial electronic waste by removing the headphone jack, reached over 300,000 signatures.

== Reception ==
Reception of the iPhone 7 was mixed. Although reviewers noted improvements to the camera, especially the dual rear camera on the Plus model, the phone was criticized for the lack of innovation in its build quality. Many reviews panned the removal of the 3.5 mm headphone jack; some critics argued that the change was meant to bolster licensing of the proprietary Lightning connector and the sales of Apple's own wireless headphone products, and questioned the effects of the change on audio quality. Apple was also mocked by critics for Phil Schiller's statement that such a drastic change required "courage".

Gordon Kelly of Forbes noted that rival smartphones, such as the Samsung Galaxy S7, had increased battery life and added water resistance over its predecessor while retaining the headphone jack, and that the iPhone 7's camera photo quality was improved but still lagging behind some phones already on the market, including the Galaxy S7 and Nexus 6P. Kelly praised how Apple was able to extract improved brightness and accurate color reproduction from its LCD screen, while noting that it was old technology which was also well behind rivals who had already moved to sharper 1080p or even 1440p screens. The iPhone 7's exterior, which reuses the aging design of the iPhone 6 and iPhone 6S, was criticized, especially the size of the device and thick top/bottom bezels, with Kelly writing that "the iPhone 7 Plus is simply far too big for a smartphone with a 5.5-inch display".

John McCann of TechRadar wrote that for the first time, the phablet-sized iPhone 7 Plus was "markedly better" than the smaller model. He highlighted improved battery life and praised the camera, calling the Plus' dual cameras "excellent" for point-and-shoot, and "much improved" for low-light performance. McCann wrote that the lack of a headphone jack was "initially frustrating", but noted that it was a "positive step forward for the mobile industry", despite the "short-term effects ... making the most noise for now".

== Issues ==
=== Hissing noises ===
Some users have reported a strange hissing noise during heavy usage of the phone. CNET reports it as "faint buzzes and hums coming from the backside". The Daily Telegraph speculates that the iPhone 7's new A10 Fusion processor is the source of the noise, linking to tweets that compare the phone's hissing sound to "hearing the fans spin up loudly whenever your Mac's CPU gets used to its actual potential."

=== Performance differences ===
The Guardian reported in October 2016 that storage tests from Unbox Therapy and GSMArena showed that the 32 GB iPhone 7 is "significantly" slower than the 128 and 256 GB versions, measuring data write speeds of 341 MB/s on a 128 GB iPhone 7 model versus 42 MB/s on a 32 GB model. October 2016 network tests by Cellular Insights showed that models A1660 and A1661 with Qualcomm modems had "a significant performance edge" over models A1778 and A1784 with Intel modems. Inspection of the modems also found that the Qualcomm version's ability to use Ultra HD Voice had been turned off, likely to "level the playing field between the Qualcomm, and Intel variants". The report concluded with the statement that "We are not sure what was the main reason behind Apple's decision to source two different modem suppliers for the newest iPhone". Bloomberg reported in November 2016 that tests by researchers from Twin Prime and Cellular Insights had shown the two modems to perform similarly on some U.S. cellular networks despite one of the modems being technically capable of faster connectivity. Apple spokeswoman Trudy Muller told the publication that "Every iPhone 7 and iPhone 7 Plus meets or exceeds all of Apple's wireless performance standards, quality metrics, and reliability testing ... In all of our rigorous lab tests based on wireless industry standards, in thousands of hours of real-world field testing, and in extensive carrier partner testing, the data shows there is no discernible difference in the wireless performance of any of the models". Bloomberg quoted analysts and technology advisers who stated that "[Apple] don't want one version to get the reputation that it is better" and that "This may not impact the fanboys, but it may make other consumers think twice about buying an Apple phone, especially if they think they might be purchasing a sub-standard product".

=== Replacing the home button ===
In the iPhone 7, Apple added a software lock that prevents individuals from attempting to replace the home button on their own. Users are now required to go to an Apple Store to have repairs done, with "recalibration" of the button being necessary. This is a step further than Apple went with iPhone 5S, 6 and 6S, where only Touch ID would get disabled but the "return-to-home" functionality still worked.

=== Failure to connect to cellular service ===
Some iPhone 7 devices with the model numbers A1660, A1779, A1780 and A1778 suffer from a problem where they show a "No service" message even when cellular reception is available. Apple will repair those devices for free within four years of the first retail sale of the unit.

=== Loop disease ===
Some iPhone 7 devices suffer from a problem that affects audio in the device. Users reported a grayed-out speaker button during calls, grayed-out voice memo icon, and occasional freezing of the device. A few users also complained that lightning EarPods failed to work with the device and that the Wi-Fi button would be grayed out after restarting the iPhone. On May 4, 2018, Apple acknowledged the issue through an internal memo. If an affected iPhone 7 was no longer covered by warranty, Apple said its service providers could request an exception for this particular issue. The exemptions abruptly ended in July 2018 when Apple deleted the internal document. Many customers have complained Apple has charged customers around $350 to fix the issue. Many customers complain the issue first appeared after a software update.

In February 2025, Apple settled in a class action lawsuit in the amount of $35 million. Affected users in the settlement received varying payments depending on the particulars of their situation. Users who paid for repairs to their phones received the highest amounts.

== Sales ==
Apple has deliberately withheld pre-order sales numbers, citing that these are "no longer a representative metric for our investors and customers". Without releasing specific numbers, T-Mobile US stated that the iPhone 7 had broken the carrier's all-time record for first-day pre-order sales. The following weekend, T-Mobile US stated that iPhone 7 was its biggest iPhone launch ever, being "up nearly 4x compared to the next most popular iPhone".

On September 14, 2016, two days before the iPhone 7 went on sale, Apple announced that due to high demand, they had sold out of all "jet black" iPhone 7's, and all colors of the iPhone 7 Plus. This caused issues for customers in the iPhone Upgrade Program, who were unable to reserve new phones. After customer complaints and a class action lawsuit, Apple made changes to ensure members of the program could get new phones as soon as possible.

In May 2017, analytics research company Strategy Analytics announced that iPhone 7 and iPhone 7 Plus were the best-selling smartphones worldwide during the first quarter of 2017, selling 21.5 million and 17.4 million units, respectively.

=== US carrier trade-in deals ===
For the initial U.S. sales of the iPhone 7, all four major wireless carriers announced trade-in deals. Under the deals, the monthly installment plan cost of the iPhone 7 is negated by a monthly credit on consumers' bill, but consumers who cancel their service with the carrier or pay off the phone prior to the installment contract completion will not receive credits for the remaining months. Jacob Kastrenakes of The Verge noted that the deals effectively constituted a return to two-year phone contracts, in which the deals "essentially lock you into that carrier for two years".

In the wake of these deals, Verizon announced they had seen an increase in sales over the release of the previous year's iPhone 6S, AT&T said that sales had exceeded its expectations, and T-Mobile and Sprint announced "huge increases in sales", with T-Mobile seeing a demand roughly four times higher for the 7 than the 6.

=== Reports about trimmed production ===
In December 2016, DigiTimes reported that Apple had reduced production of the iPhone 7 because of decreasing demand for the product after the initial surge of interest waned. A reason cited was consumers and suppliers turning their attention to next year's iPhone model.

A new report from Nikkei at the end of December included details on sales and production of the iPhone 7. The report, "based on data from suppliers", stated that Apple would trim production of the iPhone 7 by 10% in the first quarter of 2017, following "sluggish" sales. Nikkei reported that Apple previously trimmed production of the iPhone 7 by 20% due to accumulated inventory of the previous model, but that the new models had "sold more sluggishly than expected". Additionally, the report notes that the "iPhone 7 Plus, which features two cameras on its back face, remains popular", but "a shortage of camera sensors has curbed Apple's ability to meet demand for the phones".

== See also ==
- List of iPhone models
- History of the iPhone
- Timeline of iPhone models

== Notes ==
Preceded by iPhone 6S / 6S Plus	iPhone; 10th generation	Succeeded by iPhone 8 / 8 Plus iPhone X
