= PowerVR =

Brand of graphics hardware and software

PowerVR is a division of Imagination Technologies (formerly VideoLogic) that develops hardware and software for 2D and 3D rendering, and for video encoding, decoding, associated image processing and DirectX, OpenGL ES, OpenVG, and OpenCL acceleration. PowerVR also develops AI accelerators called Neural Network Accelerator (NNA).

The PowerVR product line was originally introduced to compete in the desktop PC market for 3D hardware accelerators with a product with a better price–performance ratio than existing products like those from 3dfx Interactive. Rapid changes in that market, notably with the introduction of OpenGL and Direct3D, led to rapid consolidation. PowerVR introduced new versions with low-power electronics that were aimed at the laptop computer market. Over time, this developed into a series of designs that could be incorporated into system-on-a-chip architectures suitable for handheld device use.

PowerVR accelerators are not manufactured by PowerVR, but instead their IP blocks of integrated circuit designs and patents are licensed to other companies, such as Texas Instruments, Intel, NEC, BlackBerry, Renesas, Samsung, Sony, STMicroelectronics, Freescale, Apple, NXP Semiconductors (formerly Philips Semiconductors), and many others.

== Technology ==
The PowerVR chipset uses a method of 3D rendering known as tile-based deferred rendering (often abbreviated as TBDR) which is tile-based rendering combined with PowerVR's proprietary method of Hidden Surface Removal (HSR) and Hierarchical Scheduling Technology (HST). As the polygon generating program feeds triangles to the PowerVR (driver), it stores them in memory in a triangle strip or an indexed format. Unlike other architectures, polygon rendering is (usually) not performed until all polygon information has been collated for the current frame. Furthermore, the expensive operations of texturing and shading of pixels (or fragments) is delayed, whenever possible, until the visible surface at a pixel is determined — hence rendering is deferred.

In order to render, the display is split into rectangular sections in a grid pattern. Each section is known as a tile. Associated with each tile is a list of the triangles that visibly overlap that tile. Each tile is rendered in turn to produce the final image.

Tiles are rendered using a process similar to ray-casting. Rays are numerically simulated as if cast onto the triangles associated with the tile and a pixel is rendered from the triangle closest to the camera. The PowerVR hardware typically calculates the depths associated with each polygon for one tile row in 1 cycle.

This method has the advantage that, unlike a more traditional early Z rejection based hierarchical systems, no calculations need to be made to determine what a polygon looks like in an area where it is obscured by other geometry. It also allows for correct rendering of partially transparent polygons, independent of the order in which they are processed by the polygon producing application. (This capability was only implemented in Series 2 including Dreamcast and one MBX variant. It is generally not included for lack of API support and cost reasons.) More importantly, as the rendering is limited to one tile at a time, the whole tile can be in fast on-chip memory, which is flushed to video memory before processing the next tile. Under normal circumstances, each tile is visited just once per frame.

PowerVR is a pioneer of tile based deferred rendering. Microsoft also conceptualized the idea with their abandoned Talisman project. Gigapixel, a company that developed IP for tile-based 3D graphics, was purchased by 3dfx, which in turn was subsequently purchased by Nvidia. Nvidia has now been shown to use tile rendering in the Maxwell and Pascal microarchitectures for a limited amount of geometry.

ARM began developing another major tile based architecture known as Mali after their acquisition of Falanx.

Intel uses a similar concept in their integrated graphics products. However, its method, called zone rendering, does not perform full hidden surface removal (HSR) and deferred texturing, therefore wasting fillrate and texture bandwidth on pixels that are not visible in the final image.

Recent advances in hierarchical Z-buffering have effectively incorporated ideas previously only used in deferred rendering, including the idea of being able to split a scene into tiles and of potentially being able to accept or reject tile sized pieces of polygon.

Today, the PowerVR software and hardware suite has ASICs for video encoding, decoding and associated image processing. It also has virtualisation, and DirectX, OpenGL ES, OpenVG, and OpenCL acceleration. Newest PowerVR Wizard GPUs have fixed-function Ray Tracing Unit (RTU) hardware and support hybrid rendering.

== PowerVR Graphics ==
=== Series1 (NEC) ===
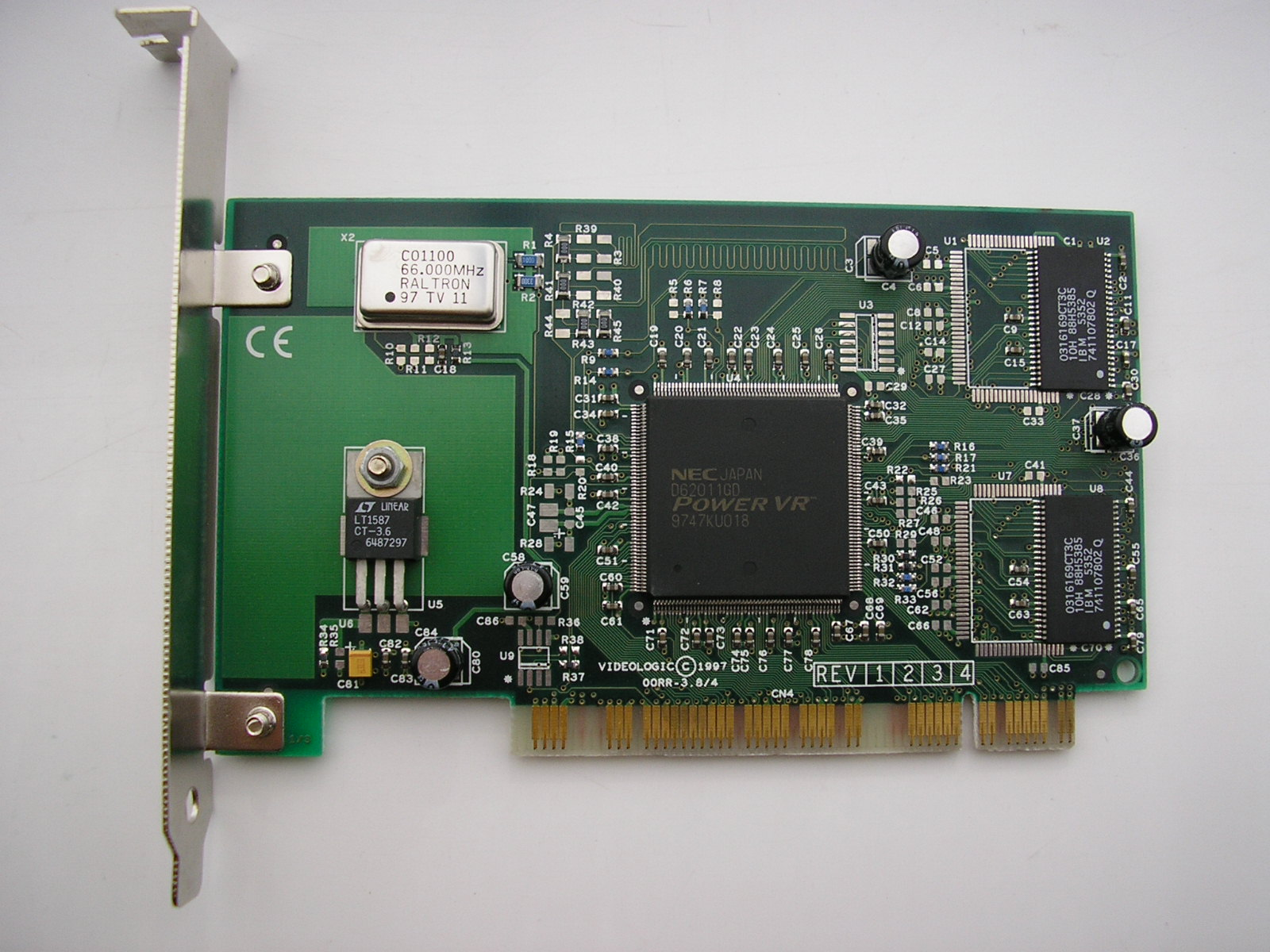
VideoLogic Apocalypse 3Dx (NEC PowerVR PCX2 chip)

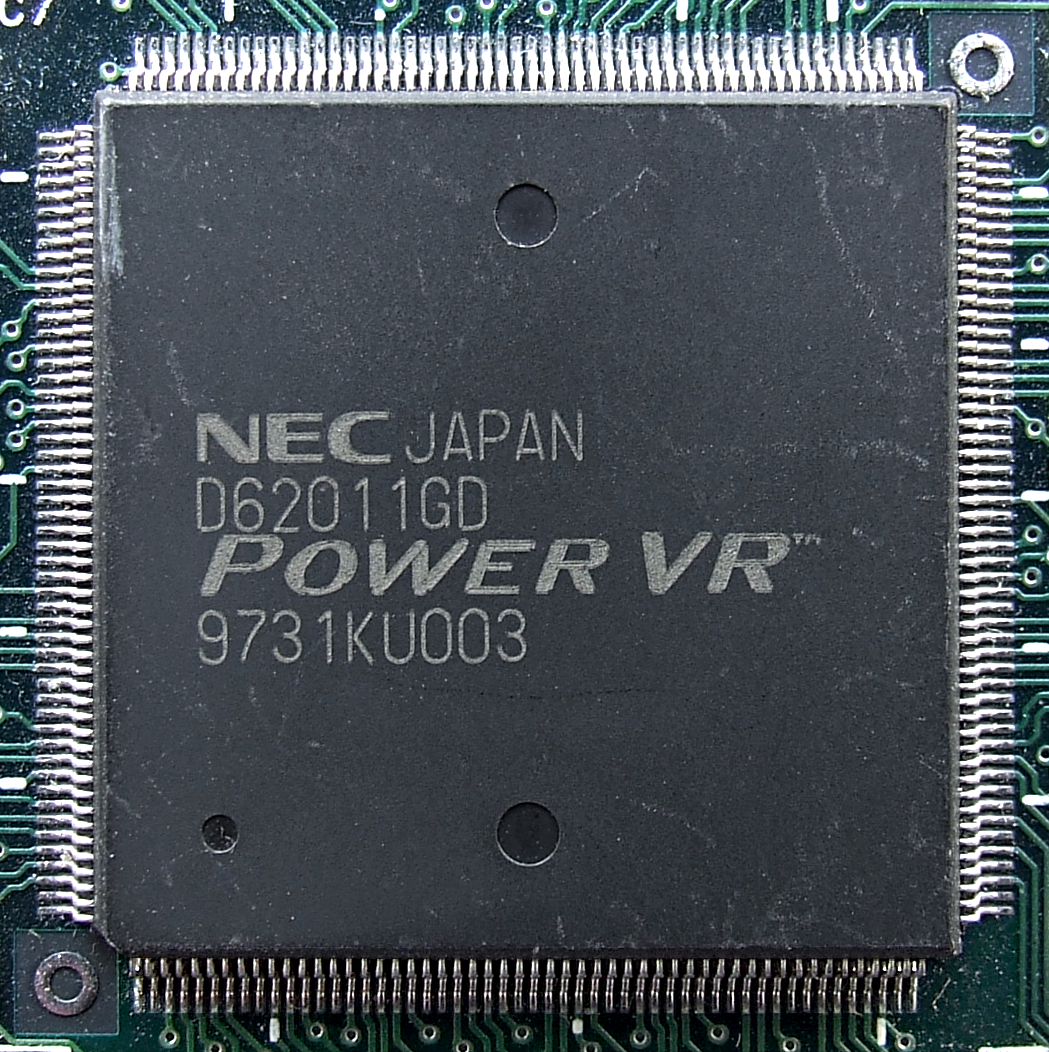
NEC D62011GD (PowerVR PCX2)

The first series of PowerVR cards was mostly designed as 3D-only accelerator boards that would use the main 2D video card's memory as framebuffer over PCI. Videologic's first PowerVR PC product to market was the 3-chip Midas3, which saw very limited availability in some OEM Compaq PCs. This card had very poor compatibility with all but the first Direct3D games, and even most SGL games did not run. However, its internal 24-bit color precision rendering was notable for the time.

The single-chip PCX1 was released in retail as the VideoLogic Apocalypse 3D and featured an improved architecture with more texture memory, ensuring better game compatibility. This was followed by the further refined PCX2, which clocked 6 MHz higher, offloaded some driver work by including more chip functionality and added bilinear filtering, and was released in retail on the Matrox M3D and Videologic Apocalypse 3Dx cards. There was also the Videologic Apocalypse 5D Sonic, which combined the PCX2 accelerator with a Tseng ET6100 2D core and ESS Agogo sound on a single PCI board.

The PowerVR PCX cards were placed in the market as budget products and performed well in the games of their time, but weren't quite as fully featured as the 3DFX Voodoo accelerators (due to certain blending modes being unavailable, for instance). However, the PowerVR approach of rendering to the 2D card's memory meant that much higher 3D rendering resolutions could be possible in theory, especially with PowerSGL games that took full advantage of the hardware.

- All models support DirectX 3.0 and PowerSGL, MiniGL drivers available for select games

Model	Launch	Fab (nm)	Memory (MiB)	Core clock (MHz)	Memory clock (MHz)	Core config^{1}	Fillrate				Memory		
Model	Launch	Fab (nm)	Memory (MiB)	Core clock (MHz)	Memory clock (MHz)	Core config^{1}	MOperations/s	MPixels/s	MTexels/s	MPolygons/s	Bandwidth (GB/s)	Bus type	Bus width (bit)
Midas3	1996	?	2	66	66	1:1	66	66	66	0	0.24^{2}	SDR+FPM^{2}	32+16^{2}
PCX1	1996	500	4	60	60	1:1	60	60	60	0	0.48	SDR	64
PCX2	1997	350	4	66	66	1:1	66	66	66	0	0.528	SDR	64

- ^{1} Texture mapping units: render output units
- ^{2} Midas3 is 3-chip (vs. single-chip PCX series) and uses a split memory architecture: 1 MB 32-bit SDRAM (240 MB/s peak bandwidth) for textures and 1 MB 16-bit FPM DRAM for geometry data (and presumably for PCI communication). PCX series has only texture memory.

=== Series2 (NEC) ===
The second generation PowerVR2 ("PowerVR Series2", chip codename "CLX2") was brought to market in the Dreamcast console between 1998 and 2001. As part of an internal competition at Sega to design the successor to the Saturn, the PowerVR2 was licensed to NEC and was chosen ahead of a rival design based on the 3dfx Voodoo2. It was called "the Highlander Project" during development. The PowerVR2 was paired with the Hitachi SH-4 in the Dreamcast, with the SH-4 as the T&L geometry engine and the PowerVR2 as the rendering engine. The PowerVR2 also powered the Sega Naomi, the upgraded arcade system board counterpart of the Dreamcast.

However, the success of the Dreamcast meant that the PC variant, sold as Neon 250, appeared a year late to the market, in late 1999. The Neon 250 was nevertheless competitive with the RIVA TNT2 and Voodoo3. The Neon 250 features inferior hardware specifications compared to the PowerVR2 part used in Dreamcast, such as a halved tile size, among others.

- All models are fabricated with a 250 nm process
- All models support DirectX 6.0
- PMX1 supports PowerSGL 2 and includes a MiniGL driver optimized for Quake III Arena

Model	Launch	Memory (MiB)	Core clock (MHz)	Memory clock (MHz)	Core config^{1}	Fillrate				Memory		
Model	Launch	Memory (MiB)	Core clock (MHz)	Memory clock (MHz)	Core config^{1}	MOperations/s	MPixels/s	MTexels/s	MPolygons/s	Bandwidth (GB/s)	Bus type	Bus width (bit)
CLX2	1998	8	100	100	1:1	3200	3200 ^{2} 100 ^{3}	3200 ^{2} 100 ^{3}	7 ^{4}	0.8	SDR	64
PMX1	1999	32	125	125	1:1	125	125	125	0	1	SDR	64

- ^{1} Texture mapping units: render output units
- ^{2} Fillrate for opaque polygons.
- ^{3} Fillrate for translucent polygons with hardware sort depth of 60.
- ^{4} Hitachi SH-4 geometry engine calculates T&L for more than 10 million triangles per second. CLX2 rendering engine throughput is 7 million triangles per second.

=== Series3 (STMicro) ===
In 2000, the third generation PowerVR3 STG4000 KYRO was released, manufactured by new partner STMicroelectronics. The architecture was redesigned for better game compatibility and expanded to a dual-pipeline design for more performance. The refresh STM PowerVR3 KYRO II, released later in 2001, likely had a lengthened pipeline to attain higher clock speeds and was able to rival the more expensive ATI Radeon DDR and NVIDIA GeForce 2 GTS in some benchmarks of the time, despite its modest specifications on paper and lack of hardware transform and lighting (T&L), a fact that Nvidia especially tried to capitalize on in a confidential paper they sent out to reviewers. As games increasingly started to include more geometry with this feature in mind, the KYRO II lost its competitiveness.

The KYRO series had a decent featureset for a budget-oriented GPU in their time, including a few Direct3D 8.1-compliant features such as 8-layer multitexturing (not 8-pass) and Environment Mapped Bump Mapping (EMBM); Full Scene Anti-Aliasing (FSAA) and Trilinear/Anisotropic filtering were also present. KYRO II could also perform Dot Product (Dot3) Bump Mapping at a similar speed as GeForce 2 GTS in benchmarks. Omissions included hardware T&L (an optional feature in Direct3D 7), Cube Environment Mapping and legacy 8-bit paletted texture support. While the chip supported S3TC/DXTC texture compression, only the (most commonly used) DXT1 format was supported. Support for the proprietary PowerSGL API was also dropped with this series.

16-bit output quality was excellent compared to most of its competitors, thanks to rendering to its internal 32-bit tile cache and downsampling to 16-bit instead of straight use of a 16-bit framebuffer. This could play a role in improving performance without losing much image quality, as memory bandwidth was not plentiful. However, due to its unique concept on the market, the architecture could sometimes exhibit flaws such as missing geometry in games, and therefore the driver had a notable amount of compatibility settings, such as switching off the internal Z-buffer. These settings could cause a negative impact on performance.

A second refresh of the KYRO was planned for 2002, the STG4800 KYRO II SE. Samples of this card were sent to reviewers but it does not appear to have been brought to market. Apart from a clockspeed boost, this refresh was announced with a "EnT&L" HW T&L software emulation, which eventually made it into the drivers for the previous KYRO cards starting with version 2.0. The STG5500 KYRO III, based upon the next-generation PowerVR4, was completed and would have included hardware T&L but was shelved due to STMicro closing its graphics division.

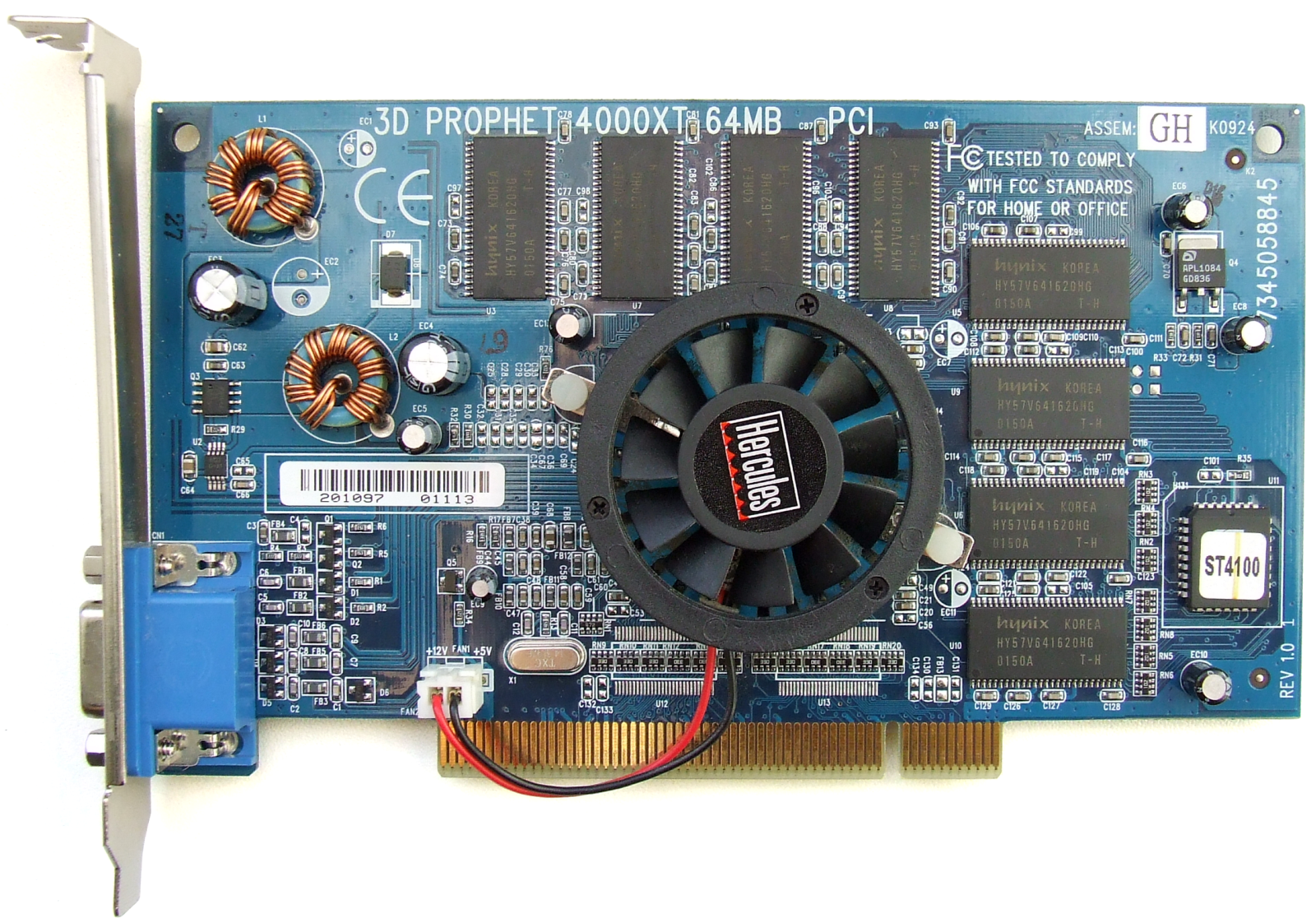
Hercules 3D Prophet 4000XT 64MB PCI with the KYRO chipset.

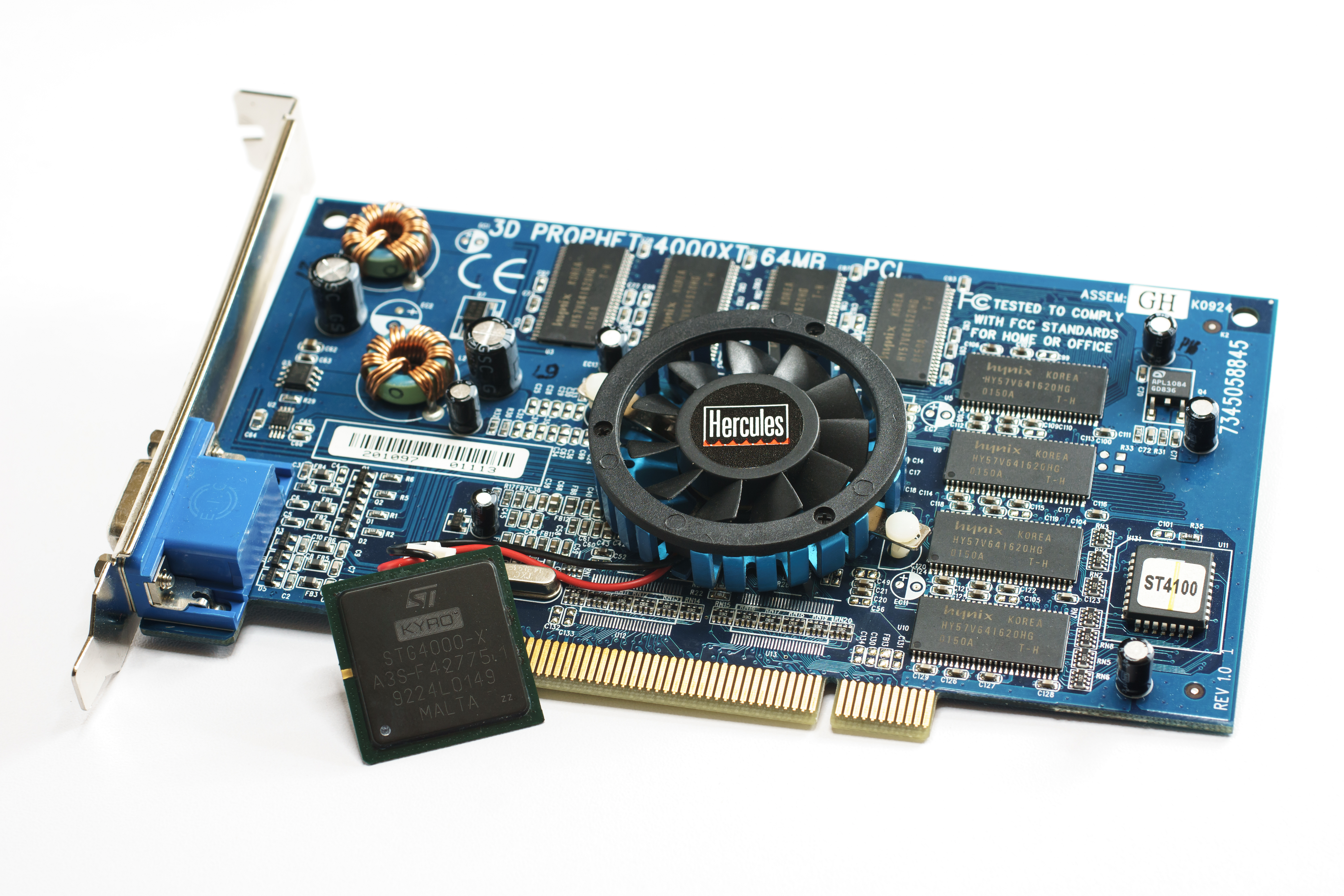
The Hercules 3D Prophet 4000XT aside a Kyro chipset

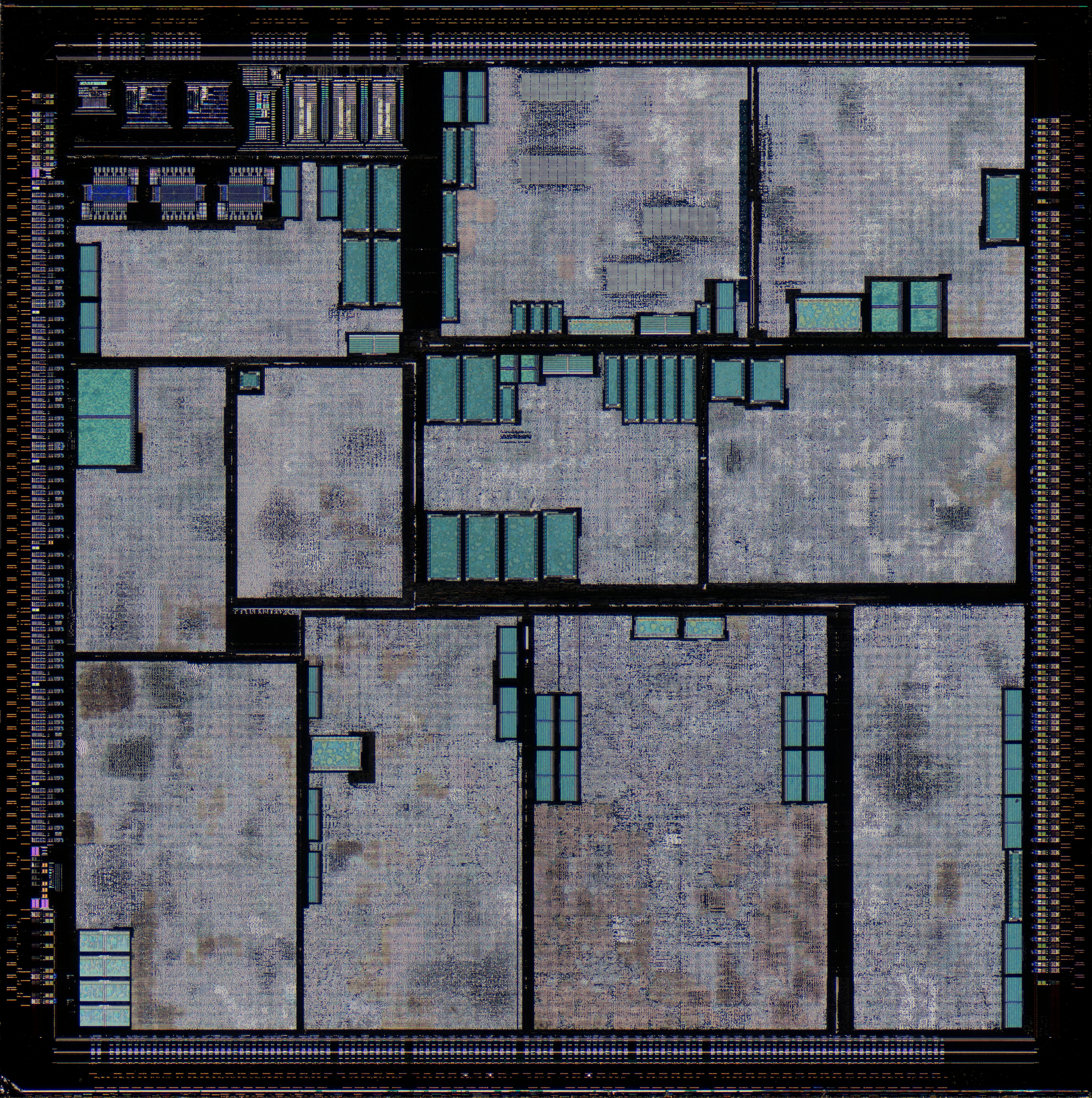
Die shot of the Kyro chipset

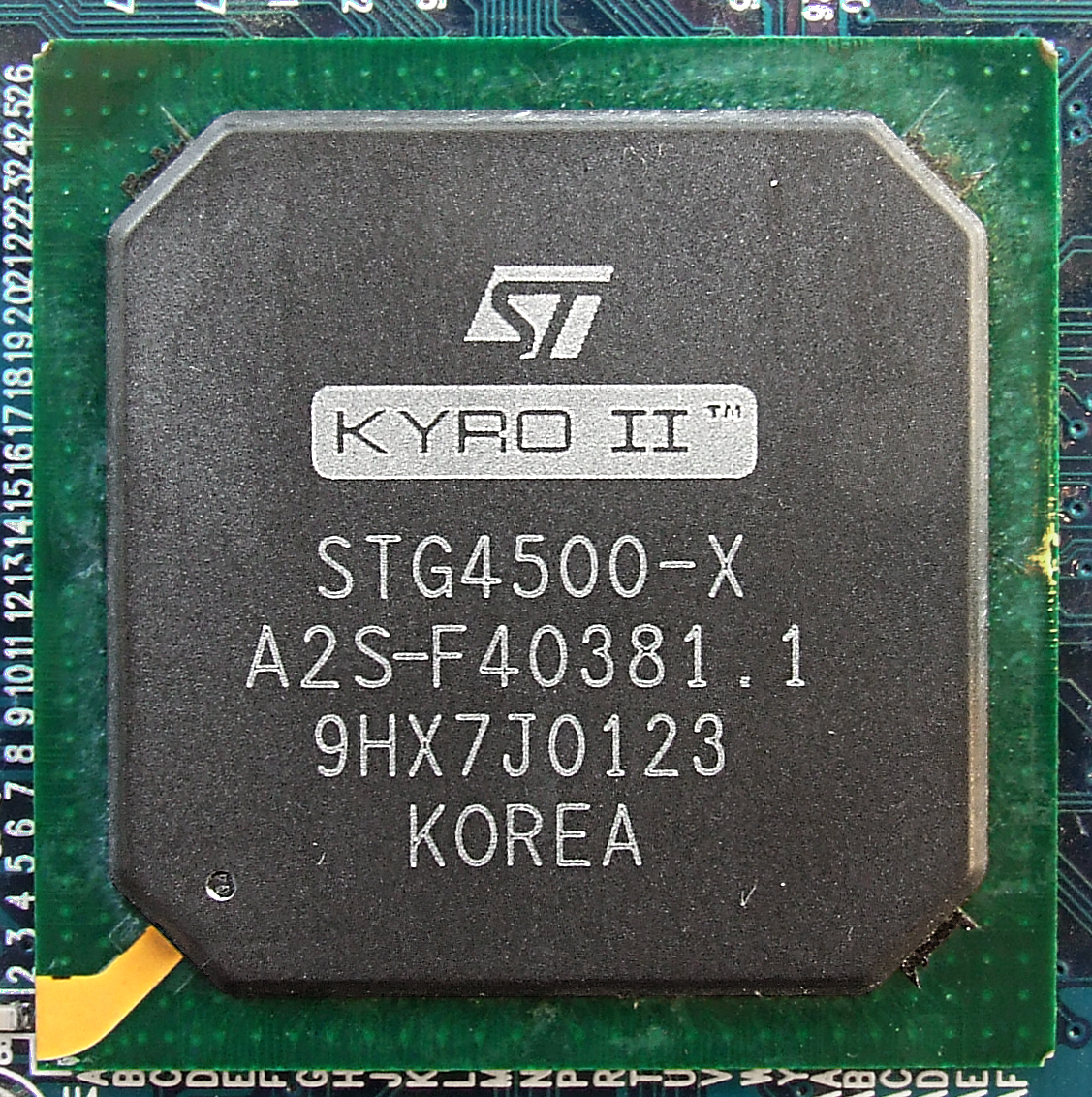
KYRO II.

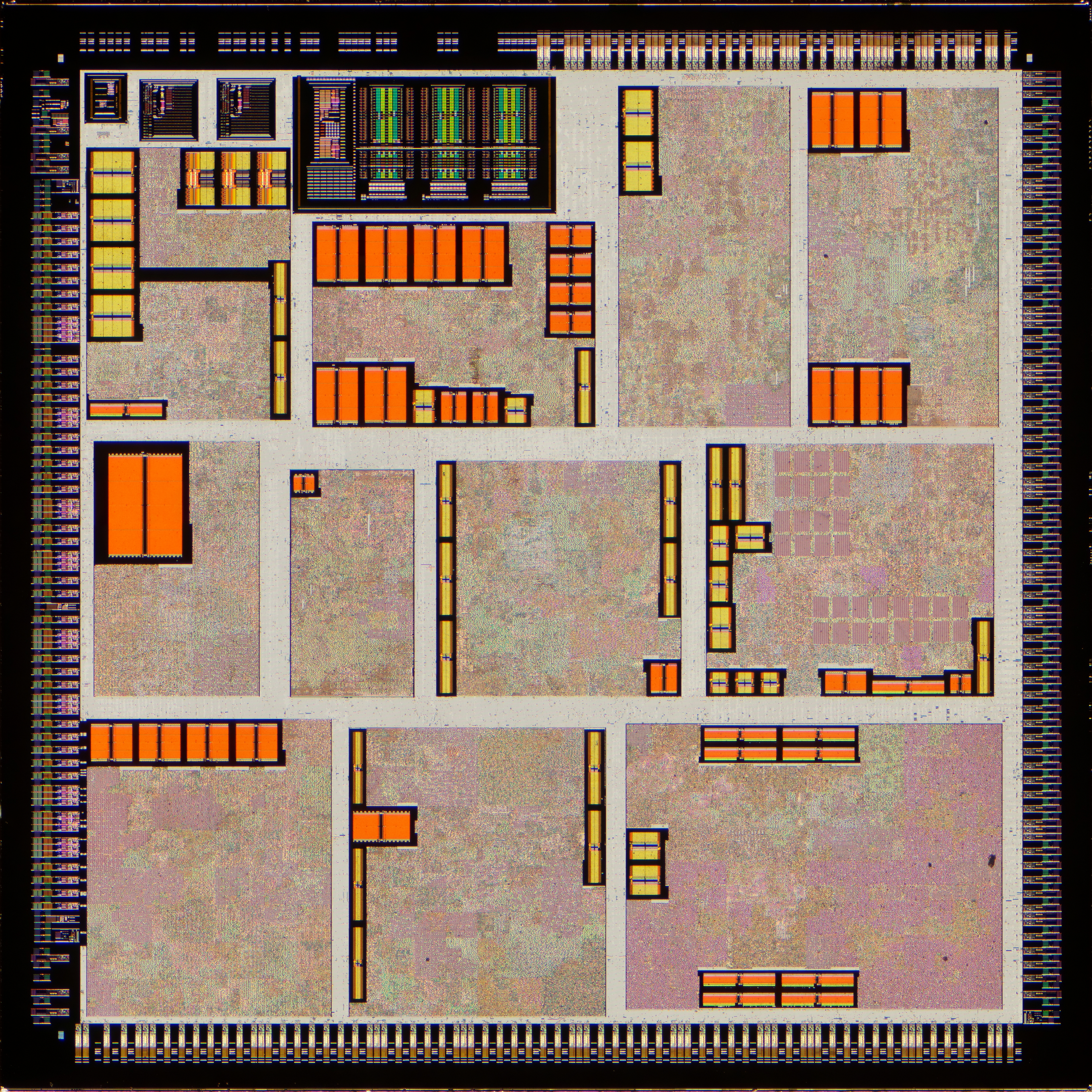
Die shot of the Kyro II
- All models support DirectX 6.0

Model	Launch	Fab (nm)	Memory (MiB)	Core clock (MHz)	Memory clock (MHz)	Core config^{1}	Fillrate				Memory		
Model	Launch	Fab (nm)	Memory (MiB)	Core clock (MHz)	Memory clock (MHz)	Core config^{1}	MOperations/s	MPixels/s	MTexels/s	MPolygons/s	Bandwidth (GB/s)	Bus type	Bus width (bit)
STG4000 KYRO	2000	250	32/64	115	115	2:2	230	230	230	0	1.84	SDR	128
STG4500 KYRO II	2001	180	32/64	175	175	2:2	350	350	350	0	2.8	SDR	128
STG4800 KYRO II SE	2002	180	64	200	200	2:2	400	400	400	0	3.2	SDR	128
STG5500 KYRO III	Never Released	130	64	250	250	4:4	1000	1000	1000	0	8	DDR	128

- ^{1} Texture mapping units: render output units

=== Series4 (STMicro) ===
PowerVR achieved great success in the mobile graphics market with its low power PowerVR MBX. MBX, and its SGX successors, were licensed a number of the top mobile semiconductor manufacturers in their mobile SoC chipsets, including Intel, Texas Instruments, Samsung, NEC, NXP Semiconductors, Freescale, Renesas, SiRF, Marvell, and Sunplus.

These mobile chipsets with MBX IP in turn were used in several high-end cellphones and smartphones, including the original iPhone and iPod Touch (with Samsung S5L8900), Nokia N95 and Motorola RIZR Z8 (with TI OMAP 2420), and the Sony Ericsson P1 and M600 (NXP Nexperia PNX4008). It was also used in some PDAs such as the Dell Axim X50V and X51V featuring the Intel 2700G co-processor, as well as in set-top boxes featuring the MBX Lite-powered Intel CE 2110.

There were two variants: MBX and MBX Lite. Both had the same feature set, where the MBX was optimized for speed and MBX Lite was optimized for low power consumption. The MBX could also be paired up with options to include either a full or lite FPU, and/or full or lite VGP (Vector Graphics Processor).

Model	Year	Die Size (mm^{2}) (Note: Official Imgtec data)	Core config	Fillrate @ 200 MHz		Bus width (bit)	API (version)	
Model	Year	Die Size (mm^{2})	Core config	MTriangles/s	MPixel/s	Bus width (bit)	DirectX	OpenGL
MBX Lite	Feb 2001	4 @ 130 nm?	0/1/1/1	1.0	100	64	7.0, VS 1.1	1.1
MBX	Feb 2001	8 @ 130 nm?	0/1/1/1	1.68	150	64	7.0, VS 1.1	1.1

=== Series5 (SGX) ===
PowerVR's Series5 SGX series features pixel, vertex, and geometry shader hardware, supporting OpenGL ES 2.0 and DirectX 10.1 with Shader Model 4.1.

The SGX GPU core is included in several popular systems-on-chip (SoC) used in many portable devices. Apple uses the A4 (manufactured by Samsung) in their iPhone 4, iPad, iPod Touch, and Apple TV, and in the Apple Watch as part of Apple S1. Texas Instruments' OMAP 3 and 4 series SoC's are used in the Amazon's Kindle Fire HD 8.9", Barnes and Noble's Nook HD(+), BlackBerry PlayBook, Nokia N9, Nokia N900, Sony Ericsson Vivaz, Motorola Droid/Milestone, Motorola Defy, Motorola RAZR D1/D3, Droid Bionic, Archos 70, Palm Pre, Samsung Galaxy SL, Galaxy Nexus, Open Pandora, and others. Samsung produces the Hummingbird SoC and uses it in their Samsung Galaxy S, Galaxy Tab, Samsung Wave S8500 Samsung Wave II S8530 and Samsung Wave III S860 devices. Hummingbird is also in Meizu M9 smartphone.

Intel used a number of SGX products in its Menlow, Moorestown, Medfield and Clover Trail+ Atom-based MID platforms. Using the SGX graphics chipsets helped Intel to successfully achieve the ultra-low power budgets required for passively cooled devices, such as smartphones, tablets and netbooks. However, the significant difference in graphics architecture resulted in poor driver support.

Model	Year	Die Size (mm^{2})	Core config (Note: USSE (Universal Scalable Shader Engine) lanes/TMUs)	Fillrate @ 200 MHz		Bus width (bit)	API (version)			GFLOPS @ 200 MHz
Model	Year	Die Size (mm^{2})	Core config	MTriangles/s	MPixel/s	Bus width (bit)	OpenGL ES	OpenGL	Direct3D	GFLOPS @ 200 MHz
SGX520	Jul 2005	2.6@65 nm	1/1	7	100	32-128	2.0	—N/a	—N/a	0.8
SGX530	Jul 2005	7.2@65 nm	2/1	14	200	32-128	2.0	—N/a	—N/a	1.6
SGX531	Oct 2006	?	2/1	14	200	32-128	2.0	—N/a	—N/a	1.6
SGX535	Nov 2007	?	2/2	14	400	32-128	2.0	2.1	9.0c	1.6
SGX540	Nov 2007	?	4/2	20	400	32-128	2.0	2.1	—N/a	3.2
SGX545	Jan 2010	12.5@65 nm	4/2	40	400	32-128	2.0	3.2	10.1	3.2

=== Series5XT (SGX) ===
PowerVR Series5XT SGX chips are multi-core variants of the SGX series with some updates. It is included in the PlayStation Vita portable gaming device with the MP4+ Model of the PowerVR SGX543, the only intended difference, aside from the + indicating features customized for Sony, is the cores, where MP4 denotes 4 cores (quad-core) whereas the MP8 denotes 8 cores (octo-core). The Allwinner A31 (quad-core mobile application processor) features the dual-core SGX544 MP2. The Apple iPad 2 and iPhone 4S with the A5 SoC also feature a dual-core SGX543MP2. The iPad (3rd generation) A5X SoC features the quad-core SGX543MP4. The iPhone 5 A6 SoC features the tri-core SGX543MP3. The iPad (4th generation) A6X SoC features the quad-core SGX554MP4. The Exynos variant of the Samsung Galaxy S4 sports the tri-core SGX544MP3 clocked at 533 MHz.

Model	Date	Clusters	Die Size (mm^{2})	Core config (Note: USSE2 (Universal Scalable Shader Engine 2) lanes/TMUs)	Fillrate @ 200 MHz			Bus width (bit)	HSA-features	API (version)				GFLOPS @ 200 MHz (per core)
Model	Date	Clusters	Die Size (mm^{2})	Core config	MPolygons/s	(GP/s)	(GT/s)	Bus width (bit)	HSA-features	OpenGL ES	OpenGL	OpenCL	Direct3D	GFLOPS @ 200 MHz (per core)
SGX543	Jan 2009	1-16	5.4@32 nm	4/2	35	3.2	?	128-256	?	2.0	2.0?	1.1	9.0 L1	6.4
SGX544	Jun 2010	1-16	5.4@32 nm	4/2	35	3.2	?	128-256	?	2.0	0.0	1.1	9.0 L3	6.4
SGX554	Dec 2010	1-16	8.7@32 nm	8/2	35	3.2	?	128-256	?	2.0	2.1	1.1	9.0 L3	12.8

These GPU can be used in either single-core or multi-core configurations.

=== Series5XE (SGX) ===
Introduced in 2014, the PowerVR GX5300 GPU is based on the SGX architecture and is the world's smallest Android-capable graphics core, providing low-power products for entry-level smartphones, wearables, IoT and other small footprint embedded applications, including enterprise devices such as printers.

Model	Date	Clusters	Die Size (mm^{2})	Core config	Fillrate @ 200 MHz			Bus width (bit)	HSA-features	API (version)				GFLOPS @ 200 MHz (per core)
Model	Date	Clusters	Die Size (mm^{2})	Core config	MPolygons/s	(GP/s)	(GT/s)	Bus width (bit)	HSA-features	OpenGL ES	OpenGL	OpenCL	Direct3D	GFLOPS @ 200 MHz (per core)
GX5300	Jul 2014	?	0.55@28 nm	?	?	?	?	?	?	2.0	?	?	?	0.8

=== Series6 (Rogue) ===
PowerVR Series6 GPUs are based on an evolution of the SGX architecture codenamed Rogue. ST-Ericsson (now defunct) announced that its Nova application processors would include Imagination's next-generation PowerVR Series6 architecture. MediaTek announced the quad-core MT8135 system on a chip (SoC) (two ARM Cortex-A15 and two ARM Cortex-A7 cores) for tablets. Renesas announced its R-Car H2 SoC includes the G6400. Allwinner Technology A80 SoC, (4 Cortex-A15 and 4 Cortex-A7) that is available in the Onda V989 tablet, features a PowerVR G6230 GPU. The Apple A7 SoC integrates a graphics processing unit (GPU) which AnandTech believes to be a PowerVR G6430 in a four cluster configuration.

Intel also continued its use of PowerVR graphics exclusively in its ultra-low-power Merrifield and Moorefield smartphone Atom platforms.

PowerVR Series 6 GPUs have 2 TMUs/cluster.

Model	Date	Clusters	Die Size (mm^{2})	Core config (Note: USC (Unified Shading Cluster) lanes/TMUs per cluster)	SIMD lane	Fillrate @ 600 MHz			Bus width (bit)	HSA-features	API (version)					GFLOPS @ 600 MHz FP32/FP16
Model	Date	Clusters	Die Size (mm^{2})	Core config	SIMD lane	MPolygons/s	(GP/s)	(GT/s)	Bus width (bit)	HSA-features	Vulkan	OpenGL ES	OpenGL	OpenCL	Direct3D	GFLOPS @ 600 MHz FP32/FP16
G6100	Feb 2013	1	??@28 nm	1/4	16	?	2.4		128	?	1.1	3.1	2.x	1.2	9.0 L3	38.4 / 57.6
G6200	Jan 2012	2	??@28 nm	2/2	32	?	2.4		?	?	1.1	3.1	3.2	1.2	10.0	76.8 / 76.8
G6230	Jun 2012	2	??@28 nm	2/2	32	?	2.4		?	?	1.1	3.1	3.2	1.2	10.0	76.8 / 115.2
G6400	Jan 2012	4	??@28 nm	4/2	64	?	4.8		?	?	1.1	3.1	3.2	1.2	10.0	153.6 / 153.6
G6430	Jun 2012	4	??@28 nm	4/2	64	?	4.8		?	?	1.1	3.1	3.2	1.2	10.0	153.6 / 230.4
G6630	Nov 2012	6	??@28 nm	6/2	96	?	7.2		?	?	1.1	3.1	3.2	1.2	10.0	230.4 / 345.6

=== Series6XE (Rogue) ===
PowerVR Series6XE GPUs are based around Series6 and designed as entry-level chips aimed at offering roughly the same fillrate compared to the Series5XT series. They however feature refreshed API support such as Vulkan, OpenGL ES 3.1, OpenCL 1.2 and DirectX 9.3 (9.3 L3). Rockchip and Realtek have used Series6XE GPUs in their SoCs.

PowerVR Series 6XE GPUs were announced on January 6, 2014.

Model	Date	Clusters	Die Size (mm^{2})	Core config	SIMD lane	Fillrate			Bus width (bit)	HSA-features	API (version)					GFLOPS(@ 600 MHz) FP32/FP16
Model	Date	Clusters	Die Size (mm^{2})	Core config	SIMD lane	MPolygons/s	(GP/s)	(GT/s)	Bus width (bit)	HSA-features	Vulkan	OpenGL ES	OpenGL	OpenCL	Direct3D	GFLOPS(@ 600 MHz) FP32/FP16
G6050	Jan 2014	0.5	??@28 nm	?/?	?	?	??	?	?	?	1.1	3.1	3.2	1.2	9.0 L3	19.2 / 38.4
G6060	Jan 2014	0.5	??@28 nm	?/?	?	?	??	?	?	?	1.1	3.1	3.2	1.2	9.0 L3	19.2 / 38.4
G6100 (XE)	Jan 2014	1	??@28 nm	?/?	?	?	??	?	?	?	1.1	3.1	3.2	1.2	9.0 L3	38.4 / 76.8
G6110	Jan 2014	1	??@28 nm	?/?	?	?	??	?	?	?	1.1	3.1	3.2	1.2	9.0 L3	38.4 / 76.8

=== Series6XT (Rogue) ===
PowerVR Series6XT GPUs aims at reducing power consumption further through die area and performance optimization providing a boost of up to 50% compared to Series6 GPUs. Those chips sport PVR3C triple compression system-level optimizations and Ultra HD deep color. The Apple iPhone 6, iPhone 6 Plus and iPod Touch (6th generation) with the A8 SoC feature the quad-core GX6450. An unannounced 8 cluster variant was used in the Apple A8X SoC for their iPad Air 2 model (released in 2014). The MediaTek MT8173 and Renesas R-Car H3 SoCs use Series6XT GPUs.

PowerVR Series 6XT GPUs were unveiled on January 6, 2014.

Model	Date	Clusters	Die Size (mm^{2})	Core config	SIMD lane	Fillrate @ 450 MHz			Bus width (bit)	HSA-features	API (version)					GFLOPS @ 450 MHz FP32/FP16
Model	Date	Clusters	Die Size (mm^{2})	Core config	SIMD lane	MPolygons/s	(GP/s)	(GT/s)	Bus width (bit)	HSA-features	Vulkan	OpenGL ES	OpenGL	OpenCL	Direct3D	GFLOPS @ 450 MHz FP32/FP16
GX6240	Jan 2014	2	??@28 nm	2/4	64/128	?			?	?	1.1	3.1	3.3	1.2	10.0	57.6/115.2
GX6250	Jan 2014	2	??@28 nm	2/4	64/128	35	2.8		128	?	1.1	3.1	3.3	1.2	10.0	57.6/115.2
GX6450	Jan 2014	4	19.1mm2@28 nm	4/8	128/256	?	3.6		?	?	1.1	3.1	3.3	1.2	10.0	115.2/230.4
GX6650	Jan 2014	6	??@28 nm	6/12	192/384	?			?	?	1.1	3.1	3.3	1.2	10.0	172.8/345.6
GXA6850	Unannounced	8	38mm2@28 nm	8/16	256/512	?			128	?	1.1	3.1	3.3	1.2	10.0	230.4/460.8

=== Series7XE (Rogue) ===
PowerVR Series 7XE GPUs were announced on 10 November 2014. When announced, the 7XE series contained the smallest Android Extension Pack compliant GPU.

Model	Date	Clusters	Die Size (mm^{2})	Core config	SIMD lane	Fillrate @ 650 MHz			Bus width (bit)	HSA-features	API (version)					GFLOPS (FP32) @ 650 MHz
Model	Date	Clusters	Die Size (mm^{2})	Core config	SIMD lane	MPolygons/s	(GP/s)	(GT/s)	Bus width (bit)	HSA-features	Vulkan	OpenGL ES	OpenGL	OpenCL	Direct3D	GFLOPS (FP32) @ 650 MHz
GE7400	Nov 2014	0.5									1.1	3.1		1.2 embedded profile	9.0 L3	20.8
GE7800	Nov 2014	1									1.1	3.1		1.2 embedded profile	9.0 L3	41.6

=== Series7XT (Rogue) ===
PowerVR Series7XT GPUs are available in configurations ranging from two to 16 clusters, offering dramatically scalable performance from 100 GFLOPS to 1.5 TFLOPS. The GT7600 is used in the Apple iPhone 6s and iPhone 6s Plus models (released in 2015) as well as the Apple iPhone SE model (released in 2016) and the Apple iPad model (released in 2017) respectively. An unannounced 12 cluster variant was used in the Apple A9X SoC for their iPad Pro models (released in 2015).

PowerVR Series 7XT GPUs were unveiled on 10 November 2014.

Model	Date	Clusters	Die Size (mm^{2})	Core config	SIMD lane	Fillrate @ 650 MHz			Bus width (bit)	HSA-features	API (version)					GFLOPS @ 650 MHz FP32/FP16
Model	Date	Clusters	Die Size (mm^{2})	Core config	SIMD lane	MPolygons/s	(GP/s)	(GT/s)	Bus width (bit)	HSA-features	Vulkan	OpenGL ES	OpenGL	OpenCL	Direct3D	GFLOPS @ 650 MHz FP32/FP16
GT7200	Nov 2014	2		2/4	64/128						1.1	3.1	3.3 (4.4 optional)	1.2 embedded profile (FP optional)	10.0 (11.2 optional)	83.2/166.4
GT7400	Nov 2014	4		4/8	128/256						1.1	3.1	3.3 (4.4 optional)	1.2 embedded profile (FP optional)	10.0 (11.2 optional)	166.4/332.8
GT7600	Nov 2014	6		6/12	192/384						1.1	3.1	3.3 (4.4 optional)	1.2 embedded profile (FP optional)	10.0 (11.2 optional)	249.6/499.2
GT7800	Nov 2014	8		8/16	256/512						1.1	3.1	3.3 (4.4 optional)	1.2 embedded profile (FP optional)	10.0 (11.2 optional)	332.8/665.6
GTA7850	Unannounced	12		12/24	384/768						1.1	3.1	3.3 (4.4 optional)	1.2 embedded profile (FP optional)	10.0 (11.2 optional)	499.2/998.4
GT7900	Nov 2014	16		16/32	512/1024						1.1	3.1	3.3 (4.4 optional)	1.2 embedded profile (FP optional)	10.0 (11.2 optional)	665.6/1331.2

=== Series7XT Plus (Rogue) ===
PowerVR Series7XT Plus GPUs are an evolution of the Series7XT family and add specific features designed to accelerate computer vision on mobile and embedded devices, including new INT16 and INT8 data paths that boost performance by up to 4x for OpenVX kernels. Further improvements in shared virtual memory also enable OpenCL 2.0 support. The GT7600 Plus is used in the Apple iPhone 7 and iPhone 7 Plus models (released in 2016) as well as the Apple iPad model (released in 2018).

PowerVR Series 7XT Plus GPUs were announced on International CES, Las Vegas – 6 January 2016.

Series7XT Plus achieve up to 4x performance increase for vision applications.

Model	Date	Clusters	Die Size (mm^{2})	Core config	SIMD lane	Fillrate @ 650 MHz			Bus width (bit)	HSA-features	API (version)						GFLOPS @ 650 MHz FP32/FP16
Model	Date	Clusters	Die Size (mm^{2})	Core config	SIMD lane	MPolygons/s	(GP/s)	(GT/s)	Bus width (bit)	HSA-features	Vulkan (API)	OpenGL ES	OpenGL	OpenVX	OpenCL	Direct3D	GFLOPS @ 650 MHz FP32/FP16
GT7200 Plus	January 2016	2	?	2/4	64/128		2.6				1.1	3.2	3.3 (4.4 optional)	1.0.1	2.0	??	83.2/166.4
GT7400 Plus	January 2016	4	?	4/8	128/256		5.2				1.1	3.2	3.3 (4.4 optional)	1.0.1	2.0	??	166.4/332.8
GT7600 Plus	June 2016	6	??@10 nm	6/12	192/384		7.8				1.1	3.2	4.4	1.0.1	2.0	12	249.6/499.2

The GPUs are designed to offer improved in-system efficiency, improved power efficiency and reduced bandwidth for vision and computational photography in consumer devices, mid-range and mainstream smartphones, tablets and automotive systems such as advanced driver assistance systems (ADAS), infotainment, computer vision and advanced processing for instrument clusters.

The new GPUs include new feature set enhancements with a focus on next-generation compute:

Up to 4x higher performance for OpenVX/vision algorithms compared to the previous generation through improved integer (INT) performance (2x INT16; 4x INT8) Bandwidth and latency improvements through shared virtual memory (SVM) in OpenCL 2.0 Dynamic parallelism for more efficient execution and control through support for device enqueue in OpenCL 2.0

=== Series8XE (Rogue) ===
PowerVR Series8XE GPUs support OpenGL ES 3.2 and Vulkan 1.x and are available in 1, 2, 4 and 8 pixel/clock configurations, enabling the latest games and apps and further driving down the cost of high quality UIs on cost sensitive devices.

PowerVR Series 8XE were announced February 22, 2016 at the Mobile World Congress 2016. They are an iteration of the Rogue microarchitecture and target entry-level SoC GPU market. New GPUs improve the performance/mm² for the smallest silicon footprint and power profile, while also incorporating hardware virtualization and multi-domain security. Newer model were later released in January 2017, with a new low end and high end part.

Model	Date	Clusters	Die Size (mm^{2})	Core config	SIMD lane	Fillrate @ 650 MHz			Bus width (bit)	HSA-features	API (version)						GFLOPS @ 650 MHz FP32/FP16
Model	Date	Clusters	Die Size (mm^{2})	Core config	SIMD lane	MPolygons/s	(GP/s)	(GT/s)	Bus width (bit)	HSA-features	Vulkan (API)	OpenGL ES	OpenGL	OpenVX	OpenCL	Direct3D	GFLOPS @ 650 MHz FP32/FP16
GE8100	January 2017	0.25 USC		?	?		0.65				1.1	3.2	?	1.1	1.2 EP	9.3 (optional)	10.4 / 20.8
GE8200	February 2016	0.25 USC		?	?		1.3				1.1	3.2	?	1.1	1.2 EP	9.3 (optional)	10.4 / 20.8
GE8300	February 2016	0.5 USC		?	?	0.5	2.6				1.1	3.2	?	1.1	1.2 EP	9.3 (optional)	20.8 / 41.6
GE8310	February 2016	0.5 USC		?	?	0.5	2.6				1.1	3.2	?	1.1	1.2 EP	9.3 (optional)	20.8 / 41.6
GE8430	January 2017	2 USC		?	?		5.2				1.1	3.2	?	1.1	1.2 EP	9.3 (optional)	83.2 / 166.4

=== Series8XEP (Rogue) ===
PowerVR Series8XEP were announced January 2017. There are an iteration of the Rogue microarchitecture and target the mid range SoC GPU market, targeting 1080p. The Series8XEP remains focused on die size and performance per unit

Model	Date	Clusters	Die Size (mm^{2})	Core config	SIMD lane	Fillrate @ 650 MHz			Bus width (bit)	HSA-features	API (version)						GFLOPS @ 650 MHz FP32/FP16
Model	Date	Clusters	Die Size (mm^{2})	Core config	SIMD lane	MPolygons/s	(GP/s)	(GT/s)	Bus width (bit)	HSA-features	Vulkan (API)	OpenGL ES	OpenGL	OpenVX	OpenCL	Direct3D	GFLOPS @ 650 MHz FP32/FP16
GE8320	January 2017	1 USC		?	?		2.6				1.1	3.2	?	1.1	1.2 EP	?	41.6 / 83.2
GE8325	January 2017	1 USC		?	?		2.6				1.1	3.2	?	1.1	1.2 EP	?	41.6 / 83.2
GE8340	January 2017	2 USC		?	?		2.6				1.1	3.2	?	1.1	1.2 EP	?	83.2 / 166.4

=== Series8XT (Furian) ===
Announced on 8 March 2017, Furian is the first new PowerVR architecture since Rogue was introduced five years earlier.

PowerVR Series 8XT were announced March 8, 2017. It is the first series GPU's based on the new Furian architecture. According to Imagination, GFLOPS/mm² is improved 35% and Fill rate/mm^{2} is improved 80% compared to the 7XT Plus series on the same node. Specific designs have not been announced as of March 2017. Series8XT features 32-wide pipeline clusters.

Model	Date	Clusters	Die Size (mm^{2})	Cluster config	SIMD lane	Fillrate @ 650 MHz			Bus width (bit)	HSA-features	API (version)						GFLOPS @ 650 MHz FP32/FP16
Model	Date	Clusters	Die Size (mm^{2})	Cluster config	SIMD lane	MPolygons/s	(GP/s)	(GT/s)	Bus width (bit)	HSA-features	Vulkan (API)	OpenGL ES	OpenGL	OpenVX	OpenCL	Direct3D	GFLOPS @ 650 MHz FP32/FP16
GT8525	March 2017	2		2/?	64		5.2				1.1	3.2	?	1.1	2.0	?	62.4/124.8
GT8540	January 2018	4		4/?	128		10.4				1.1	3.2	?	1.1	2.0	?	124.8/249.6

=== Series9XE (Rogue) ===
Announced in September 2017, Series9XE family of GPUs benefit from up to 25% Bandwidth savings over the previous generation GPUs. The Series9XE family is targeted for set-top boxes (STB), digital TVs (DTV) and low end smartphones SoCs Note: Data in table is per cluster.

Model	Date	Clusters	Die Size (mm^{2})	Core config	SIMD lane	Fillrate @ 650 MHz			Bus width (bit)	HSA-features	API (version)						GFLOPS (FP32) @ 650 MHz
Model	Date	Clusters	Die Size (mm^{2})	Core config	SIMD lane	MPolygons/s	(GP/s)	(GT/s)	Bus width (bit)	HSA-features	Vulkan (API)	OpenGL ES	OpenGL	OpenVX	OpenCL	Direct3D	GFLOPS (FP32) @ 650 MHz
GE9000	September 2017	0.25		16/1			0.65				1.1	3.2		1	1.2 EP		10.4
GE9100	September 2017	0.25		16/2			1.3				1.1	3.2		1	1.2 EP		10.4
GE9115	January 2018	0.5		32/2			1.3				1.1	3.2		1	1.2 EP		20.8
GE9210	September 2017	0.5		32/4			2.6				1.1	3.2		1	1.2 EP		20.8
GE9215	January 2018	0.5		32/4			2.6				1.1	3.2		1	1.2 EP		20.8
GE9420	September 2017										1.1	3.2		1	1.2 EP		

=== Series9XM (Rogue) ===
The Series9XM family of GPUs achieve up to 50% better performance density than the previous 8XEP generation. The Series9XM family targets mid-range smartphone SoCs.

Model	Date	Clusters	Die Size (mm^{2})	Core config	SIMD lane	Fillrate @ 650 MHz			Bus width (bit)	HSA-features	API (version)						GFLOPS (FP32) @ 650 MHz
Model	Date	Clusters	Die Size (mm^{2})	Core config	SIMD lane	MPolygons/s	(GP/s)	(GT/s)	Bus width (bit)	HSA-features	Vulkan (API)	OpenGL ES	OpenGL	OpenVX	OpenCL	Direct3D	GFLOPS (FP32) @ 650 MHz
GM9125	September 2017	1		64/4			1.3				1.3	3.2		1	2.0		41.6
GM9220	September 2017	1		64/4			2.6				1.1	3.2		1	1.2 EP		41.6
GM9226	September 2017	1		64/4			2.6				1.3	3.2		1	1.2 EP		41.6
GM9240	September 2017	2		128/4			2.6				1.1	3.2		1	1.2 EP		83.2
GM9446	September 2017	2		128/4			5.2				1.3	3.2		1	1.2 EP		83.2
GM9740	September 2017	2		128/4			2.6				1.3	3.2		1	3.0		83.2

=== Series9XEP (Rogue) ===
The Series9XEP family of GPUs was announced on December 4, 2018. The Series9XEP family supports PVRIC4 image compression. The Series9XEP family targets set-top boxes (STB), digital TVs (DTV) and low end smartphones SoCs.

Model	Date	Clusters	Die Size (mm^{2})	Core config	SIMD lane	Fillrate @ 650 MHz			Bus width (bit)	HSA-features	API (version)						GFLOPS (FP32) @ 650 MHz
Model	Date	Clusters	Die Size (mm^{2})	Core config	SIMD lane	MPolygons/s	(GP/s)	(GT/s)	Bus width (bit)	HSA-features	Vulkan (API)	OpenGL ES	OpenGL	OpenVX	OpenCL	Direct3D	GFLOPS (FP32) @ 650 MHz
GE9608	December 2018	0.5		32/?			1.3				1.3	3.2		1	1.2 EP		20.8
GE9610	December 2018	0.5		32/?			?				1.3	3.2		1	1.2 EP		20.8
GE9710	December 2018	0.5		32/?			?				1.3	3.2		1	1.2 EP		20.8
GE9920	December 2018	1		64/?			5.2				1.3	3.2		1	1.2 EP		41.6

=== Series9XMP (Rogue) ===
The Series9XMP family of GPUs was announced on December 4, 2018. The Series9XMP family supports PVRIC4 image compression. The Series9XMP family targets mid-range smartphone SoCs.

Model	Date	Clusters	Die Size (mm^{2})	Core config	SIMD lane	Fillrate @ 650 MHz			Bus width (bit)	HSA-features	API (version)						GFLOPS (FP32) @ 650 MHz
Model	Date	Clusters	Die Size (mm^{2})	Core config	SIMD lane	MPolygons/s	(GP/s)	(GT/s)	Bus width (bit)	HSA-features	Vulkan (API)	OpenGL ES	OpenGL	OpenVX	OpenCL	Direct3D	GFLOPS (FP32) @ 650 MHz
GM9740	December 2018	2		128/?			?				1.1	3.2		1	1.2 EP		83.2

=== Series9XTP (Furian) ===
The Series9XTP family of GPUs was announced on December 4, 2018. The Series9XTP family supports PVRIC4 image compression. The Series9XTP family targets high-end smartphone SoCs. Series9XTP features 40-wide pipeline clusters.

Model	Date	Clusters	Die Size (mm^{2})	Core config	SIMD lane	Fillrate @ 650 MHz			Bus width (bit)	HSA-features	API (version)						GFLOPS (FP32) @ 650 MHz
Model	Date	Clusters	Die Size (mm^{2})	Core config	SIMD lane	MPolygons/s	(GP/s)	(GT/s)	Bus width (bit)	HSA-features	Vulkan (API)	OpenGL ES	OpenGL	OpenVX	OpenCL	Direct3D	GFLOPS (FP32) @ 650 MHz
GT9524	December 2018	?		?/?			5.2				1.3	3.x		1	3.0		156

=== IMG A-Series (Albiorix) ===
The A-Series GPUs offer up to 250% better performance density than the previous Series 9. These GPUs are no longer called PowerVR, they are called IMG.

Model	Date	SPUs	RACs	Core config	SIMD lane	Fillrate @ 1 GHz		Bus width (bit)	API (version)				GFLOPS (FP32) @ 1 GHz
Model	Date	SPUs	RACs	Core config	SIMD lane	(GP/s)	(GT/s)	Bus width (bit)	Vulkan (API)	OpenGL ES	OpenCL	Direct3D	GFLOPS (FP32) @ 1 GHz
IMG AXE-1-16	December 2019	1		1/?		1			1.3	3.x	3.0	?	16
IMG AXE-2-16	December 2019	1		1/?		2			1.3	3.x	3.0	?	16
IMG AXM-8-256	December 2019	1		1/?		8			1.3	3.x	3.0	?	256
IMG AXT-16-512	December 2019	2		2/?		16			1.3	3.x	3.0	?	512
IMG AXT-32-1024	December 2019	4		4/?		32			1.3	3.x	3.0	?	1024
IMG AXT-48-1536	December 2019	6		6/?		48			1.3	3.x	3.0	?	1536
IMG AXT-64-2048	December 2019	8		8/?		64			1.3	3.x	3.0	?	2048

=== IMG B-Series ===
The B-Series GPUs offer up to 25% lower die space and 30% lower power than the previous A-Series.

Model	Date	MC	SPUs	RACs	Core config	SIMD lane	Fillrate @ 1 GHz		Bus width (bit)	API (version)			GFLOPS (FP32) @ 1 GHz
Model	Date	MC	SPUs	RACs	Core config	SIMD lane	(GP/s)	(GT/s)	Bus width (bit)	Vulkan (API)	OpenGL ES	OpenCL	GFLOPS (FP32) @ 1 GHz
IMG BXE-1-16	October 2020	1			1/?		1			1.3	3.x	3.0	16
IMG BXE-2-32	October 2020	1			1/?		2			1.3	3.x	3.0	32
IMG BXE-4-32	October 2020	1			1/?		4			1.3	3.x	3.0	32
IMG BXE-4-32 MC2	October 2020	2			2/?		8			1.3	3.x	3.0	64
IMG BXE-4-32 MC3	October 2020	3			3/?		12			1.3	3.x	3.0	96
IMG BXE-4-32 MC4	October 2020	4			4/?		16			1.3	3.x	3.0	128
IMG BXM-4-64 MC1	October 2020	1			1/?		4			1.3	3.x	3.0	64
IMG BXM-4-64 MC2	October 2020	2			2/?		8			1.3	3.x	3.0	128
IMG BXM-4-64 MC3	October 2020	3			3/?		12			1.3	3.x	3.0	192
IMG BXM-4-64 MC4	October 2020	4			4/?		16			1.3	3.x	3.0	256
IMG BXM-8-256	October 2020	1	1		1/?		8			1.3	3.x	3.0	256
IMG BXS-1-16	October 2020	1					1			1.3	3.x	3.0	16
IMG BXS-2-32	October 2020	1					2			1.3	3.x	3.0	32
IMG BXS-2-32 MC2	October 2020	2					4			1.3	3.x	3.0	64
IMG BXS-4-32 MC1	October 2020	1					4			1.3	3.x	3.0	32
IMG BXS-4-32 MC2	October 2020	2					8			1.3	3.x	3.0	64
IMG BXS-4-32 MC3	October 2020	3					12			1.3	3.x	3.0	96
IMG BXS-4-32 MC4	October 2020	4					16			1.3	3.x	3.0	128
IMG BXS-4-64 MC1	October 2020	1					4			1.3	3.x	3.0	64
IMG BXS-4-64 MC2	October 2020	2					8			1.3	3.x	3.0	128
IMG BXS-4-64 MC3	October 2020	3					12			1.3	3.x	3.0	192
IMG BXS-4-64 MC4	October 2020	4					16			1.3	3.x	3.0	256
IMG BXS-8-256	October 2020	1	1				8			1.3	3.x	3.0	256
IMG BXS-16-512	October 2020	1	2				16			1.3	3.x	3.0	512
IMG BXS-32-1024 MC1	October 2020	1	4				32			1.3	3.x	3.0	1024
IMG BXS-32-1024 MC2	October 2020	2	8				64			1.3	3.x	3.0	2048
IMG BXS-32-1024 MC3	October 2020	3	12				96			1.3	3.x	3.0	3072
IMG BXS-32-1024 MC4	October 2020	4	16				128			1.3	3.x	3.0	4096
IMG BXT-16-512	October 2020	1	2		2/?		16			1.3	3.x	3.0	512
IMG BXT-32-1024 MC1	October 2020	1	4		4/?		32			1.3	3.x	3.0	1024
IMG BXT-32-1024 MC2	October 2020	2	8		8/?		64			1.3	3.x	3.0	2048
IMG BXT-32-1024 MC3	October 2020	3	12		12/?		96			1.3	3.x	3.0	3072
IMG BXT-32-1024 MC4	October 2020	4	16		16/?		128			1.3	3.x	3.0	4096

=== IMG C-Series (Photon) ===
Imagination Technologies announced on the 4th of November 2021 the new C-series GPU architecture.

Model	Date	MC	SPUs	RACs	Core config	SIMD lane	Fillrate @ 1 GHz		Bus width (bit)	API (version)			GFLOPS (FP32) @ 1 GHz
Model	Date	MC	SPUs	RACs	Core config	SIMD lane	(GP/s)	(GT/s)	Bus width (bit)	Vulkan (API)	OpenGL ES	OpenCL	GFLOPS (FP32) @ 1 GHz
IMG CXM-2-64	November 2021	1	1		1/?	32	2			1.3	3.x	3.0	64
IMG CXM-4-64	November 2021	1	1		1/?	32	4			1.3	3.x	3.0	64
IMG CXM-4-128	November 2021	1	1		2/?	64	4			1.3	3.x	3.0	128

=== IMG D-Series ===
Imagination Technologies announced on the 11th of January 2023 the new DXT GPU architecture. Imagination Technologies announced on the 7th November, 2023 the new DXD GPU architecture. Imagination Technologies announced on the 11th September, 2024 the new DXS GPU architecture. Imagination Technologies announced on the 25 February, 2025 the new DXTP GPU architecture.

Model	Date	MC	SPUs	RACs	Core config	SIMD lane	Fillrate @ 1 GHz		Bus width (bit)	API (version)				GFLOPS (FP32) @ 1 GHz
Model	Date	MC	SPUs	RACs	Core config	SIMD lane	(GP/s)	(GT/s)	Bus width (bit)	Vulkan (API)	OpenGL ES	OpenCL	Direct3D	GFLOPS (FP32) @ 1 GHz
IMG DXT-8-256	January 2023	1	1	0/0.5/1	1/1	128	8			1.3	3.x	3.0	—N/a	256
IMG DXT-48-1536	January 2023	1	2/3	1/2/3	6/6	768	48			1.3	3.x	3.0	—N/a	1536
IMG DXT-64-2048	January 2023	1	2	2/4	8/8	1024	64			1.3	3.x	3.0	—N/a	2048
IMG DXT-72-2304	January 2023	1	3	1.5/3	9/9	1152	72			1.3	3.x	3.0	—N/a	2304
IMG DXD-72-2304 MC1	November 2023	1	3	1.5/3	9/9	1152	72			1.3	3.x	3.0	FL11_0	2304
IMG DXD-72-2304 MC2	November 2023	2	6	1.5/3	18/18	2304	144			1.3	3.x	3.0	FL11_0	4608
IMG DXS-8-256	September 2024	1	1	0?	1/1	128	8			1.3	3.x	3.0	—N/a	256
IMG DXS-48-1536 MC1	September 2024	1	3	0?	6/6	768	48			1.3	3.x	3.0	—N/a	1536
IMG DXS-48-1536 MC2	September 2024	2	6	0?	12/12	1536	96			1.3	3.x	3.0	—N/a	3072
IMG DXS-48-1536 MC3	September 2024	3	9	0?	18/18	2304	144			1.3	3.x	3.0	—N/a	4608
IMG DXS-48-1536 MC4	September 2024	4	12	0?	24/24	3072	192			1.3	3.x	3.0	—N/a	6144
IMG DXTP-48-1536	February 2025	1	2/3	1/2/3	6/6	768	48			1.4	3.x	3.0	—N/a	1536
IMG DXTP-64-2048	February 2025	1	2	2/4	8/8	1024	64			1.4	3.x	3.0	—N/a	2048
IMG DXTP-72-2304	February 2025	1	3	1.5/3	9/9	1152	72			1.4	3.x	3.0	—N/a	2304

=== IMG E-Series ===
Imagination Technologies announced on the 8th May 2025 the new EXT GPU architecture.

Model	Date	MC	SPUs	RACs	Core config	SIMD lane	Fillrate @ 1 GHz		Bus width (bit)	API (version)				GFLOPS (FP32) @ 1 GHz	TOPS (INT8/FP8) @ 1 GHz
Model	Date	MC	SPUs	RACs		SIMD lane	(GP/s)	(GT/s)	Bus width (bit)	Vulkan (API)	OpenGL ES	OpenCL	Direct3D	GFLOPS (FP32) @ 1 GHz	TOPS (INT8/FP8) @ 1 GHz
IMG EXT-8-256	February 2025	1	1	0/0.5/1?	1/1	128	8			1.4	3.x	3.0	—N/a	256	2
IMG EXT-16-512	February 2025	1	1/2	0/1/2?	2/2	256	16			1.4	3.x	3.0	—N/a	512	?
IMG EXT-24-768	February 2025	1	3	0/1.5/3?	3/3	384	24			1.4	3.x	3.0	—N/a	768	?
IMG EXT-32-1024	February 2025	1	2/4	1/2?	4/4	512	32			1.4	3.x	3.0	—N/a	1024	?
IMG EXT-48-1536	February 2025	1	3	1/2/3?	6/6	768	48			1.4	3.x	3.0	—N/a	1536	?
IMG EXT-64-2048	February 2025	1	4	2/4?	8/8	1024	64			1.4	3.x	3.0	—N/a	2048	32

Notes

- All models support Tile based deferred rendering (TBDR)
- Multi-Core (MC)
- Scalable Processing Units (SPUs)
- Ray Acceleration Cluster (RAC) units

== PowerVR Vision & AI ==
=== Series2NX ===
The Series2NX family of Neural Network Accelerators (NNA) was announced on September 21, 2017.

Series2NX core options:

Model	Date	Engines	8-bit TOPS	16-bit TOPS	8-bit MACs	16-bit MACs	APIs
AX2145	September 2017	?	1	0.5	512/clk	256/clk	IMG DNN Android NN
AX2185	September 2017	8	4.1	2.0	2048/clk	1024/clk	IMG DNN Android NN

=== Series3NX ===
The Series3NX family of Neural Network Accelerators (NNA) was announced on December 4, 2018.

Series3NX core options:

Model	Date	Engines	8-bit TOPS	16-bit TOPS	8-bit MACs	16-bit MACs	APIs
AX3125	December 2018	?	0.6	?	256/clk	64/clk	IMG DNN Android NN
AX3145	December 2018	?	1.2	?	512/clk	128/clk	IMG DNN Android NN
AX3365	December 2018	?	2.0	?	1024/clk	256/clk	IMG DNN Android NN
AX3385	December 2018	?	4.0	?	2048/clk	512/clk	IMG DNN Android NN
AX3595	December 2018	?	10.0	?	4096/clk	1024/clk	IMG DNN Android NN

Series3NX multi-core options

Model	Date	Cores	8-bit TOPS	16-bit TOPS	8-bit MACs	16-bit MACs	APIs
UH2X40	December 2018	2	20.0	?	8192/clk	2048/clk	IMG DNN Android NN
UH4X40	December 2018	4	40.0	?	16384/clk	4096/clk	IMG DNN Android NN
UH8X40	December 2018	8	80.0	?	32768/clk	8192/clk	IMG DNN Android NN
UH16X40	December 2018	16	160.0	?	65536/clk	16384/clk	IMG DNN Android NN

==== Series3NX-F ====
The Series3NX-F family of Neural Network Accelerators (NNA) was announced alongside the Series3NX family. The Series3NX-F family combines the Series 3NX with a Rogue-based GPGPU (NNPU), and local RAM. This allows support for programmability and floating-point.

== Implementations ==
The PowerVR GPU variants can be found in the following table of systems on chips (SoC). Implementations of PowerVR accelerators in products are listed here.

Vendor	Date	SOC name	PowerVR chipset	Frequency	GFLOPS (FP16)
Texas Instruments		OMAP 3420	SGX530	?	?
Texas Instruments		OMAP 3430	SGX530	?	?
Texas Instruments		OMAP 3440	SGX530	?	?
Texas Instruments		OMAP 3450	SGX530	?	?
Texas Instruments		OMAP 3515	SGX530	?	?
Texas Instruments		OMAP 3517	SGX530	?	?
Texas Instruments		OMAP 3530	SGX530	110 MHz	0.88
Texas Instruments		OMAP 3620	SGX530	?	?
Texas Instruments		OMAP 3621	SGX530	?	?
Texas Instruments		OMAP 3630	SGX530	?	?
Texas Instruments		OMAP 3640	SGX530	?	?
Texas Instruments		Sitara AM335x	SGX530	200 MHz	1.6
Texas Instruments		Sitara AM3715	SGX530	?	?
Texas Instruments		Sitara AM3891	SGX530	?	?
Texas Instruments		DaVinci DM3730	SGX530	200 MHz	1.6
Texas Instruments		Integra C6A8168	SGX530	?	?
NEC		EMMA Mobile/EV2	SGX530	?	?
Renesas		SH-Mobile G3	SGX530	?	?
Renesas		SH-Navi3 (SH7776)	SGX530	?	?
Sigma Designs		SMP8656	SGX530	?	?
Sigma Designs		SMP8910	SGX530	?	?
MediaTek		MT6513	SGX531	281 MHz	2.25
MediaTek	2010	MT6573	SGX531	281 MHz	2.25
MediaTek	2012	MT6575M	SGX531	281 MHz	2.25
Trident		PNX8481	SGX531	?	?
Trident		PNX8491	SGX531	?	?
Trident		HiDTV PRO-SX5	SGX531	?	?
MediaTek		MT6515	SGX531	522 MHz	4.2
MediaTek	2011	MT6575	SGX531	522 MHz	4.2
MediaTek		MT6517	SGX531	522 MHz	4.2
MediaTek		MT6517T	SGX531	522 MHz	4.2
MediaTek	2012	MT6577	SGX531	522 MHz	4.2
MediaTek		MT6577T	SGX531	522 MHz	4.2
MediaTek		MT8317	SGX531	522 MHz	4.2
MediaTek		MT8317T	SGX531	522 MHz	4.2
MediaTek		MT8377	SGX531	522 MHz	4.2
NEC		NaviEngine EC-4260	SGX535	?	?
NEC		NaviEngine EC-4270	SGX535	?	?
Intel		CE 3100 (Canmore)	SGX535	?	?
Intel		SCH US15/W/L (Poulsbo)	SGX535	?	?
Intel		CE4100 (Sodaville)	SGX535	?	?
Intel		CE4110 (Sodaville)	SGX535	200 MHz	1.6
Intel		CE4130 (Sodaville)	SGX535	200 MHz	1.6
Intel		CE4150 (Sodaville)	SGX535	400 MHz	3.2
Intel		CE4170 (Sodaville)	SGX535	400 MHz	3.2
Intel		CE4200 (Groveland)	SGX535	400 MHz	3.2
Samsung		APL0298C05	SGX535	?	?
Apple	April 3, 2010	Apple A4 (iPhone 4)	SGX535	200 MHz	1.6
Apple	April 3, 2010	Apple A4 (iPad)	SGX535	250 MHz	2.0
Ambarella		iOne	SGX540	?	?
Renesas		SH-Mobile G4	SGX540	?	?
Renesas		SH-Mobile APE4 (R8A73720)	SGX540	?	?
Renesas		R-Car E2 (R8A7794)	SGX540	?	?
Ingenic Semiconductor		JZ4780	SGX540	?	?
Samsung	2010	Exynos 3110	SGX540	200 MHz	3.2
Samsung	2010	S5PC110	SGX540	200 MHz	3.2
Samsung		S5PC111	SGX540	200 MHz	3.2
Samsung		S5PV210	SGX540	?	?
Texas Instruments	Q1 2011	OMAP 4430	SGX540	307 MHz	4.9
Texas Instruments	Q1 2011	OMAP 4460	SGX540	384 MHz	6.1
Intel	Q1 2013	Atom Z2420	SGX540	400 MHz	6.4
Actions Semiconductor		ATM7021	SGX540	500 MHz	8.0
Actions Semiconductor		ATM7021A	SGX540	500 MHz	8.0
Actions Semiconductor		ATM7029B	SGX540	500 MHz	8.0
Rockchip		RK3168	SGX540	600 MHz	9.6
Apple	November 13, 2014	Apple S1 (Apple Watch (1st generation))	SGX543	?	?
Apple	March 11, 2011	Apple A5 (iPhone 4S, iPod Touch (5th generation))	SGX543 MP2	200 MHz	12.8
Apple	March 2012	Apple A5 (iPad 2, iPad mini)	SGX543 MP2	250 MHz	16.0
MediaTek		MT5327	SGX543 MP2	400 MHz	25.6
Renesas		R-Car H1 (R8A77790)	SGX543 MP2	?	?
Apple	September 12, 2012	Apple A6 (iPhone 5, iPhone 5C)	SGX543 MP3	250 MHz	24.0
Apple	March 7, 2012	Apple A5X (iPad (3rd generation))	SGX543 MP4	250 MHz	32.0
Sony		CXD53155GG (PS Vita)	SGX543 MP4+	41-222 MHz	5.248-28.416
ST-Ericsson		Nova A9540	SGX544	?	?
		NovaThor L9540	SGX544	?	?
		NovaThor L8540	SGX544	500 MHz	16
		NovaThor L8580	SGX544	600 MHz	19.2
MediaTek	July 2013	MT6589M	SGX544	156 MHz	5
MediaTek		MT8117	SGX544	156 MHz	5
MediaTek		MT8121	SGX544	156 MHz	5
MediaTek	March 2013	MT6589	SGX544	286 MHz	9.2
MediaTek		MT8389	SGX544	286 MHz	9.2
MediaTek		MT8125	SGX544	300 MHz	9.6
MediaTek	July 2013	MT6589T	SGX544	357 MHz	11.4
Texas Instruments	Q2 2012	OMAP 4470	SGX544	384 MHz	13.8
Broadcom		Broadcom M320	SGX544	?	?
Broadcom		Broadcom M340	SGX544	?	?
Actions Semiconductor		ATM7039	SGX544	450 MHz	16.2
Allwinner		Allwinner A31	SGX544 MP2	300 MHz	19.2
Allwinner		Allwinner A31S	SGX544 MP2	300 MHz	19.2
Intel	Q2 2013	Atom Z2520	SGX544 MP2	300 MHz	21.6
Intel	Q2 2013	Atom Z2560	SGX544 MP2	400 MHz	25.6
Intel	Q2 2013	Atom Z2580	SGX544 MP2	533 MHz	34.1
Texas Instruments	Q2 2013	OMAP 5430	SGX544 MP2	533 MHz	34.1
Texas Instruments	Q2 2013	OMAP 5432	SGX544 MP2	533 MHz	34.1
Texas Instruments	Q4 2018	Sitara AM6528; Sitara AM6548	SGX544		
Allwinner		Allwinner A83T	SGX544 MP2	700 MHz	44.8
Allwinner		Allwinner H8	SGX544 MP2	700 MHz	44.8
Samsung	Q2 2013	Exynos 5410	SGX544 MP3	533 MHz	51.1
Intel		Atom Z2460	SGX545	533 MHz	8.5
Intel		Atom Z2760	SGX545	533 MHz	8.5
Intel		Atom CE5310	SGX545	?	?
Intel		Atom CE5315	SGX545	?	?
Intel		Atom CE5318	SGX545	?	?
Intel		Atom CE5320	SGX545	?	?
Intel		Atom CE5328	SGX545	?	?
Intel		Atom CE5335	SGX545	?	?
Intel		Atom CE5338	SGX545	?	?
Intel		Atom CE5343	SGX545	?	?
Intel		Atom CE5348	SGX545	?	?
Apple	October 23, 2012	Apple A6X (iPad (4th generation))	SGX554 MP4	300 MHz	76.8
Apple	September, 2016	Apple S1P (Apple Watch Series 1), Apple S2 (Apple Watch Series 2)	Series6 (G6050 ?)	?	?
Rockchip		RK3368	G6110	600 MHz	38.4
MediaTek	Q1 2014	MT6595M	G6200 (2 Clusters)	450 MHz	57.6
MediaTek		MT8135	G6200 (2 Clusters)	450 MHz	57.6
MediaTek	Q4 2014	Helio X10 (MT6795M)	G6200 (2 Clusters)	550 MHz	70.4
MediaTek	Q4 2014	Helio X10 (MT6795T)	G6200 (2 Clusters)		
MediaTek	Q1 2014	MT6595	G6200 (2 Clusters)	600 MHz	76.8
MediaTek	Q1 2014	MT6795	G6200 (2 Clusters)	700 MHz	89.5
LG	Q1 2012	LG H13	G6200 (2 Clusters)	600 MHz	76.8
Allwinner		Allwinner A80	G6230 (2 Clusters)	533 MHz	68.0
Allwinner		Allwinner A80T	G6230 (2 Clusters)	533 MHz	68.0
Actions Semiconductor		ATM9009	G6230 (2 Clusters)	600 MHz	76.8
MediaTek	Q1 2015	MT8173	GX6250 (2 Clusters)	700 MHz	89.6
MediaTek	Q1 2016	MT8176	GX6250 (2 Clusters)	600 MHz	76.8
Intel	Q1 2014	Atom Z3460	G6400 (4 Clusters)	533 MHz	136.4
Intel	Q1 2014	Atom Z3480	G6400 (4 Clusters)	533 MHz	136.4
Renesas		R-Car H2 (R8A7790x)	G6400 (4 Clusters)	600 MHz	153.6
Renesas		R-Car H3 (R8A7795)	GX6650 (6 Clusters)	600 MHz	230.4
Apple	September 10, 2013	Apple A7 (iPhone 5S, iPad Air, iPad mini 2, iPad mini 3)	G6430 (4 Clusters)	450 MHz	115.2
Intel	Q2 2014	Atom Z3530	G6430 (4 Clusters)	457 MHz	117
Intel	Q2 2014	Atom Z3560	G6430 (4 Clusters)	533 MHz	136.4
Intel	Q3 2014	Atom Z3570	G6430 (4 Clusters)	533 MHz	136.4
Intel	Q2 2014	Atom Z3580	G6430 (4 Clusters)	533 MHz	136.4
Apple	September 9, 2014	Apple A8 (iPhone 6 / 6 Plus, iPad mini 4, Apple TV HD, iPod Touch (6th generation))	GX6450 (4 Clusters)	533 MHz	136.4
Apple	October 16, 2014	Apple A8X (iPad Air 2)	GX6850 (8 Clusters)	533 MHz	272.9
Apple	September 9, 2015	Apple A9 (iPhone 6S / 6S Plus, iPhone SE (1st generation), iPad (5th generation))	Series7XT GT7600 (6 Clusters)	600 MHz	230.4
Apple	September 9, 2015	Apple A9X (iPad Pro (9.7-inch), iPad Pro (12.9-inch))	Series7XT GT7800 (12 Clusters)	>652 MHz	>500
Apple	September 7, 2016	Apple A10 Fusion (iPhone 7 / 7 Plus & iPad (6th generation))	Series7XT GT7600 Plus (6 Clusters)	900 MHz	345.6
Spreadtrum	2017	SC9861G-IA	Series7XT GT7200		
MediaTek	Q1 2017	Helio X30 (MT6799)	Series7XT GT7400 Plus (4 Clusters)	800 MHz	204.8
Apple	June 5, 2017	Apple A10X (iPad Pro (10.5-inch), iPad Pro (12.9-inch) (2nd generation), Apple TV 4K)	Series7XT GT7600 Plus (12 Clusters)	>912 MHz	>700
Socionext	2017	SC1810	Series8XE		
Synaptics	2017	Videosmart VS-550 (Berlin BG5CT)	Series8XE GE8310		
Mediatek	2017	MT6739	Series8XE GE8100		
Mediatek	2017	MT8167	Series8XE GE8300		
Mediatek	2018	Helio A20 (MT6761D)	Series8XE GE8300		
Mediatek	2018	Helio P22 (MT6762)	Series8XE GE8320		
Mediatek	2018	Helio A22 (MT6762M)	Series8XE GE8320		
Mediatek	2018	Helio P35 (MT6765)	Series8XE GE8320		
Mediatek	2019	MT6731	Series8XE GE8100		
Mediatek	2020	Helio A25	Series8XE GE8320		
Mediatek	2020	Helio G25	Series8XE GE8320		
Mediatek	2020	Helio G35	Series8XE GE8320		
Mediatek	2022	Dimensity 930 (MT6855)	IMG BXM-8-256	950 MHz	259.2
	2023	Dimensity 7020	IMG BXM-8-256		
Texas Instruments	2020	TDA4VM	Series8 GE8430		
Texas Instruments	2023	AM69	IMG BXS-4-64	800MHz	50
Renesas	2017	R-Car D3 (R8A77995)	Series8XE GE8300		
Unisoc (Spreadtrum)	2018	SC9863A	Series8XE GE8322		
Unisoc (Spreadtrum)	Q1 2019	Tiger T310	Series8XE GE8300		
Unisoc (Spreadtrum)	Q3 2019	Tiger T710	Series9XM GM9446		
Unisoc (Spreadtrum)	Q1 2020	Tiger T7510	Series9XM GM9446		
Mediatek	2018	Helio P90	Series9XM GM9446		
Mediatek	Q1 2020	Helio P95	Series9XM GM9446		
Synaptics	Q1 2020	Videosmart VS680	Series9XE GE9920		
Semidrive	Q2 2020	X9, G9, V9	Series9XM		
StarFive	2022	JH-7110	IMG BXE-4-32 MC1	400-600MHz	
Alibaba	2022	TH1520	IMG BXM-4-64	800MHz	
SpacemiT	2024	K1	IMG BXE-2-32	819MHz	
SpacemiT	2026	K3	IMG BXM-4-64 MC1	409-1228MHz	
Google	Q3 2025	Tensor G5	IMG DXT-48-1536	1100 MHz	

== See also ==
- List of products featuring PowerVR accelerators
- Adreno – GPU developed by Qualcomm
- Mali – available as SIP block to 3rd parties
- Vivante – available as SIP block to 3rd parties
- Tegra – family of SoCs for mobile computers, the graphics core could be available as SIP block to 3rd parties
- VideoCore – family of SOCs, by Broadcom, for mobile computers, the graphics core could be available as SIP block to 3rd parties
- Atom family of SoCs – with Intel graphics core, not licensed to 3rd parties
- AMD mobile APUs – with AMD graphics core, not licensed to 3rd parties
