= LG Q60 =

2019 Android phablet manufactured by LG Electronics

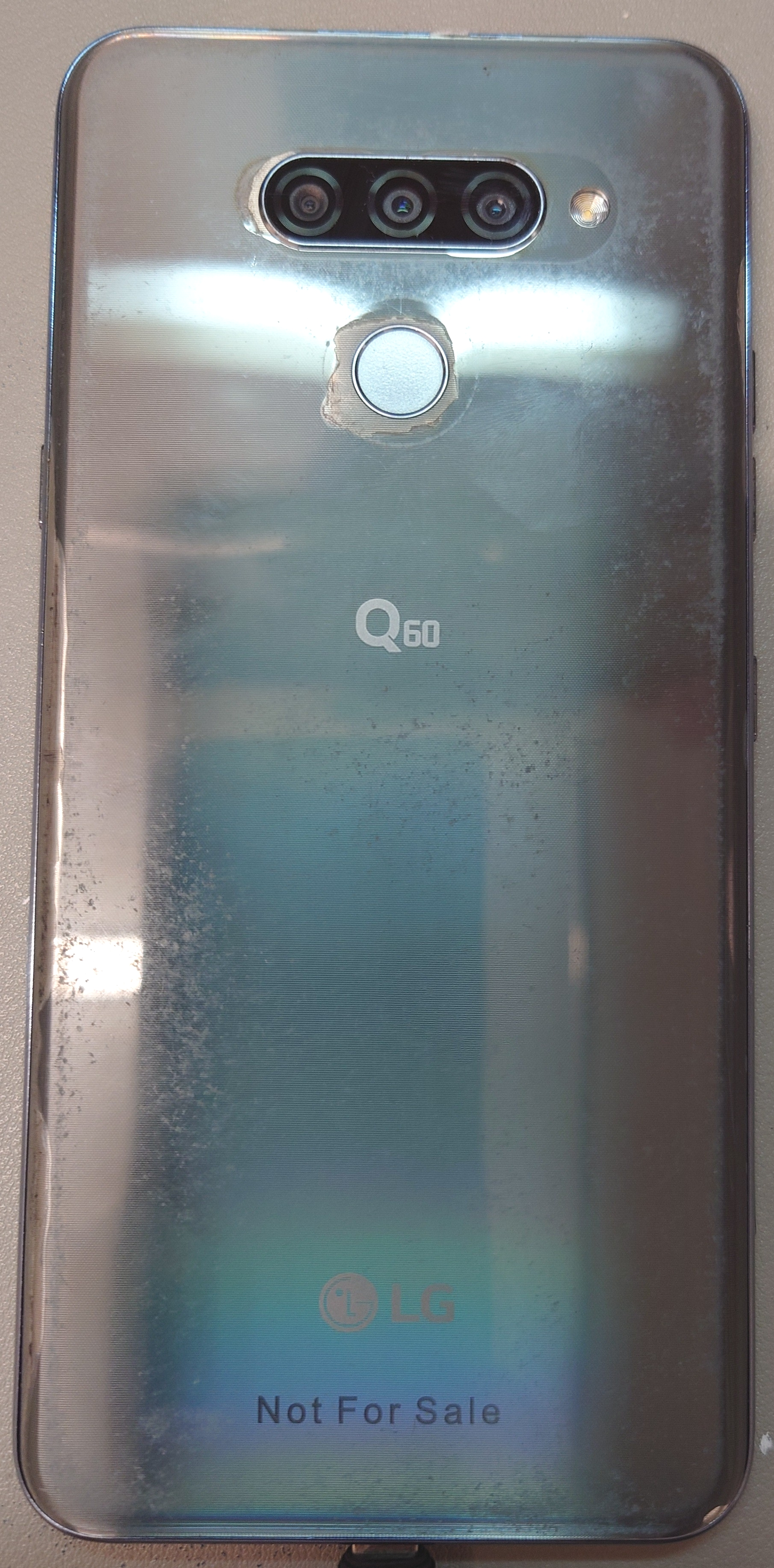
- Back side of the LG Q60, with an unreleased silver color with a "Not For Sale" label printed on the back plastic
- Brand: Q series
- Manufacturer: LG Electronics
- Type: Smartphone
- First released: 20 February 2019; 7 years ago
- Predecessor: LG Q6; LG Q7
- Successor: LG Q61
- Related: LG K50; LG K40; LG Q70
- Compatible networks: 2G GSM – 850, 900, 1800, 1900 MHz, SIM 1 and SIM 2; 3G HSDPA – 850, 900, 1900, 2100 MHz; 4G LTE - 1, 3, 7, 8, 20, 38
- Form factor: Slate
- Dimensions: 161.3 mm (6.35 in) x 77 mm (3.0 in) x 8.7 mm (0.34 in)
- Weight: 172 g (6.1 oz)
- Operating system: Original: Android 9 with LG UX 8.0; Current: Android 10 with LG UX 9.0
- System-on-chip: MediaTek Helio P22; MT6762
- CPU: Octa-core; 2.0 GHz Cortex-A53
- GPU: 650 MHz PowerVR GE8320
- Memory: 3 GB of RAM
- Storage: 64 GB of internal storage
- Removable storage: microSDXC, expandable up to 2 TB
- SIM: nanoSIM
- Battery: Non-removable lithium polymer 3500 mAh battery
- Rear camera: 16 MP (standard), f/2.0, 26mm, with PDAF 5 MP (wide), f/2.2, 13mm 2 MP (depth), f/2.4 LED flash, panorama, HDR 1080p@30fps recording
- Front camera: 13 MP, 1/3.1", 1.12μm 1080p@30fps recording
- Display: IPS LCD capacitive touchscreen, 6.26 in (159 mm), 720 × 1520 720p, (19:9 aspect ratio, ~269 ppi density)
- Sound: Mono speakers, 3.5mm headphone jack
- Connectivity: Wi-Fi 802.11 a/b/g/n/ac, dual-band, Wi-Fi Direct, DLNA, hotspot, Bluetooth 5.0, A2DP, LE, dual-band A-GPS, GLONASS
- Model: LMX525BAW, LMX525EAW, LMX525HA, LMX525WA, LMX525PR, LMX525ZA, LMX525ZAW
- Other: MIL-STD-810G compliant, fingerprint (rear-mounted), accelerometer, proximity, compass

LG Q60 is a mid-range Android smartphone manufactured by LG Electronics, announced and released in February 2019, along with the LG K50 and LG K60, and a part of the LG Q series phones lineup. The phone was praised by some reviewers for its cheap price and AI-powered triple camera set-up.

Despite the initial reviews, the device received poor reviews from its users, who had high expectations for the device that was marketed as "premium" by LG. Reviews of the product cited the poor camera quality despite the presence of the triple camera set-up; many also noted the poor signal reception of the device, presumably due to the limited band support. Some reviewers also complained about the disappointingly slow Wi-Fi connection speeds.

== Specifications ==
=== Design ===
The LG Q60 follows many footsteps in the design of its flagship counterpart, the LG G8 ThinQ, featuring a metal body construction, topped with curved 2.5D glass and a notch cut-out on the display, and shares a similar combinations of buttons, with the inclusion of a Google Assistant button. However, the device has a triple card slot design with two physical openings for a SIM card tray. It is available in New Moroccan Blue and Aurora Black, while prototypes of the device also came in an unreleased silver color.

=== Hardware ===
Internally, the LG Q60 uses the MediaTek MT6762 Helio P22 processor with the PowerVR GE8320 GPU. Only one configuration was available, which gave the device 3 GB of RAM and 64 GB of storage. It also sports three rear cameras - a key selling point - allowing for photos with different prospective be taken. The device is powered by a 3,500mAh.

=== Software ===
The LG Q60 is preloaded with LG UX 8.0 based on Android 9. It was later updated to LG UX 9.0 based on Android 10 for devices in select regions.
