= LG Q61 =

2020 smartphone model

- Brand: LG
- Manufacturer: LG Electronics
- Type: Smartphone
- Series: LG Q series
- First released: May 21, 2020 (South Korea)
- Availability by region: May 29, 2020
- Discontinued: Yes
- Predecessor: LG Q60
- Compatible networks: GSM, HSPA, LTE
- Form factor: Slate
- Color: White
- Dimensions: 164.5 mm (6.48 in) H 77.5 mm (3.05 in) W 8.3 mm (0.33 in) D
- Operating system: Android 9.0 (Pie)
- System-on-chip: MediaTek MT6765 Helio P35 (12 nm)
- CPU: Octa-core (4x2.3 GHz Cortex-A53 & 4x1.8 GHz Cortex-A53)
- GPU: PowerVR GE8320
- Memory: 4 GB RAM
- Storage: 64 GB eMMC 5.1
- Removable storage: microSDXC (dedicated slot)
- SIM: Nano-SIM
- Battery: Non-removable Li-Po 4000 mAh
- Rear camera: Quad: 48 MP, f/1.8 (wide), PDAF; 8 MP, f/2.2 (ultrawide); 2 MP, f/2.4 (macro); 5 MP, f/2.4 (depth); LED flash, panorama, HDR
- Front camera: 16 MP
- Display: 6.53 in (166 mm) IPS LCD; 1080 x 2340 pixels, 19.5:9 ratio (~395 ppi density)
- Sound: DTS:X 3D Surround Sound
- Model: LM-Q630N
- Other: Durability enhancement: MIL-STD-810G (military-grade)

The LG Q61 is an entry-level Android smartphone manufactured, designed and marketed by LG Electronics as part of the Q series. Unveiled on May 21, 2020, it was released eight days later in South Korea, featuring a MIL-STD-810G military-grade durability and enhanced 7.1-channel with DTS:X 3D Surround Sound.

== Design ==
The LG Q61 is built with an emphasis on rugged durability while maintaining a modern mid-range aesthetic. It features physical dimensions of 164.5 x 77.5 x 8.4 mm and carries a total weight of 191 grams. A defining characteristic of the device's build quality is its strict compliance with the MIL-STD-810G military standard, certifying a level of resistance against drop damage and environmental stressors.

The front of the smartphone is dominated by a modern hole-punch display design, positioning the front-facing camera in a small cutout to maximize screen area. The physical interface includes a rear-mounted fingerprint scanner for biometric security, alongside a dedicated physical button on the frame to instantly trigger Google Assistant. The smartphone was officially launched in a singular White color variant.

== Specifications ==
=== Hardware and display ===
The device is equipped with a 6.5-inch FHD+ Hole-In IPS LCD screen that utilizes a 19.5:9 aspect ratio and outputs a crisp resolution of 2340 x 1080 pixels. Under the hood, the LG Q61 runs on a 12-nanometer MediaTek Helio P35 (MT6765) octa-core processor (with components made of 4x 2.3 GHz Cortex-A53 & 4x 1.8 GHz Cortex-A53) clocked at 2.3GHz, which is paired with an IMG PowerVR GE8320 graphics processing unit. It comes configured with 4GB of RAM and 64GB of internal storage, which can be expanded up to an additional 2TB via a dedicated microSD card slot. The device houses a li-po 4,000mAh battery.

=== Camera and audio ===
For photography, the smartphone features a rear-facing quad-camera array supported by an integrated LED flash. This camera system consists of a 48-megapixel primary sensor, an 8-megapixel ultra-wide lens, a 2-megapixel macro sensor for close-up photography, and a 5-megapixel depth sensor to assist with portrait effects. Selfies and video calls are handled by a single 16-megapixel front-facing camera. On the audio side, the phone includes a standard 3.5mm headphone jack and features DTS:X 3D Surround Sound technology.

=== Connectivity and software ===
Out of the box, the smartphone runs on the Android 10 operating system. The LG Q61 supports dual SIM cards and offers broad cellular compatibility with 4G VoLTE capabilities. Wireless connectivity features include dual-band Wi-Fi 802.11 ac operating on both 2.4GHz and 5GHz frequencies, Bluetooth 5.0, Near Field Communication (NFC), and universal USB Type-C for charging and data transfer. Satellite positioning navigation is covered by built-in GPS and GLONASS systems.
