= Apple S1 =

System-in-package in Apple Watch

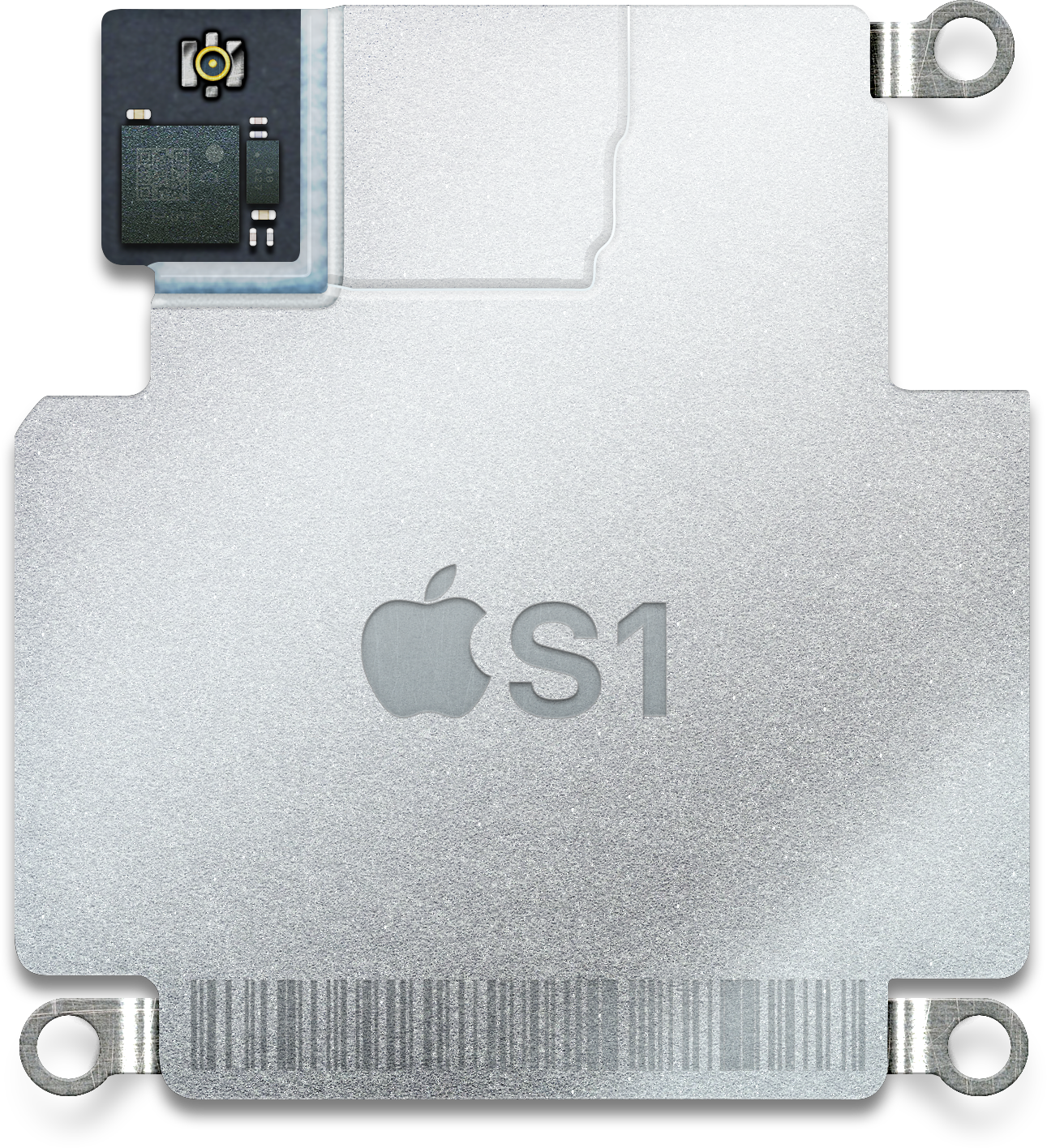
- The S1 integrated computer, 2.5 cm wide

General information
- Launched: 13 November 2014
- Discontinued: 7 September 2016
- Designed by: Apple Inc.
- Common manufacturer: Samsung
- Product code: APL0778

Performance
- Max. CPU clock rate: 520 MHz

Physical specifications
- Cores: 1
- GPU: PowerVR SGX543

Cache
- L1 cache: 32 KB data
- L2 cache: 256 KB

Architecture and classification
- Application: Apple Watch
- Technology node: 28 nm
- Instruction set: ARMv7-A

Products, models, variants
- Variant: Apple S1P

History
- Successor: Apple S2

Apple S1P
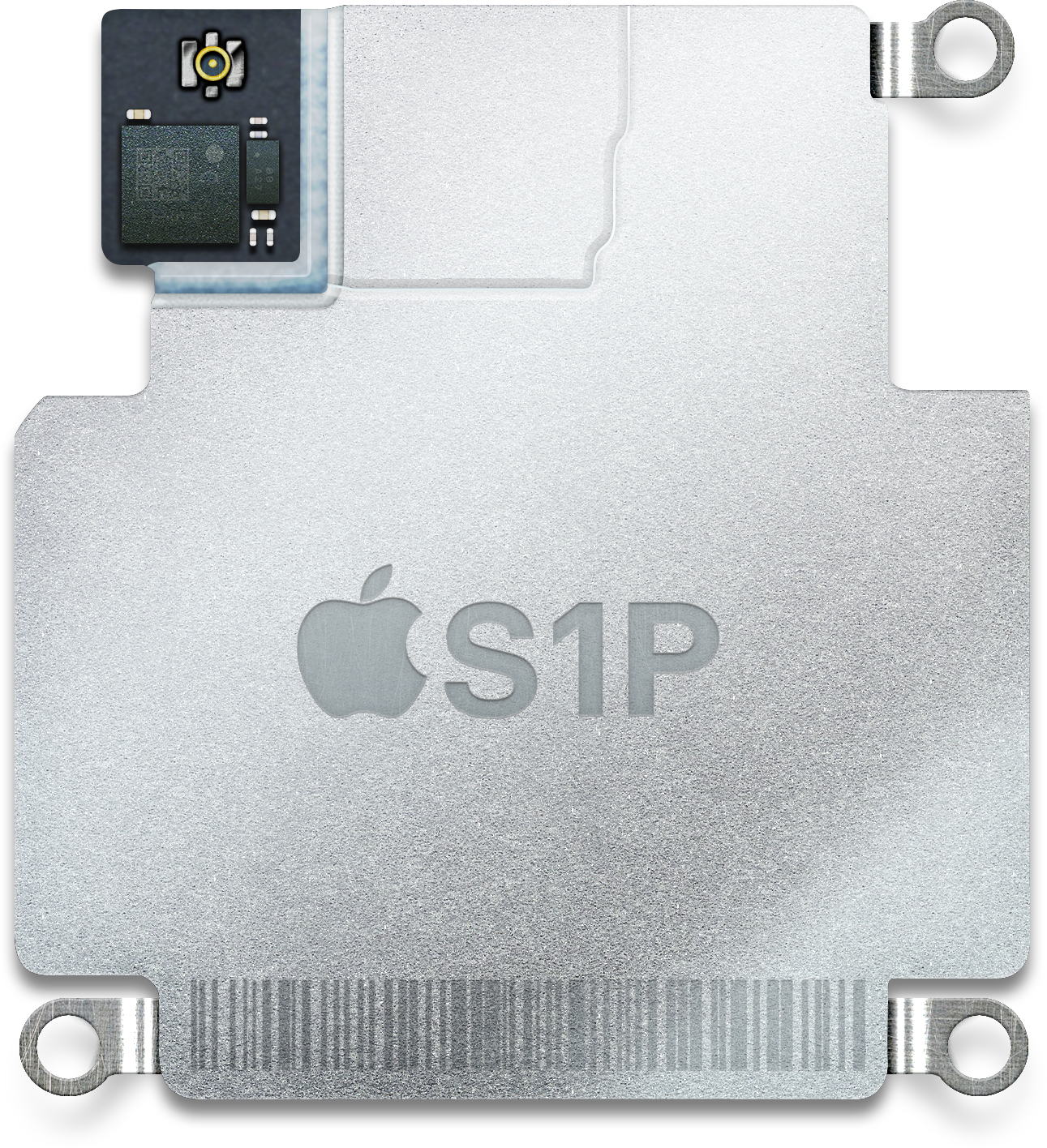

General information
- Launched: September, 2016
- Discontinued: September, 2018
- Designed by: Apple Inc.

Performance
- Max. CPU clock rate: 520 MHz

Physical specifications
- Cores: 2
- GPU: PowerVR Series 6 'Rogue'

Architecture and classification
- Application: Apple Watch Series 1
- Microarchitecture: ARMv7-A compatible
- Instruction set: ARM

History
- Predecessor: Apple S1

The Apple S1 is a system in package (SiP) processor developed and marketed by Apple Inc., part of the Apple silicon series. It is the integrated computer in the first-generation Apple Watch, utilizing a single core. Samsung is said to be the main supplier of key components, such as the RAM and NAND flash storage, as well as the assembly itself, but some teardowns saw RAM and flash memory from Toshiba and Micron Technology.

An updated dual-core version of the S1, the S1P, was released in 2016 for the Apple Watch Series 1.

== System-in-Package design ==
It uses a customized application processor that together with memory, storage and support processors for wireless connectivity, sensors and I/O constitute a complete computer in a single package. This package is filled with resin for durability.

=== Components ===
From reverse engineering, the processor handling the Wi-Fi and Bluetooth is a Broadcom BCM43342 and the six-axis gyroscope is from STMicroelectronics.

- Apple designed 32-bit ARMv7 based application processor APL0778 as the central processing unit (CPU), with an integrated PowerVR SGX543 graphics processing unit (GPU).
- 512 MB DRAM from Elpida, wire bonded on top of the APL0778 CPU
- NFC controller from NXP
- NFC booster chip from AMS
- 8 GB flash from SanDisk and Toshiba
- Wireless charging chip from IDT
- Touch controller from ADI
- Integrated gyro/accelerometer from STMicroelectronics
- BCM43342 Wi-Fi/FM/BT combo chip from Broadcom
- Power management unit (PMU) from Dialog Semiconductor

=== S1P ===
The SiP in Apple Watch Series 1 is called S1P and looks superficially identical to the S1, but in reality is an S2 minus the on-chip GPS functionality. It contains the same dual-core CPU with the same new GPU capabilities as the S2 making it about 50% faster than the S1.

== Announcement ==
The S1 was announced on 9 September 2014 as part of the "Wish we could say more" event.

The S1P was announced on 7 September 2016 as part of the "See you on the 7th" event.

== Launch date ==
The S1 made its first appearance within the Apple Watch, which arrived in April 2015. The S1 was discontinued with the launch of Apple Watch Series 1, containing the S1P.

The S1P was released with the Apple Watch Series 1 on 16 September 2016.

== Images ==
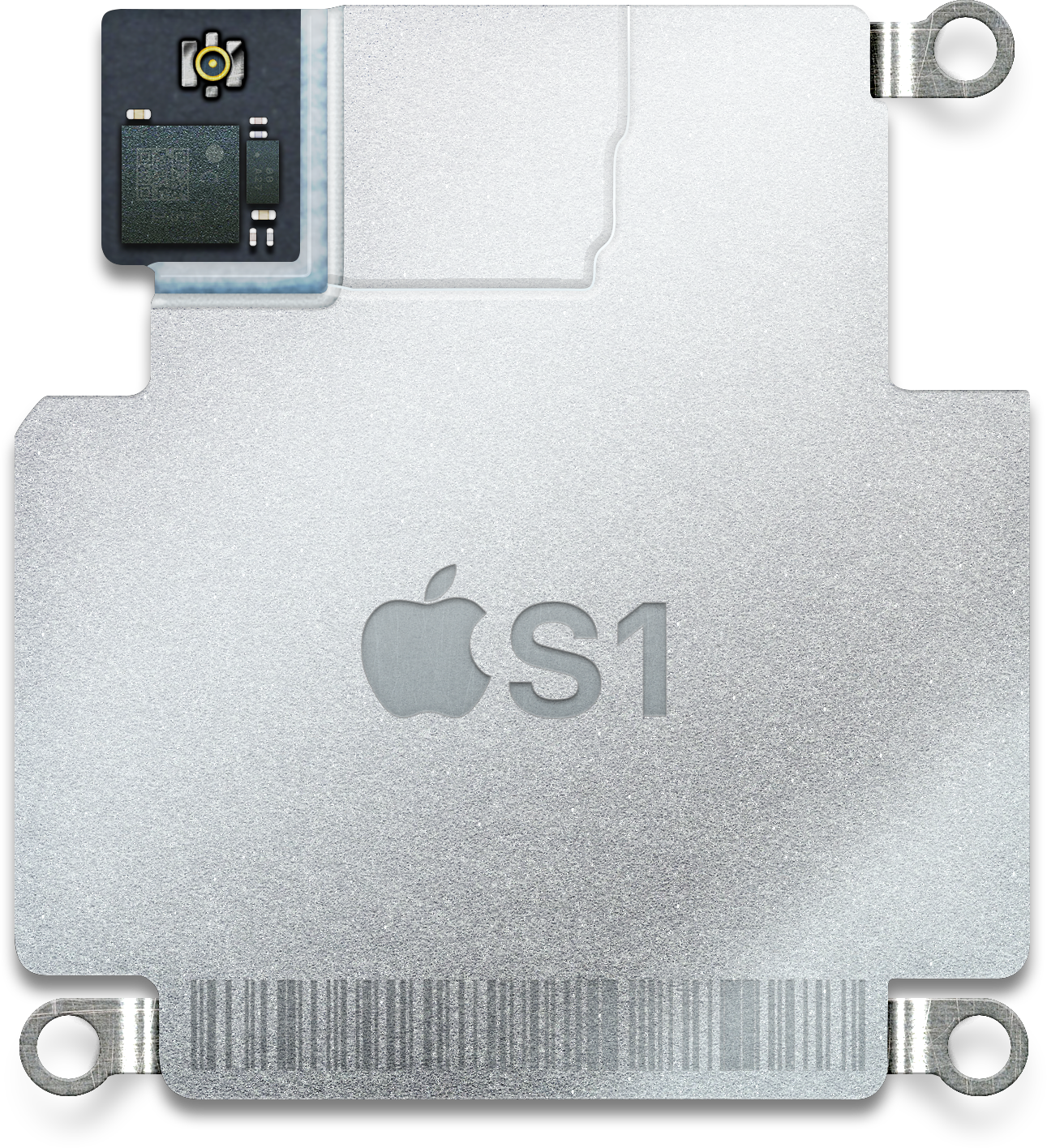
An illustration of the encapsulated S1 package

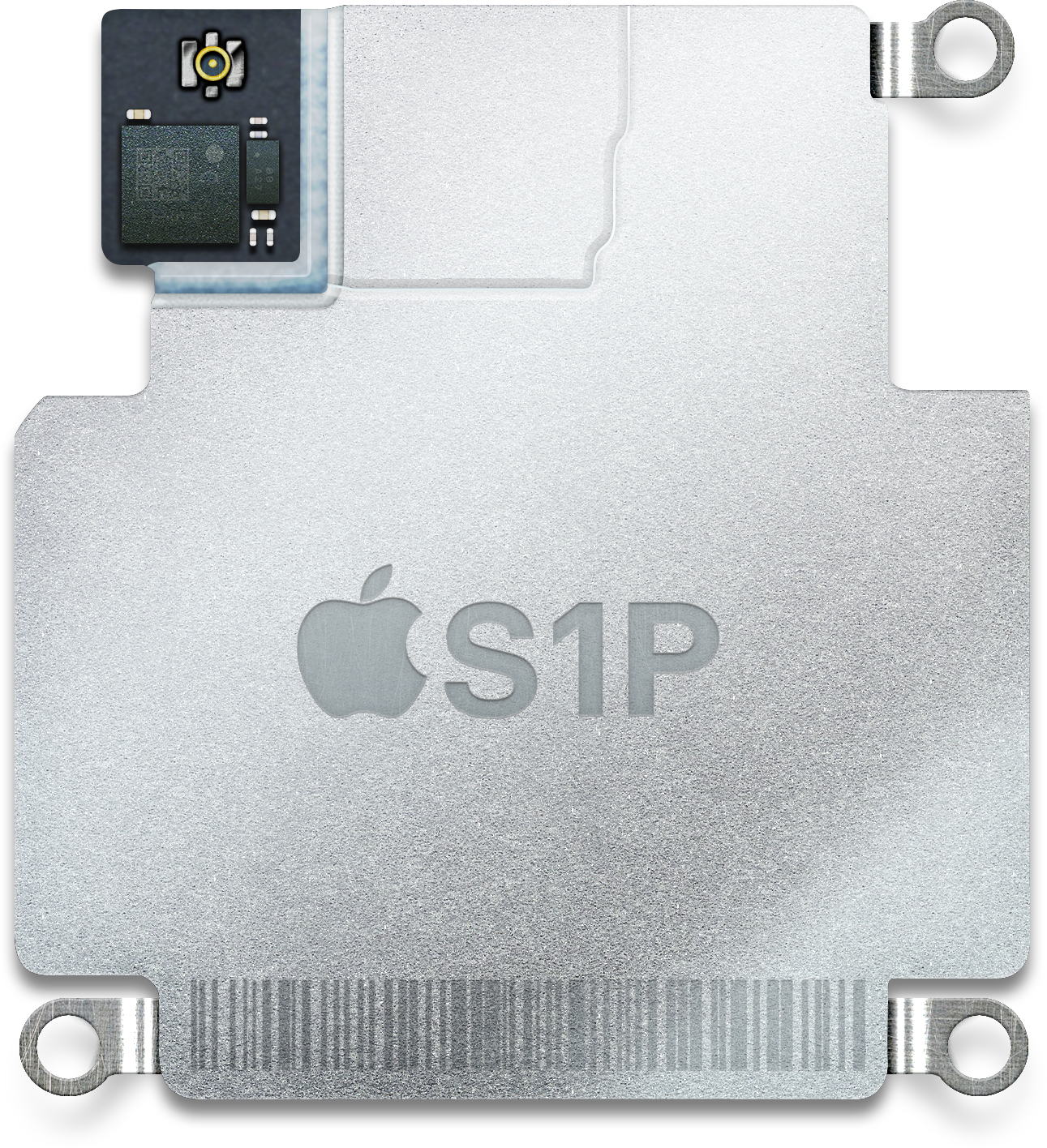
The S1P package shows little of the differences that's encapsulated inside.

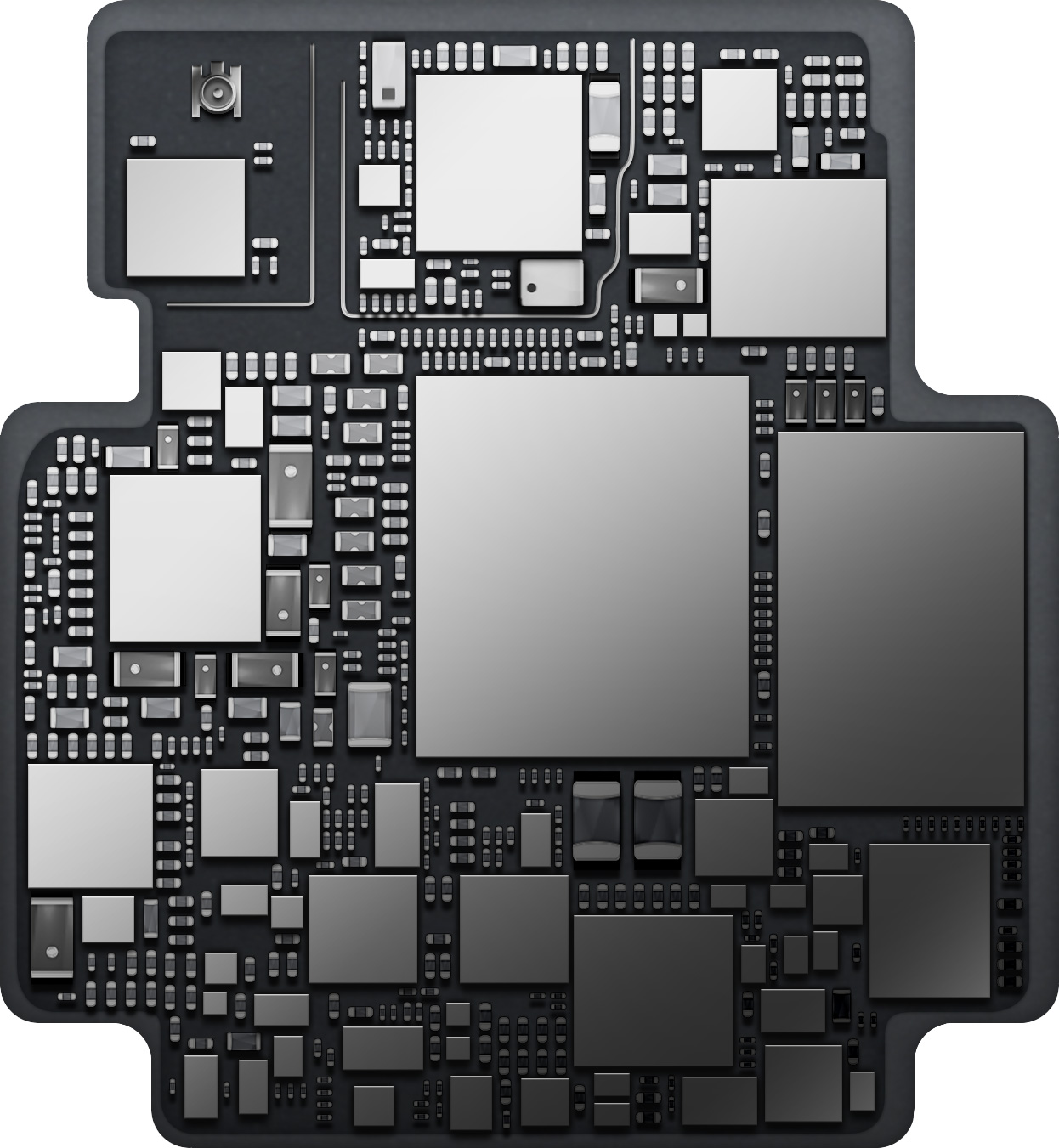
This illustration shows the positions of the chips and other components inside the S1 package.

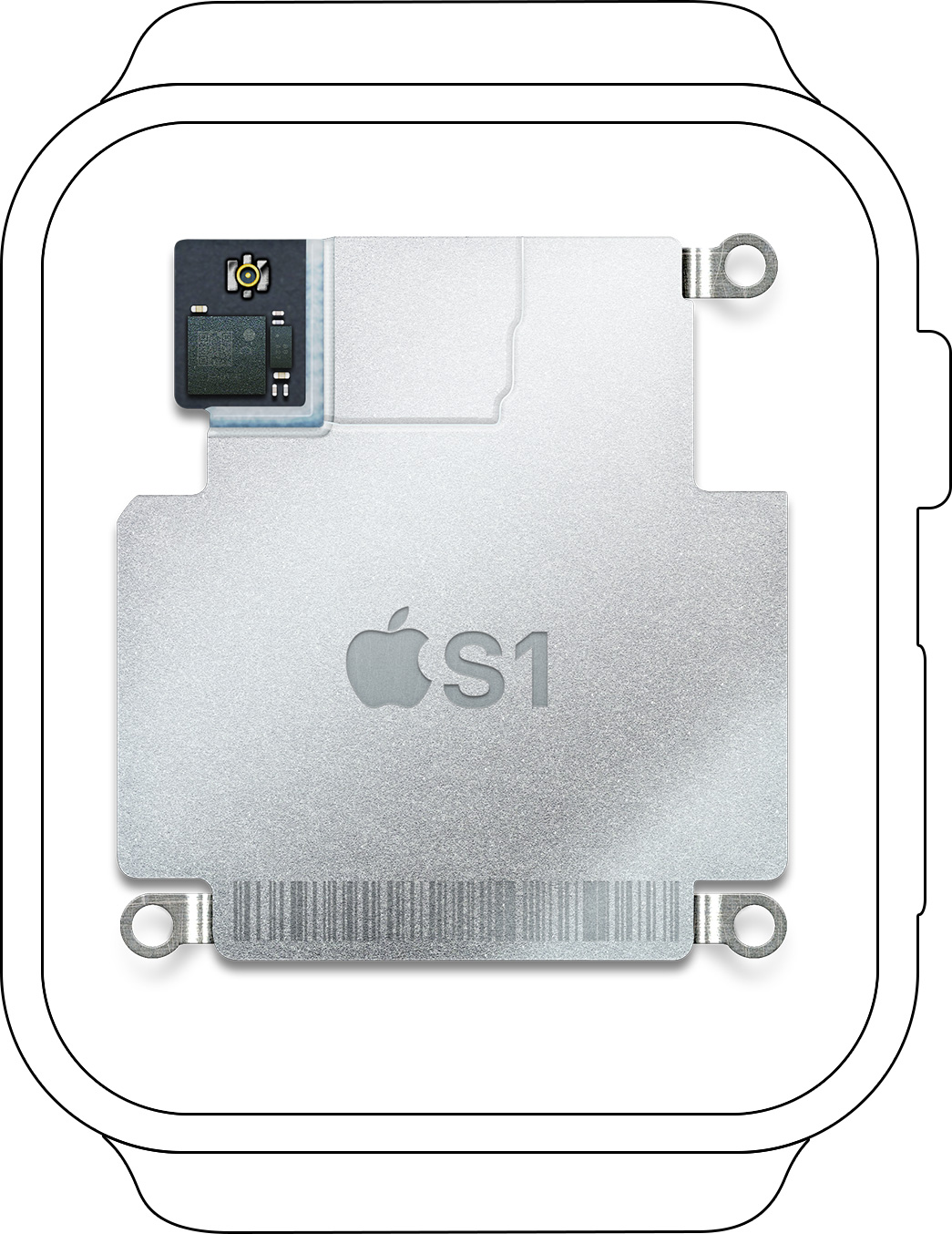
This is how large the S1 is compared to the Apple Watch case.

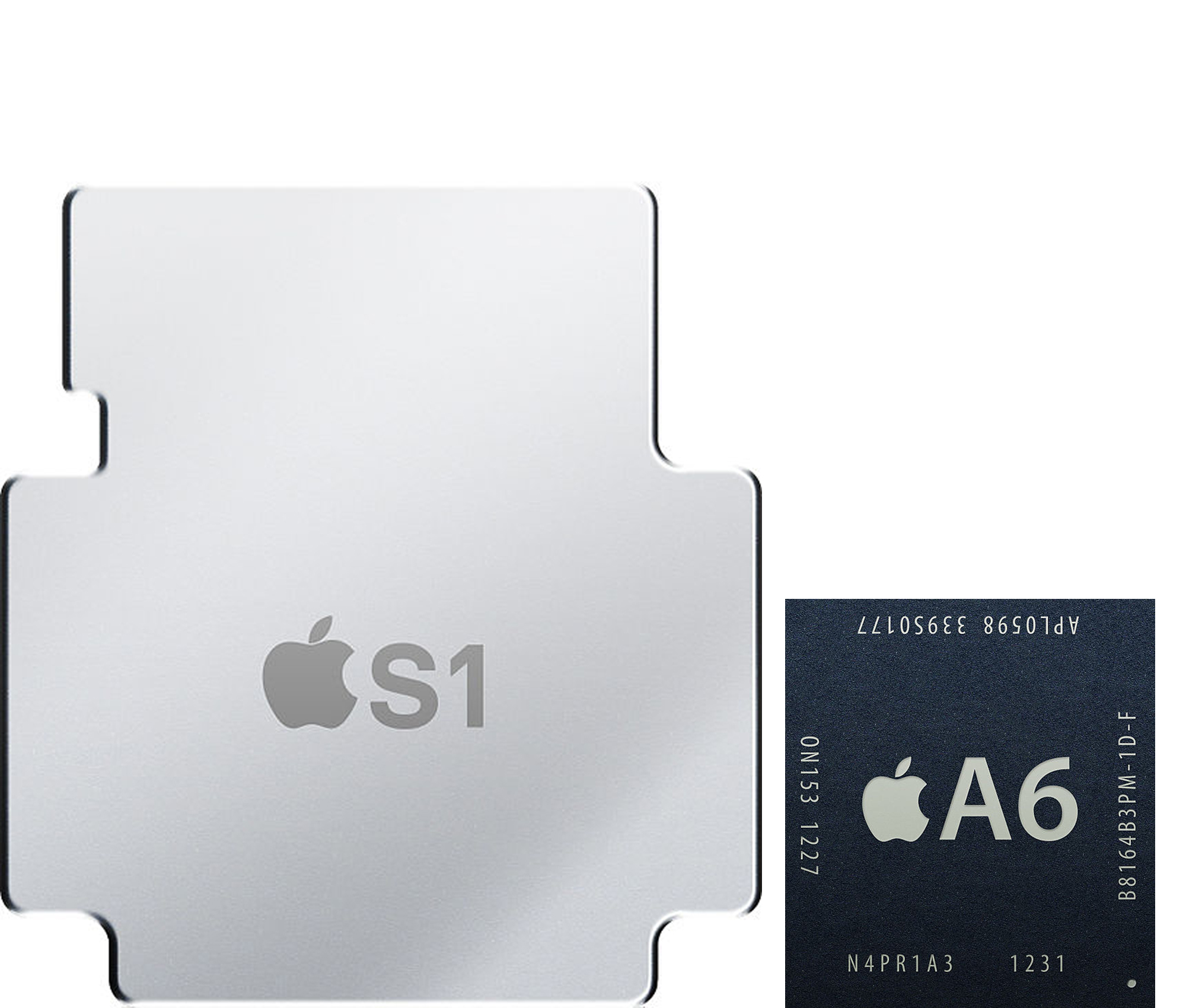
A size comparison of the S1 to the Apple A6 in the iPhone 5

== See also ==
- Apple silicon, the range of ARM-based processors designed by Apple.
- Apple Watch
- Apple S2
