= Apple S2 =

System-in-package in Apple Watch Series 2

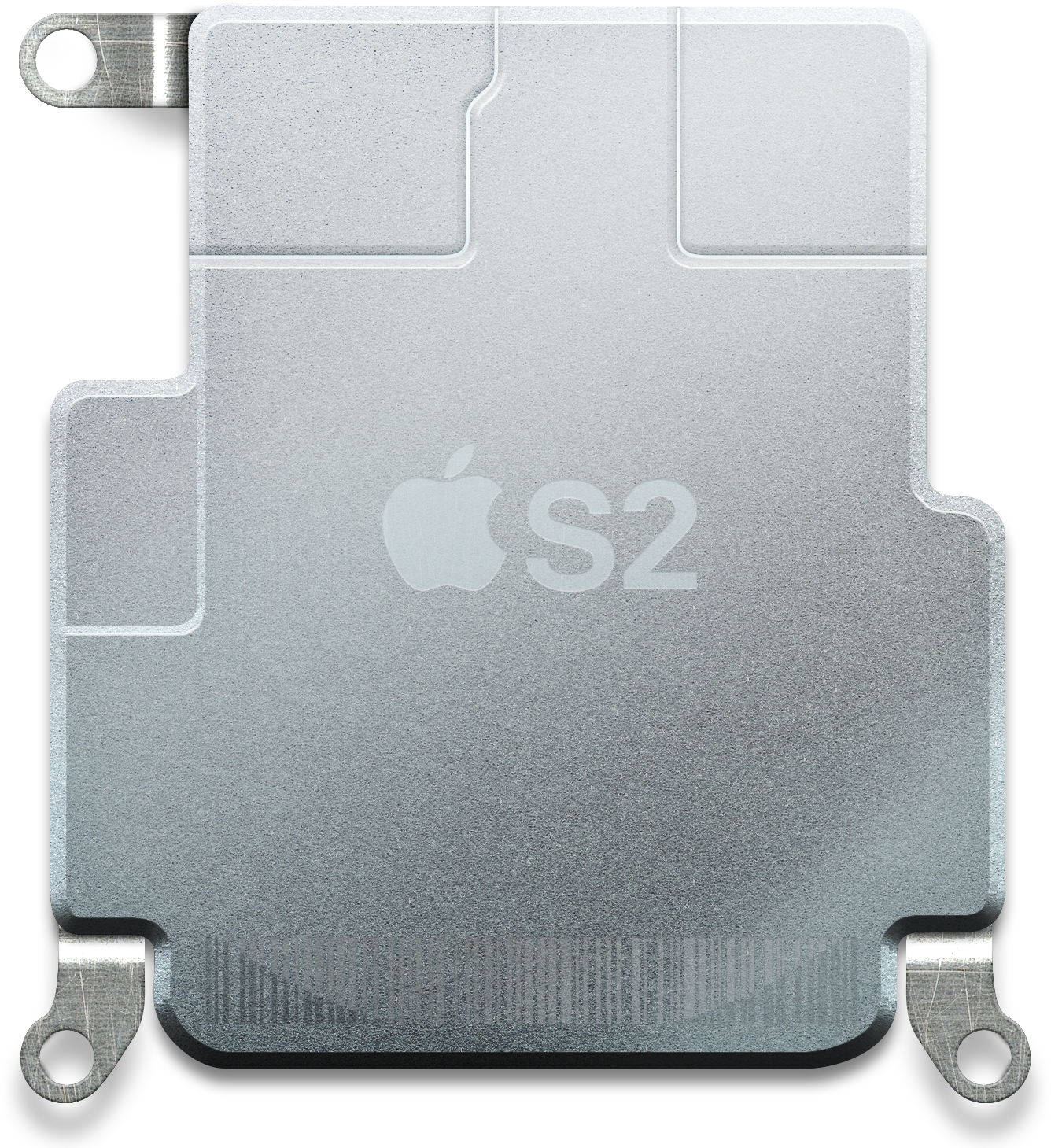

General information
- Launched: September, 2016
- Discontinued: September, 2017
- Designed by: Apple Inc.
- Common manufacturer: TSMC

Performance
- Max. CPU clock rate: 520 MHz

Physical specifications
- Cores: 2

Architecture and classification
- Application: Apple Watch Series 2
- Technology node: 16 nm
- Instruction set: ARM – ARMv7-A

Products, models, variants
- Variant: Apple S1P

History
- Predecessor: Apple S1
- Successor: Apple S3

The Apple S2 is a system in package (SiP) processor developed and marketed by Apple Inc., part of the Apple silicon series. It is the integrated computer in the Apple Watch Series 2, utilizing two cores. It was revealed on September 7, 2016, with very little info about specifications. Apple said the two cores inside the S2 delivered 50% higher performance and the GPU delivered twice as much as its predecessor, the Apple S1.

The S1P shipped in the Apple Watch Series 1 is a stripped down version of the S2 that lacks GPS functionality, but is otherwise identical.

== System-in-Package design ==
It uses a customized application processor that together with 512 MB memory, 8 GB storage and support processors for wireless connectivity, GPS, sensors and I/O constitute a complete computer in a single package. This package is filled with resin for durability.

=== Components ===
The device integrates discrete components like Wi-Fi, Bluetooth, GPS, NFC, touch controller, accelerometers, barometric sensor and RAM. In total, there are 42 individual silicon dies integrated into the single S2 component.

== Images ==
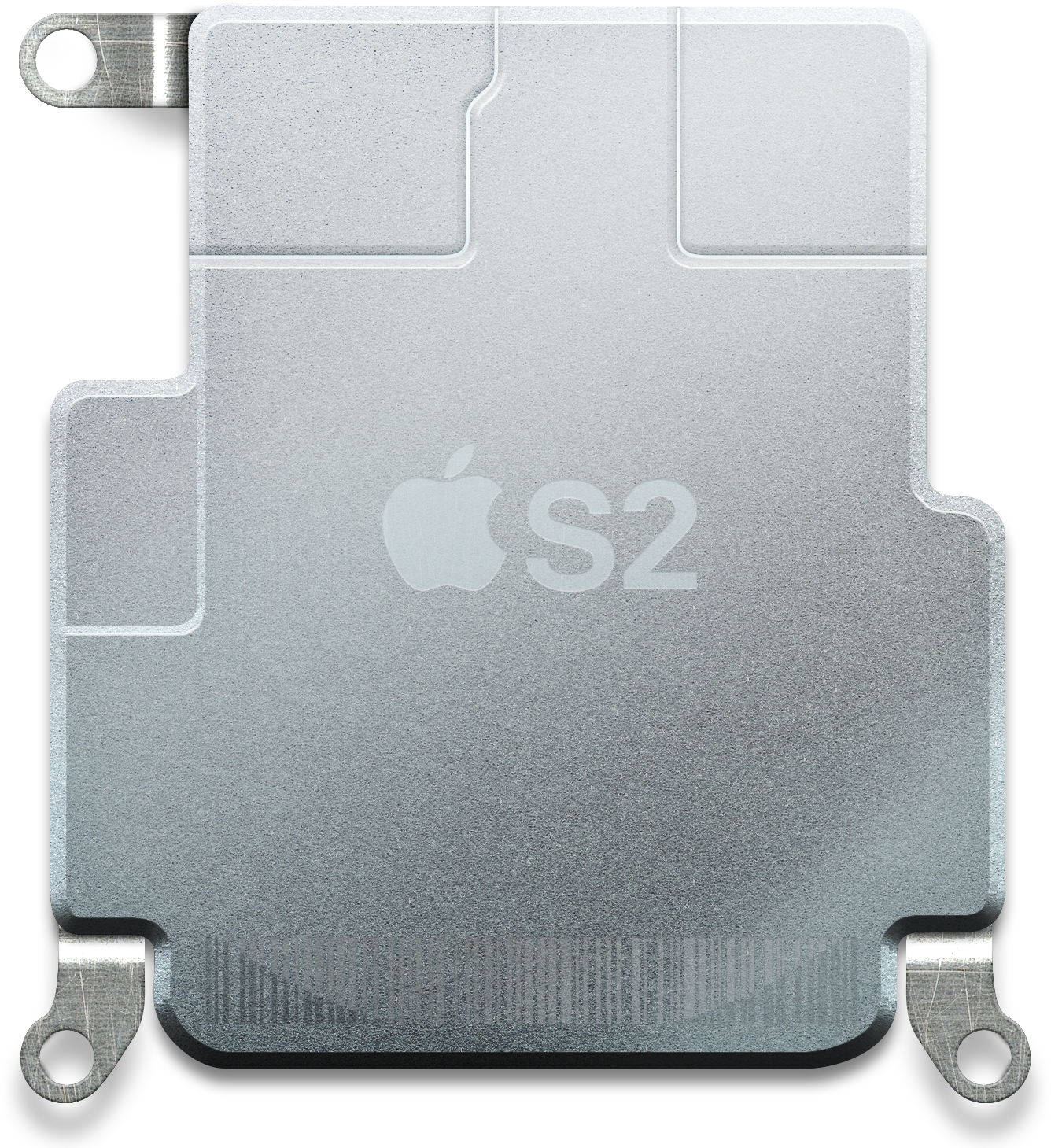
An illustration of the encapsulated S2 package

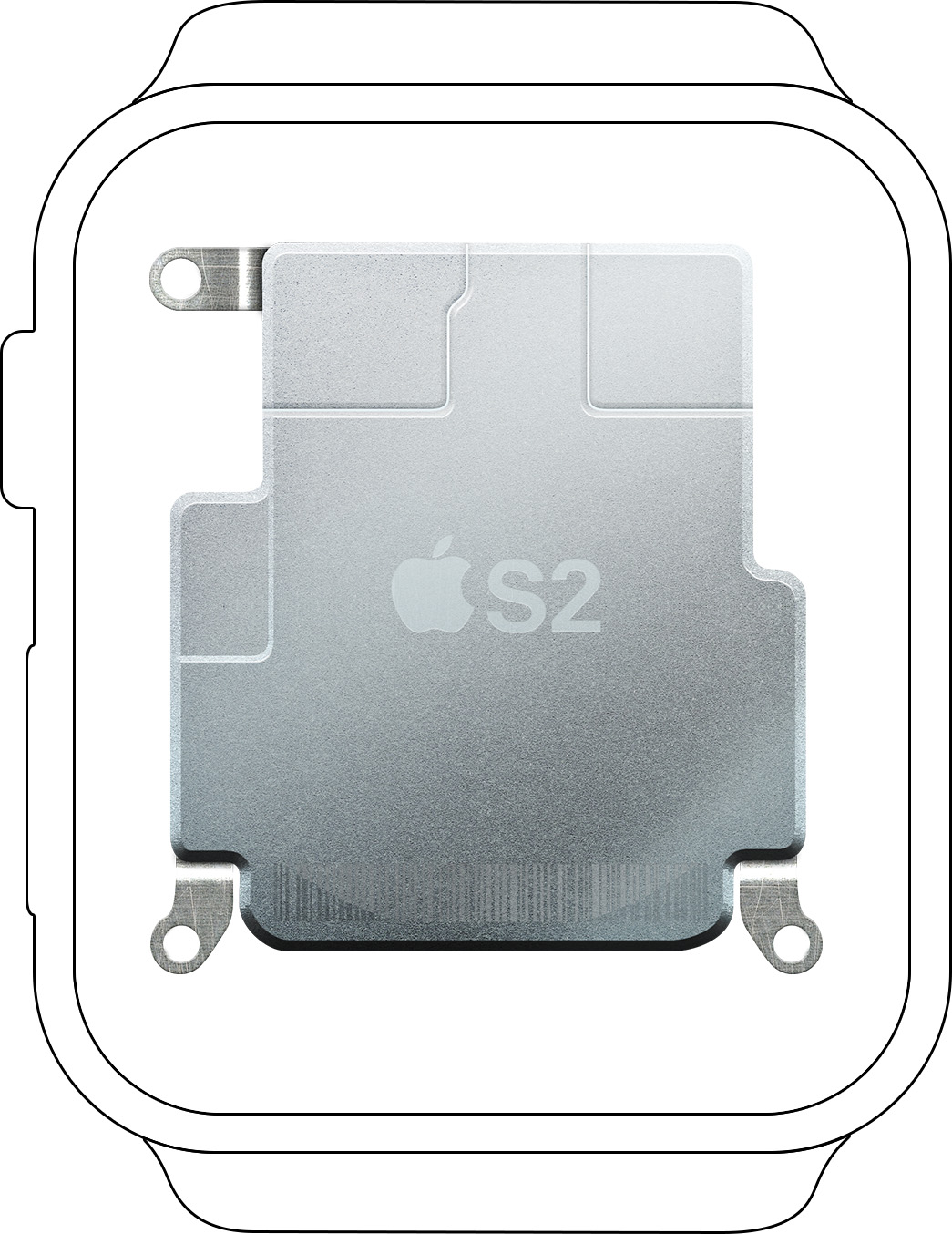
This is how large the S2 is compared to the Apple Watch Series 2 case.

== See also ==
- Apple silicon, the range of ARM-based processors designed by Apple
- Apple Watch
