= IOS 18 =

2024 mobile operating system

iOS 18
- Version of the iOS operating system

- iOS 18 home screen on an iPhone 16
- Developer: Apple
- Written in: C, C++, Objective-C, Swift, assembly language
- OS family: iOS
- Source model: Closed with open-source components
- General availability: September 16, 2024; 2 years ago
- Latest release: 18.7.12 (November 9, 2026; 1 day ago) [±]
- Available in: 42 languages
- List of languages English (Australia, UK, U.S.), Chinese (Simplified, Traditional, Traditional – Hong Kong), French (Canada, France), German, Italian, Japanese, Korean, Lithuanian, Spanish (Latin America, Spain), Arabic, Bangla, Bulgarian, Catalan, Croatian, Czech, Danish, Dutch, Finnish, Greek, Gujarati, Hebrew, Hindi, Hungarian, Indonesian, Kannada, Kazakh, Malay, Malayalam, Marathi, Norwegian, Odia, Polish, Portuguese (Brazil, Portugal), Punjabi, Romanian, Russian, Slovak, Slovenian, Swedish, Tamil, Telugu, Thai, Turkish, Ukrainian, Urdu, Vietnamese
- Update method: Software update
- Kernel type: Hybrid (XNU)
- License: Proprietary software with open-source components
- Preceded by: iOS 17
- Succeeded by: iOS 26
- Official website: iOS 18 at the Wayback Machine (archived September 5, 2025)
- Tagline: Yours. Truly.

Support status
- Obsolete, unsupported for newer iPhones. Receiving security updates for iPhones not supported by iOS 26 or later. Widespread third-party app support.

Articles in the series

iOS 18 is the eighteenth major release of Apple's iOS operating system for the iPhone. It was announced on June 10, 2024, at the 2024 Worldwide Developers Conference (WWDC), and made publicly available on September 16, 2024, as a free software update for supported iOS devices. It is the direct successor to iOS 17 and was announced alongside iPadOS 18, macOS Sequoia, watchOS 11, visionOS 2, and tvOS 18.

iOS 18 is the last version of iOS that features a flat design style, as that design style was replaced with Liquid Glass in its successor, iOS 26, which was released on September 15, 2025.

== Features ==
=== Apple Intelligence ===
The Apple Intelligence platform is available in iOS 18.1 and beyond, on the iPhone 15 Pro and iPhone 15 Pro Max models as well as the iPhone 16 and iPhone 16 Pro models. Apple Intelligence adds artificial intelligence (AI) capabilities and large language model integrations to Siri and other operating system functions, such as the Photos app and image creation tools.

Apple's Intelligence features are set to be introduced gradually across several forthcoming updates. These features were not included in the initial release of the iPhone 16 models.

=== Calculator ===
iOS 18's calculator introduces Math Notes, a new feature that allows users to perform and track calculations on separate sheets, solve mathematical equations, and plot functions on graphs. With integrated handwriting recognition, Math Notes automatically evaluates user input and displays the results in their own handwriting. The redesigned Calculator app, now shared between iOS and iPadOS, marks the first time an official calculator has been available for iPad.

=== Messages ===
iOS 18 supports Rich Communication Services (RCS) on supported conversations, including support for read receipts and higher-quality multimedia sharing across various platforms. As with SMS, it is designated with green message bubbles and buttons to distinguish it from blue iMessage conversations. Availability of RCS messaging varies by carrier availability and compatibility. Apple previously refused the adoption of RCS in iOS.

In 2022, after being questioned about RCS potentially coming to iPhone to increase compatibility with Android, Tim Cook said that iPhone users were not expressing interest in RCS and instead suggested that a solution would be to switch to an iPhone to use iMessage. The person who asked the question followed up, explaining that they use an iPhone while their mom uses an Android phone, to which Tim Cook jokingly replied "Buy your mom an iPhone" to large controversy. The quote was later cited in an anti-trust lawsuit against Apple Inc. filed by the United States Department of Justice.

iOS 18.4 added RCS support for more carriers.

In iMessage, animated effects can be applied to any letter, word, or phrase, and text formatting such as bold, italic, underline, and strikethrough can be applied to any part of the text as well. Both can be used simultaneously but cannot be used with the same selected text, however.

=== Photos ===
iOS 18 includes a significant redesign of the Photos app. Slideshows known as collections are now automatically generated and visible at the top of the screen. Support for encoding and decoding the ISO 21496-1 gain map standard for HDR images was added, which allows for cross-platform HDR compatibility while remaining backwards compatible with SDR displays. This redesign has led to backlash from many users who find it too confusing and is said to be the most controversial change in iOS 18.

=== Home screen ===
iOS 18 allows users to customize the icon color as well as the icon position and size on the home screen.

A toggle to activate dark mode icons for first-party apps and many third party ones was implemented.

Previous iOS versions arranged icons on a preset grid, but now users can place them anywhere.

In iOS 18, app widgets and some apps can now be enlarged or reduced as desired.

Many app icons were given gradients or had them removed.

In iOS 18, applications can now be locked or hidden. Locked apps require passcode or biometric authentication to run. Hidden apps are moved to a designated "Hidden" folder in the App Library; accessing that folder requires passcode or biometric authentication. Hidden apps do not show in other places on the phone such as Siri Suggestions and the Settings app.

In iOS 18.1, a new feature was introduced which enables users to edit the iPhone home screen through iPhone Mirroring.

=== Control Center ===
iOS 18 comes with a redesign to the Control Center, allowing for multiple pages of controls, resizable buttons, and third-party controls.

=== Passwords ===
Apple introduced the Passwords app, a password manager aimed at simplifying password management for websites, applications, Wi-Fi, and verification codes. This new app is heavily inspired by and replaces the Passwords section that was previously found in Settings, with the addition of Wi-Fi passwords. All existing passwords and codes in Settings are automatically moved to the Passwords app upon updating.

=== recoveryOS ===
iOS 18 includes recoveryOS for the iPhone 16 series that allows users to restore firmware wirelessly from another iPhone 16. While all iPhone devices running iOS 18 are able to recover and restore firmware for an iPhone 16 device, wireless firmware recovery can only work between iPhone 16 devices.

=== Others ===
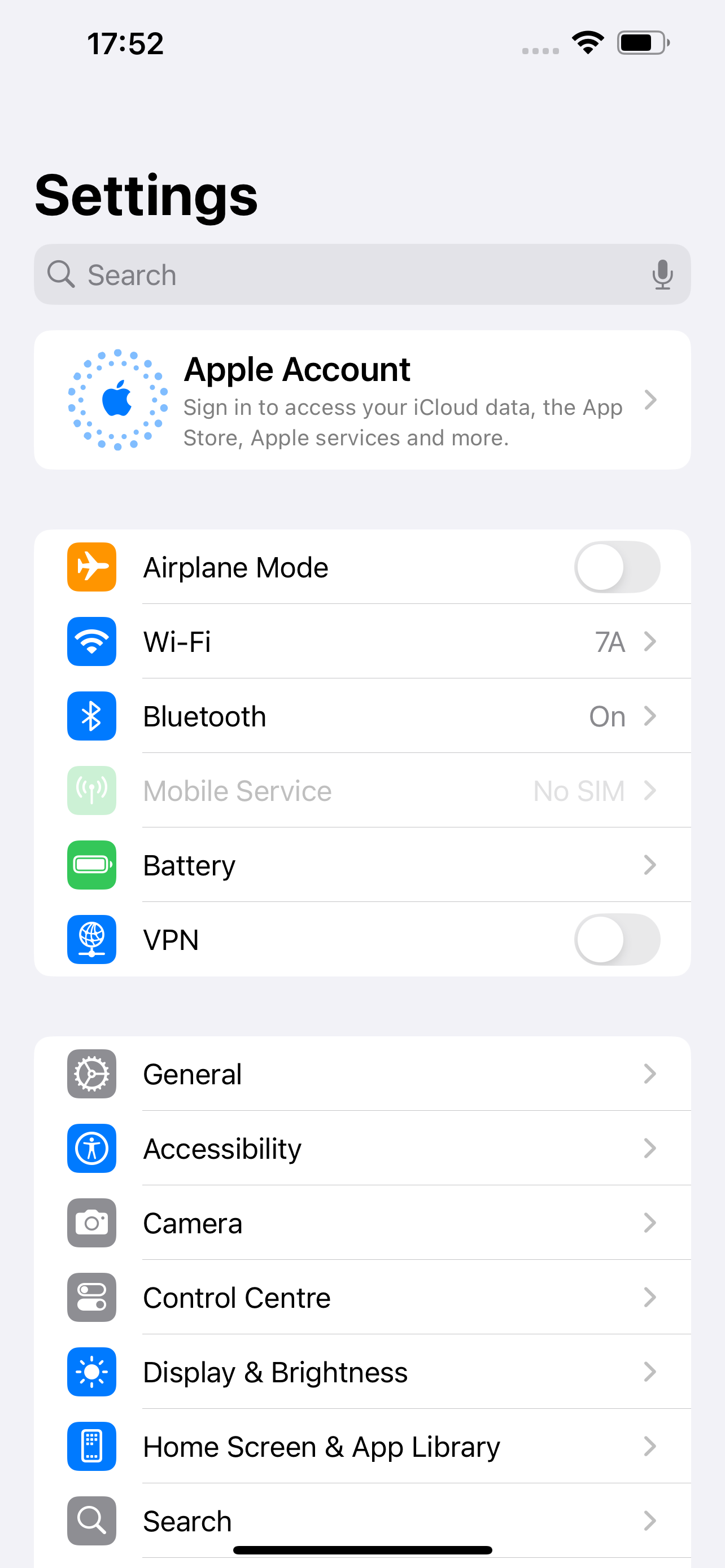
iOS 18 Settings on an iPhone 14 Plus

With iOS 18.1, iOS allows the detection and display of battery health information of a non-Apple battery.

On devices with an OLED display, there is a bulge animation when a hardware button is pressed.

With iOS 18.2, users are able to share a link with others or airlines to track the location of AirTags or other accessories in the Find My app.

Reports from law enforcement suggested that a new security feature was added that would reboot iPhones after 72 hours of inactivity to make it harder to break into, which researchers were able to confirm while looking at the code for iOS 18.1.

iOS 18.2 allowed app developers such as Truecaller to add real-time Caller ID and spam-blocking.

With iOS 18.5, Apple introduced the 2025 Pride wallpaper. This update also fixed several security vulnerabilities.

== Supported devices ==
iOS 18 requires a device with an Apple A12 Bionic processor or newer; all iPhones that support iOS 17 are also compatible with iOS 18. The Apple Intelligence feature requires an Apple A17 Pro processor or newer. However, iPhones with an A12 Bionic or A13 Bionic (Note: iPhone 11, 11 Pro, 11 Pro Max, and the second-generation SE) chip have limited support (Note: Messages via Satellite, and certain Live Audio Transcription enhancements are not available on iPhones older than the iPhone 12 series.) while iPhones with an A14 Bionic to A16 chip (Note: iPhone 12, 12 Mini, 12 Pro, and 12 Pro Max) are fully supported but lack Apple Intelligence.

iPhones that support iOS 18 are:

Supported Device	Chipset	Apple Intelligence support
iPhone XS & XS Max	A12	No
iPhone XR	A12	No
iPhone 11	A13	No
iPhone 11 Pro & 11 Pro Max	A13	No
iPhone SE (2nd generation)	A13	No
iPhone 12 & 12 Mini	A14	No
iPhone 12 Pro & 12 Pro Max	A14	No
iPhone 13 & 13 Mini	A15	No
iPhone 13 Pro & 13 Pro Max	A15	No
iPhone SE (3rd generation)	A15	No
iPhone 14 & 14 Plus	A15	No
iPhone 14 Pro & 14 Pro Max	A16	No
iPhone 15 & 15 Plus	A16	No
iPhone 15 Pro & Pro Max	A17 Pro	Yes
iPhone 16 & 16 Plus	A18	Yes
iPhone 16 Pro & 16 Pro Max	A18 Pro	Yes
iPhone 16e	A18	Yes

== Version history ==
Version	Build	Release date	Notes
18.0	22A3351	September 20, 2024	Initial release for iPhone 16 and iPhone 16 Pro lineup
18.0	22A3354	September 16, 2024	Developer release notes
18.0.1	22A3370	October 3, 2024	
18.1	22B83	October 28, 2024	Developer release notes
18.1.1	22B91	November 19, 2024	
18.2	22C152	December 11, 2024	Developer release notes
18.2.1	22C161	January 6, 2025	
18.3	22D63	January 27, 2025	Developer release notes
18.3	22D64	February 3, 2025	iPhone 11 and iPhone 11 Pro models only
18.3	22D8063	February 28, 2025	Initial release for the iPhone 16e
18.3.1	22D72	February 10, 2025	
18.3.1	22D8075	February 19, 2025	Day one update for iPhone 16e only
18.3.2	22D82	March 11, 2025	
18.3.2	22D8082	March 11, 2025	iPhone 16e only
18.4	22E240	March 31, 2025	Developer release notes
18.4.1	22E252	April 16, 2025	
18.5	22F76	May 12, 2025	Developer release notes
18.6	22G86	July 29, 2025	Developer release notes
18.6.1	22G90	August 14, 2025	Re-enabled Blood Oxygen feature on Apple Watch
18.6.2	22G100	August 20, 2025	Security content
18.7	22H20	September 15, 2025	Over-the-air updates (OTA) for all iPhones, IPSW files released for iPhone XR and XS models only
18.7.1	22H31	September 29, 2025	Over-the-air updates (OTA) for all iPhones, IPSW files released for iPhone XR and XS models only
18.7.2	22H124	November 5, 2025	Over-the-air updates (OTA) for all iPhones, IPSW files released for iPhone XR and XS models only
18.7.3	22H217	December 12, 2025	Released for all iPhones as RC on beta channels and removed from beta channels shortly after, officially released for iPhone XR and XS models only
18.7.4	22H218	January 26, 2026	This update extends the certificate required by features such as iMessage, FaceTime, and device activation to continue working after January 2027. iPhone XR and XS models only
18.7.5	22H311	February 11, 2026	iPhone XR and XS models only
18.7.6	22H320	March 4, 2026	iPhone XR and XS models only
18.7.7	22H333	March 24, 2026	iPhone XR and XS models only
18.7.7	22H340	April 1, 2026	Over-the-air updates (OTA) for all iPhones to backport security fixes for DarkSword, IPSW for iPhone XR and XS models only
18.7.8	22H352	April 22, 2026	Over-the-air updates (OTA) for all iPhones to backport security fixes for DarkSword, IPSW for iPhone XR and XS models only
18.7.9	22H355	May 11, 2026	Security content. All future updates for iPhone XR and XS models only
18.7.10	22H374	August 17, 2026	Security content
18.7.11	22H384	October 26, 2026	Security content
18.7.12	22H390	November 9, 2026	Security content
Legend: Unsupported Latest version Preview version

Apple initially limited updates for devices eligible for iOS 26 to version 18.7.2. However, following the slow adoption of iOS 26 (largely driven by the controversial Liquid Glass interface) and the emergence of the DarkSword exploit, the company reversed course and took the unusual step of expanding iOS 18.7.7 (originally released only for the iPhone XS and XR) to all newer iPhone models to address the security threat. Apple later did the same for iOS 18.7.8.

See Apple's official release notes and official security update contents.

== Reception ==
Reception of iOS 18 was mixed to positive from critics and users; it was praised for its deep personalization and new satellite features but criticized for its numerous bugs from the initial versions and the gradual rollout of AI features.

== See also ==
- Apple Intelligence
- Artificial intelligence
- iPadOS 18
- macOS Sequoia
- tvOS 18
- visionOS 2
- watchOS 11

== Notes ==
Preceded by iOS 17	iOS 18; 2024	Succeeded by iOS 26
