= IPad (10th generation) =

Tablet computer developed by Apple (2022–2025)

iPad (10th generation)

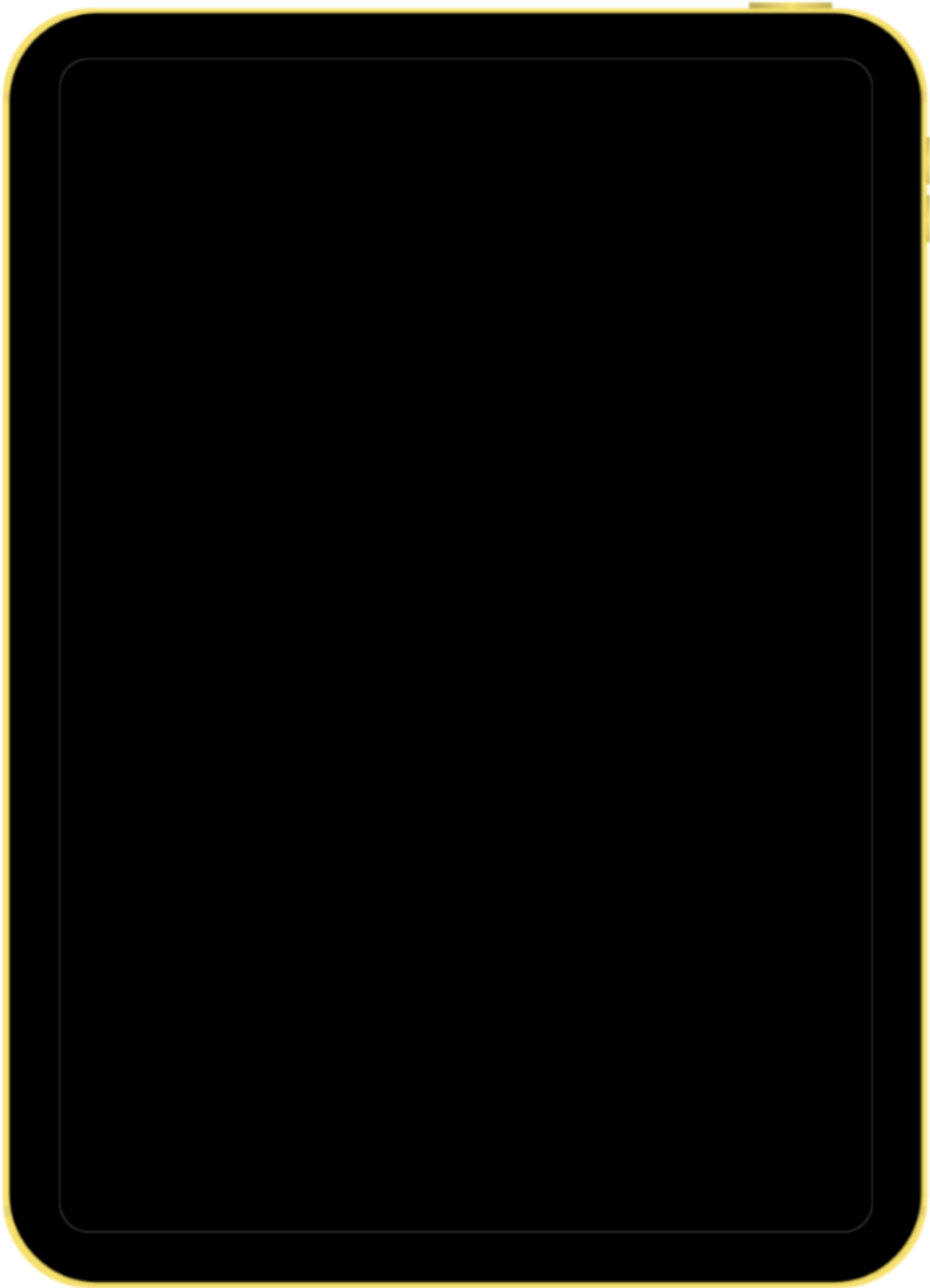
- iPad (10th generation) in Yellow
- Also known as: iPad (10th generation), iPad 10.9-inch, iPad 10
- Developer: Apple
- Manufacturer: Foxconn (on contract)
- Product family: iPad
- Type: Tablet computer
- Generation: 10th
- Released: October 26, 2022; 4 years ago
- Introductory price: Wi-Fi: US$449; Wi-Fi + Cellular: US$599
- Discontinued: March 4, 2025; 19 months ago
- Operating system: Original: iPadOS 16.1; Current: iPadOS 27.2, released October 26, 2026
- System on a chip: Apple A14 Bionic with 64-bit architecture and embedded motion co-processor
- CPU: Hexa-core (2× 3.1 GHz Firestorm and 4× 1.82 GHz Icestorm)
- Memory: 4 GB LPDDR4X SDRAM
- Storage: 64 or 256 GB (Note: 1 GB = 1 billion bytes)
- Display: 11 inches (280 mm) 2360 × 1640 px (264 ppi), 500 nits max brightness (typical), 60 Hz refresh rate
- Graphics: Apple-designed quad core
- Sound: Stereo
- Input: Multi-touch screen, headset controls, proximity and ambient light sensors, 3-axis accelerometer, 3-axis gyroscope, digital compass, dual microphone, Touch ID fingerprint reader, barometer
- Camera: Front: 12 MP, 1080p HD, ƒ/2.4 aperture Rear: 12.0 MP AF, with Five Element Lens, Hybrid IR filter, video stabilization, face detection, Smart HDR 3, ƒ/1.8 aperture
- Connectivity: Both models: Wi-Fi 6 (802.11ax) with 2x2 MIMO, simultaneous dual band Bluetooth 5.2 Wi-Fi + Cellular: 5G NR (Bands n1, n2, n3, n5, n7, n8, n12, n20, n25, n28, n29, n30, n38, n40, n41, n48, n66, n71, n77, n78, n79); FDD-LTE (Bands 1, 2, 3, 4, 5, 7, 8, 11, 12, 13, 14, 17, 18, 19, 20, 21, 25, 26, 28, 29, 30, 32, 66, 71); TD-LTE (Bands 34, 38, 39, 40, 41, 42, 46, 48); UMTS/HSPA/HSPA+/DC‑HSDPA (850, 900, 1700/2100, 1900, 2100 MHz); Data only; Wi-Fi calling; eSIM
- Power: 28.6 W·h, up to 10 hours of battery life
- Online services: App Store, iTunes Store, iBookstore, iCloud, Game Center
- Dimensions: 248.6 mm (9.79 in) H 179.5 mm (7.07 in) W 7 mm (0.28 in) D
- Weight: Wi-Fi: 477 g (1.052 lb); Wi-Fi + Cellular: 481 g (1.060 lb)
- Predecessor: iPad (9th generation)
- Successor: iPad (11th generation)
- Website: iPad 10.9-inch (10th generation) - Apple at the Wayback Machine (archived November 14, 2024)

The tenth-generation iPad (also referred to as the iPad 10.9-inch) is a tablet computer developed and marketed by Apple as the successor to the ninth-generation iPad. It was announced on October 18, 2022, and was released on October 26, 2022.

== Specifications ==
The design of the tenth-generation iPad more closely resembles the higher-end iPad Air and Pro models, with flatter sides and no home button. As with the iPad Air and Mini, the Touch ID sensor is located in the power button. It is available in silver, blue, pink, and yellow color finishes.

Like the iPad Air, it has a 10.9 in (280 mm) 2360x1640 Liquid Retina display; an increase from the previous 10.2 in (260 mm) model, but it is not laminated. The tenth-generation iPad uses an A14 Bionic processor, previously seen in the fourth-generation iPad Air and the iPhone 12 in 2020. The chip has a 6-core CPU, a 4-core GPU, and a 16-core Neural Engine.

The tenth-generation iPad has Bluetooth 5.2 and Wi-Fi 6 (802.11ax) wireless capabilities, as well as sub-6 GHz 5G on cellular models. It is the first base model iPad to use USB-C instead of the Lightning connector; connectivity is limited to USB 2.0 transfer speeds, with support for external displays at 1080p resolution at a refresh rate of 60 Hz, or 2160p at 30 Hz. The tenth-generation iPad does not include a headphone connector, requiring wireless headphones or a USB-C adapter sold separately.

The tenth-generation iPad features a 12-megapixel rear-facing wide-angle camera with an ƒ/1.8 aperture and 4K video recording support. In a first for any iPad, the front-facing camera is now located on the long edge of the display, so that it is horizontally centered when the tablet is in a landscape orientation.

Unlike the iPad (11th generation), the iPad (10th generation) does not feature the Battery Health section in Settings.

== Accessories ==
The tenth-generation iPad supports the first-generation Apple Pencil; a USB-C to Lightning cable adapter must be used to pair and charge it. This adapter has been included with newer production runs of the first-generation Pencil since October 2022, and is sold separately for existing owners. It also supports the lower-cost Apple Pencil (USB-C), which charges via a built-in USB-C port. Unlike other iPad models with USB-C, it does not support the second-generation Apple Pencil.

Apple unveiled a new keyboard cover accessory for the tenth-generation iPad known as the Magic Keyboard Folio, it is incompatible with the Magic Keyboard and Smart Keyboard Folio. Unlike the Magic Keyboard designed for the iPad Air and iPad Pro, the Magic Keyboard Folio detaches from the back cover and can be used as an adjustable stand, and includes a 14-key function row with a lock button.

== Reception ==
The tenth-generation iPad received mixed reviews from critics, with praise for its new design, battery life, and performance, but criticism for removing the headphone jack, the lack of support for the second-generation Apple Pencil, and a higher price point than its predecessor.

CNN writer Mike Andronico felt that the A14 processor had "the best [performance] we've seen on a tablet at this price" and made the device "more future-proof", while the Magic Keyboard Folio accessory was considered to potentially be Apple's "best keyboard cover yet". However, it was noted that its display was "starting to show its age" in comparison to the iPad Pro and the iPhone 14 Pro due to its lower resolution and refresh rate, and that "for the vast majority of people who just want a great tablet for streaming, sketching, gaming and some light productivity, the ninth-gen iPad is still the better value".

The Verge similarly questioned the model's positioning as being "stuck in the middle" between the cheaper ninth-generation iPad and the higher-end Air and Pro, noting that "in a vacuum, there's very little to complain about with the 10th-gen iPad. It's an excellent tablet that does all of the things you expect from a tablet very well", but that "it costs considerably more [than the ninth-generation model] and is not as good as an iPad Air. And since you can find a current iPad Air on sale fairly easily at this point, this new iPad is not the iPad to buy right now despite the fact that it has a lot going for it."

== Timeline ==
Timeline of iPad models
See also: List of Apple products

Source: Apple Newsroom Archive.
