= B86 =

B86 may refer to:

- Sicilian Defence, Scheveningen Variation, according to the list of chess openings
- Bundesstraße 86, a German road
- Villacher Straße, an Austrian road
- B-86 (Michigan county highway)
- Bphone B86, a smartphone made by Bkav in Vietnam
