= IPad (11th generation) =

Tablet computer developed by Apple released in 2025

iPad (A16)

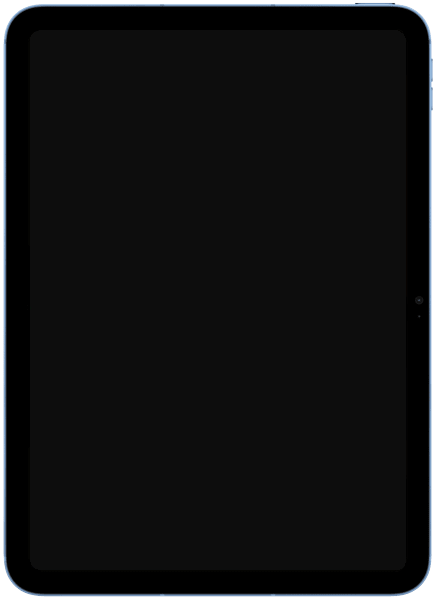
- 11th-generation iPad in Blue
- Also known as: iPad (11th generation) iPad 11-inch iPad 11
- Developer: Apple
- Product family: iPad
- Type: Tablet computer
- Generation: 11th
- Released: March 12, 2025; 19 months ago
- Availability: March 12, 2025 – present
- Introductory price: Wi-Fi: US$449; Wi-Fi + Cellular: US$499 (Note: Prices for the Wi-Fi and Wi-Fi + Cellular models were raised to $449 and $599 respectively on June 25, 2026, when the prices of various Apple products were increased by 20–30%.)
- Operating system: Original: iPadOS 18.3.2; Current: iPadOS 27.0.1, released September 28, 2026
- System on a chip: Apple A16 with 64-bit architecture and embedded motion co-processor
- CPU: 5-core CPU
- Memory: 6 GB (LPDDR5)
- Storage: 128, 256 or 512 GB (Note: 1 GB = 1 billion bytes)
- Display: 11 inches (280 mm); 2360 × 1640 px (264 ppi), 500 nits max brightness (typical), 60 Hz refresh rate
- Graphics: Apple-designed quad core
- Sound: Stereo
- Camera: Front: 12 MP, 1080p HD, ƒ/2.4 aperture Rear: 12.0 MP AF, with five element lens, hybrid IR filter, video stabilization, face detection, Smart HDR 4, ƒ/1.8 aperture
- Power: 28.93 Wh, up to 10 hours of surfing the web on Wi-Fi or watching video, up to 9 hours of surfing the web using cellular data network
- Online services: App Store, iTunes Store, iBookstore, iCloud, Game Center
- Dimensions: 248.6 mm (9.79 in) H 179.5 mm (7.07 in) W 7 mm (0.28 in) D
- Predecessor: iPad (10th generation)
- Related: iPad Air (M3)
- Website: www.apple.com/ipad-11/

The eleventh-generation iPad, marketed as the iPad (A16), is a tablet computer developed and marketed by Apple as the successor of the tenth-generation iPad. It was announced on March 4, 2025, and was released on March 12, 2025.

Similar to its predecessor, the eleventh-generation iPad retains the same dimensions, Touch ID sensor and design. Improvements include the faster A16 chip, a slight improvement to the camera and Bluetooth 5.3. Like the tenth-generation iPad, this iPad supports the Apple Pencil (USB-C) and Apple Pencil (1st generation), as well as supporting Apple's Magic Keyboard Folio keyboard cover accessory.

== Specifications ==
Like its predecessor, the Touch ID sensor is located in the power button and shares the same colors of silver, blue, pink, and yellow, except for the removal of the iPad branding in the lower midsection.

Like the tenth-generation iPad, it has an 11-inch (280 mm) 2360×1640 unlaminated Liquid Retina display. The 11th-generation iPad uses the A16 SoC, which is also used in the iPhone 14 Pro and iPhone 15.

The chip has a five-core CPU, a four-core GPU, and a 16-core Neural Engine. Because of the chip and RAM limitations, the iPad does not support Apple Intelligence. Unlike the tenth-generation iPad, this iPad has 6 GB of RAM, the same as the iPhone 14 Pro and iPhone 15 series.

The eleventh-generation iPad has Bluetooth 5.3 and Wi-Fi 6 (802.11ax) wireless capabilities, as well as sub-6 GHz 5G on cellular models. Connectivity is limited to USB 2.0 transfer speeds. Like its predecessor, it does not include a 3.5 mm headphone jack, requiring wireless headphones or a USB-C adapter, both sold separately.

The cellular version does not have a physical SIM-card slot and only supports eSIM, whereas the tenth-generation iPad also has a nano-SIM slot alongside eSIM support.

== Accessories ==
The eleventh-generation iPad supports Apple Pencil (USB-C) and the first-generation Apple Pencil. Additionally, the eleventh-generation iPad supports the same keyboard accessory, Magic Keyboard Folio, like its predecessor.

== Timeline ==
Timeline of iPad models
See also: List of Apple products

Source: Apple Newsroom Archive.
