= IPad Air (4th generation) =

2020 tablet computer by Apple

iPad Air (4th generation)

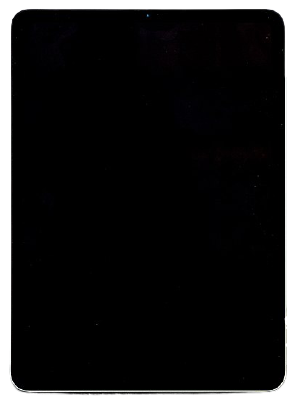
- iPad Air (4th generation)
- Also known as: iPad Air 4, iPad Air (10.9-inch)
- Developer: Apple Inc.
- Manufacturer: Foxconn
- Product family: iPad Air
- Type: Tablet computer
- Generation: 4th
- Released: October 23, 2020; 6 years ago
- Introductory price: $599 USD £579 GBP €649 EUR $779 CAD $879 SGD $899 AUD; R11 500 ZAR ₹54 900 INR
- Discontinued: March 8, 2022; 4 years ago
- Operating system: Original: iPadOS 14; Current: iPadOS 27.2, released October 26, 2026
- System on a chip: Apple A14 Bionic with 64-bit architecture and embedded motion co-processor
- CPU: Hexa-core (2× 3.1 GHz Firestorm and 4× 1.82 GHz Icestorm)
- Memory: 4 GB
- Storage: 64 or 256 GB flash memory
- Display: 10.9 inches (280 mm) (2,360 x 1,640) px (264 ppi), 500-nits Max Brightness, Wide-Color Display (P3), True Tone Display, Fully Laminated Display, 1.8% Reflectivity and Apple Pencil (2nd generation) support
- Graphics: Apple-designed 4-core
- Sound: Stereo speakers
- Input: Multi-touch screen, headset controls, proximity and ambient light sensors, 3-axis accelerometer, 3-axis gyroscope, digital compass, dual microphone, Touch ID fingerprint reader, barometer
- Camera: Front: 7 MP, ƒ/2.2 aperture, burst mode, timer mode, exposure control, face detection, Smart HDR, wide-color capture, auto image stabilization, Retina flash, 1080p HD video recording Rear: 12 MP, ƒ/1.8 aperture, five-element lens, burst mode, timer mode, exposure control, noise reduction, face detection, Hybrid IR filter, Live Photos with stabilization, Autofocus with Focus Pixels, face detection, Smart HDR, panorama, wide-color capture, auto image stabilization, 2160p 4K 60fps video recording, video stabilization, slo-mo, time-lapse
- Connectivity: Wi-Fi and Wi-Fi + Cellular: 802.11 Wi-Fi 6 dual-band (2.4 GHz & 5 GHz) and MIMO Bluetooth 5.0 Wi-Fi + Cellular: GPS & GLONASS GSM UMTS / HSDPA 850, 1700, 1800, 1900 MHz LTE Multiple bands 1, 2, 3, 4, 5, 7, 8, 11, 12, 13, 14, 17, 18, 19, 20, 21, 25, 26, 29, 30, 34, 38, 39, 40, 41, 46, 48, 66, 71
- Power: 28.6 W·h lithium-polymer battery
- Online services: App Store, iTunes Store, iBookstore, iCloud, Game Center
- Dimensions: 9.74 inches (247.6 mm);(h) 7 inches (178.5 mm);(w) 0.24 inch (6.1 mm);(d)
- Weight: Wi-Fi: 1.0 pound (458 grams); Wi-Fi + Cellular: 1.01 pounds (460 grams)
- Predecessor: iPad Air (3rd generation)
- Successor: iPad Air (5th generation)
- Website: iPad Air - Apple at the Wayback Machine (archived February 21, 2022)

The iPad Air (4th generation), informally referred to as iPad Air 4, is a tablet computer developed and marketed by Apple Inc. It was announced by Apple on September 15, 2020. Pre-orders began on October 16, 2020, and shipping began a week later on October 23, 2020, alongside the iPhone 12 and iPhone 12 Pro. The device closely resembles the design of the 11-inch iPad Pro (3rd generation) and has several features that were previously exclusive to the iPad Pro line, such as support for the iPad Magic Keyboard and the second-generation Apple Pencil. It is available in five colors: Space Gray, Silver, Rose Gold, Green, and Sky Blue.

The 4th generation iPad Air was discontinued on March 8, 2022, following the announcement of its successor, the iPad Air (5th generation).

== Features ==
=== Hardware ===
The Apple A14 Bionic SoC has 11.9 billion transistors inside, allowing for higher efficiency in terms of both power and performance. The chip has a 6-core CPU that is 40 percent faster than the A12, a 4-core GPU that is 30 percent faster, and Apple's 16-core Neural Engine, which is twice as fast and features improved machine learning. The Neural Engine can process more than 11 trillion operations per second.

It has a wider 60 Hz 10.9-inch 2360 by 1640 Liquid Retina Display display with 3.8 million pixels. The display is laminated and has an anti-reflective coating, as well as featuring wide color and True Tone.

The Home Button in the previous generation has been removed, as has the headphone jack; the Touch ID sensor has been relocated to the Sleep/Wake button attached on the top right edge of the device. Landscape stereo audio effect is also added to the system's audio recording system.

It features a rear 12MP camera capable of 4K video recording at up to 60fps as well as a 7MP FaceTime camera capable of 1080p 60fps video.

The hardware specifications of the iPad Air (4th generation) are comparable to those of the iPad (10th generation). However, the iPad Air lacks 5G cellular data and Center Stage front camera support, whereas the iPad (10th generation) lacks a P3 Wide Color display, Apple Pencil (2nd generation) support, and Smart Keyboard Folio support.

=== Connectivity ===
With the release of its fourth-generation iPad Air, Apple continued the use of the USB-C port, as was seen in the third-generation iPad Pro. The port is used for charging as well as connecting external devices and accessories. It is capable of transferring up to 5 Gbit/s (625 MB/s), allowing for fast connections to cameras and external storage, as well as support for monitors with up to 4K resolution. For wireless connection, the device comes with Bluetooth 5.0 and WiFi 6 (802.11ax).

It is compatible with the second-generation Apple Pencil, Magic Keyboard for iPad, and Smart Keyboard Folio.

== Reception ==
The fourth-generation iPad Air received generally positive reviews for its performance and design, though many criticized it for being more expensive than its predecessor.

Henry T. Casey of Tom's Guide lauded the iPad Air 4, calling it "the best tablet for most people" and "one of the best iPads ever." Similarly, James Peckham from TechRadar hailed the tablet as a "phenomenally well-made" device.

As the device was released during the COVID-19 pandemic, Some praised Apple's decision to integrate Touch ID into the power button instead of using Face ID, which could struggle to correctly identify users wearing a face mask.

== Timeline ==
Timeline of iPad models
See also: List of Apple products

Source: Apple Newsroom Archive.

Preceded by iPad Air (3rd generation)	iPad Air (4th generation); 2020	Succeeded by iPad Air (5th generation)
