= IPhone 12 Pro =

2020 smartphone by Apple

iPhone 12 Pro iPhone 12 Pro Max

- iPhone 12 Pro in Gold
- Brand: Apple
- Type: Smartphone
- Generation: 14th
- First released: Pro: October 23, 2020; 6 years ago Pro Max: November 13, 2020; 6 years ago
- Availability by region: Pro: October 23, 2020: Australia; Austria; Belgium; Canada; Czech Republic; China; Denmark; Finland; France; Germany; Hong Kong; Ireland; Italy; Japan; Luxembourg; Mexico; New Zealand; The Netherlands; Norway; Poland; Portugal; Romania; Russia; Saudi Arabia; Somalia; Singapore; Slovenia; Spain; Sweden; Switzerland; Taiwan; United Arab Emirates; United Kingdom; United States; October 30, 2020: Armenia; Iceland; India; South Korea; November 6, 2020: Belarus; Serbia; November 13, 2020: Malaysia; November 27, 2020: Thailand; Vietnam; December 4, 2020: Chile; Sri Lanka; Turkey; December 14, 2020: Bangladesh; December 17, 2020: Israel; December 18, 2020: Indonesia; Philippines; South Africa; Pro Max: November 13, 2020: Australia; Austria; Belgium; Canada; Colombia; Czech Republic; China; Denmark; Finland; France; Germany; Hong Kong; India; Ireland; Italy; Japan; Luxembourg; Malaysia; Mexico; The Netherlands; Norway; New Zealand; Poland; Portugal; Romania; Russia; Saudi Arabia; Singapore; Slovenia; Spain; Sweden; Switzerland; Taiwan; United Arab Emirates; United Kingdom; United States; November 20, 2020: Armenia; Brazil; Macau; South Korea; November 27, 2020: Thailand; Vietnam; December 4, 2020: Sri Lanka; December 17, 2020: Israel; December 18, 2020: Indonesia; Philippines; South Africa; December 23, 2020: Turkey; January 5, 2021: Bangladesh
- Discontinued: September 14, 2021; 5 years ago
- Predecessor: iPhone 11 Pro and Pro Max
- Successor: iPhone 13 Pro and Pro Max
- Related: iPhone 12 and 12 Mini
- Compatible networks: GSM, CDMA, 3G, EVDO, HSPA+, 4G LTE, 5G
- Form factor: Slate
- Dimensions: Pro: H: 146.7 mm (5.78 in); W: 71.5 mm (2.81 in); D: 7.4 mm (0.29 in); Pro Max: H: 160.8 mm (6.33 in); W: 78.1 mm (3.07 in); D: 7.4 mm (0.29 in)
- Weight: Pro: 189 g (6.7 oz); Pro Max: 228 g (8.0 oz)
- Operating system: Original: iOS 14; Current: iOS 27.2.1, released November 9, 2026
- System-on-chip: A14 Bionic
- CPU: Hexa-core (2x high-power Firestorm cores @3.1 GHz + 4x low-power Icestorm cores @1.8 GHz)
- GPU: Quad-core Apple-designed GPU, up to 750 GFLOPS
- Modem: Qualcomm Snapdragon X55 5G
- Memory: 6 GB LPDDR4X
- Storage: 128, 256 or 512 GB (Note: 1 GB = 1 billion bytes) NVMe
- SIM: nanoSIM and eSIM (eSIM not available on Mainland China models, Hong Kong, Macao and Singapore models, as they have 2 physical SIMs)
- Battery: Pro: 10.78 Wh (2,815 mAh) Lithium-ion battery @ 3.83 V; Pro Max: 14.13 Wh (3,687 mAh) Lithium-ion battery @ 3.83 V
- Charging: Lightning charging (12 W); USB PD via Lightning fast charging (20 W); MagSafe wireless charging (15 W)
- Rear camera: 12 MP (4032 x 3024 px); Dolby Vision; Night Mode; 4K @ 24, 30, 60; 1080p@30, 60, 120; 720p@240; 26 mm; 12 MP telephoto (52 mm, 2x) and ultra-wide (13 mm, 0.5x)
- Front camera: 12 MP (4000 x 3000 px); Dolby Vision; 4K @ 24, 30, 60; 1080p@30, 60, 120; 720p@240; 26 mm
- Display: 12 Pro: 6.1 in (155 mm) diagonal, 2532×1170px at 460.3 ppi, supplied by Samsung Display; 12 Pro Max: 6.7 in (170 mm), 2778×1284px at 457.3 ppi, supplied by Samsung Display; Display features: Super Retina XDR; P3 wide color gamut; 800 cd/m^{2} max. brightness (typical), 1200 cd/m^{2} max. brightness (HDR); Haptic Touch; True Tone; Fingerprint-resistant oleophobic coating
- Sound: Sound features: Stereo speakers; Spatial audio support; Audio over Lightning; Taptic Engine vibration motor; Supported formats: AAC‑LC; HE‑AAC / HE‑AAC v2; Protected AAC; MP3; Linear PCM; Apple Lossless; FLAC; Dolby Digital (AC‑3); Dolby Digital Plus (E‑AC‑3); Dolby Atmos; Audible (formats 2, 3, 4, Audible Enhanced Audio, AAX and AAX+)
- Connectivity: All models: TD-LTE (bands 34, 38, 39, 40, 41, 42, 46, 48); GSM/EDGE (850, 900, 1800, 1900 MHz); Wi-Fi 6 (802.11ax), 2x2 MIMO; Bluetooth 5.0; Ultra-wideband (UWB); NFC; GPS, GLONASS, Galileo, QZSS, BeiDou; A2341 / A2342: 5G NR (bands n1, n2, n3, n5, n7, n8, n12, n20, n25, n28, n38, n40, n41, n66, n71, n77, n78, n79); 5G NR mmWave (bands n260, n261); FDD-LTE (bands 1, 2, 3, 4, 5, 7, 8, 12, 13, 14, 17, 18, 19, 20, 25, 26, 28, 29, 30, 32, 66, 71); CDMA EV-DO Rev. A (800, 1900 MHz); UMTS/HSPA+/DC-HSDPA (850, 900, 1700/2100, 1900, 2100 MHz); A2406 / A2410: 5G NR (bands n1, n2, n3, n5, n7, n8, n12, n20, n25, n28, n38, n40, n41, n66, n71, n77, n78, n79); FDD-LTE (bands 1, 2, 3, 4, 5, 7, 8, 11, 12, 13, 14, 17, 18, 19, 20, 21, 25, 26, 28, 29, 30, 32, 66, 71); UMTS/HSPA/DC-HSDPA (850, 900, 1900, 2100 MHz); A2408 / A2412: 5G NR (bands n1, n2, n3, n5, n7, n8, n12, n20, n25, n28, n38, n40, n41, n66, n77, n78, n79); FDD-LTE (bands 1, 2, 3, 4, 5, 7, 8, 12, 13, 17, 18, 19, 20, 25, 26, 28, 30, 32, 66); CDMA EV-DO Rev. A (800, 1900 MHz); UMTS/HSPA/DC-HSDPA (850, 900, 1700/2100, 1900, 2100 MHz); A2407 / A2411: 5G NR (bands n1, n2, n3, n5, n7, n8, n12, n20, n25, n28, n38, n40, n41, n66, n77, n78, n79); FDD-LTE (bands 1, 2, 3, 4, 5, 7, 8, 12, 13, 17, 18, 19, 20, 25, 26, 28, 30, 32, 66); UMTS/HSPA/DC-HSDPA (850, 900, 1700/2100, 1900, 2100 MHz)
- Data inputs: List of inputs: Multi-touch screen; LiDAR scanner; 3 microphones; Motion coprocessor; 3-axis gyroscope; 3-axis accelerometer; iBeacon; Barometer; Digital compass; Proximity sensor; Ambient light sensor; Face ID
- Water resistance: IP68, up to 6 m (20 ft) for 30 minutes
- Codename: D53P /
- SAR: 12 Pro: Model A2341 Head: 1.16 W/kg Body: 1.17 W/kg; Model A2406 Head: 1.17 W/kg Body: 1.19 W/kg; Model A2407 / A2408 / A2409 Head: 1.18 W/kg Body: 1.14 W/kg; 12 Pro Max: Model A2342 Head: 1.17 W/kg Body: 1.19 W/kg; Model A2410 Head: 1.17 W/kg Body: 1.120 W/kg; Model A2411 / A2412 / A2413 Head: 1.19 W/kg Body: 1.17 W/kg
- Hearing aid compatibility: M3, T4
- Made in: China
- Other: FaceTime Audio / Video; Wi-Fi Hotspot; Voice over LTE (VoLTE); Wi-Fi Calling
- Website: iPhone 12 Pro – Apple at the Wayback Machine (archived October 13, 2020)

The iPhone 12 Pro and iPhone 12 Pro Max are smartphones developed and marketed by Apple. They are the flagship smartphones in the fourteenth generation of the iPhone, succeeding the iPhone 11 Pro and Pro Max, respectively. They were unveiled alongside the iPhone 12 and iPhone 12 Mini at an Apple Special Event at Apple Park in Cupertino, California, on October 13, 2020, with the iPhone 12 Pro being released on October 23, 2020, and the iPhone 12 Pro Max on November 13, 2020. They were discontinued on September 14, 2021, along with the iPhone XR, following the announcement of the iPhone 13 and iPhone 13 Pro.

Major upgrades over the iPhone 11 Pro and iPhone 11 Pro Max include the addition of 5G support, the lidar sensor, ProRAW (DNG) allowing high quality lossless 12-bit image capture in the native photos app with the use of the new DNG v1.6 specification, the introduction of the MagSafe wireless charging and accessory system, the Apple A14 Bionic system on a chip (SoC), high-dynamic-range video Dolby Vision 10-bit 4:2:0 4K video recording at 30 or 60 fps, larger 6.1-inch and 6.7-inch displays on the iPhone 12 Pro and iPhone 12 Pro Max, respectively, and the move to a base capacity of 128 GB from the prior base capacity of 64 GB, while retaining the other storage capacities of 256 and 512 GB.

The iPhone 12 Pro and iPhone 12 Pro Max, like the iPhone 12 and iPhone 12 Mini, are the first iPhone models from Apple to no longer include a power adapter or EarPods headphones found in prior iPhone models; however, a USB-C to Lightning cable is still included, and this change was retroactively applied to other iPhone models sold by Apple at the time, including the iPhone XR, iPhone 11 and iPhone SE (2nd generation).

== History ==
=== Official announcement ===
The iPhone 12 Pro and iPhone 12 Pro Max were officially announced by Apple on October 13, 2020, during a virtual press event held at the Steve Jobs Theater at Apple Park in Cupertino, California. The event was conducted alongside the announcement of the iPhone 12, iPhone 12 Mini, and HomePod Mini.

The iPhone 12 Pro and iPhone 12 Pro Max alongside the rest of the iPhone 12 lineup were the first flagship iPhones to be announced at a pre-recorded broadcast event rather than a live on-stage event, and announced in the month of October instead of September due to the COVID-19 lockdowns. Apple would continue to announce future iPhones this way even after the end of the pandemic and return of its in-person events.

=== Launch and availability ===
Pre-orders for the iPhone 12 Pro began on October 16, 2020, with the official release taking place on October 23, 2020. This release coincided with the launch of the fourth-generation iPad Air and the standard iPhone 12. The iPhone 12 Pro Max followed a staggered release schedule, with pre-orders commencing on November 6, 2020, and an official release date of November 13, 2020, alongside the iPhone 12 Mini.

The pricing for the iPhone 12 Pro started at $999, while the iPhone 12 Pro Max began at $1099. This marked the first time since the launch of the iPhone XS and iPhone XR in 2018 that multiple iPhone models were announced together but not released simultaneously.

=== Discontinuation and reintroduction ===
On September 14, 2021, following the announcement of the iPhone 13 Pro and iPhone 13 Pro Max, the iPhone 12 Pro and iPhone 12 Pro Max were officially discontinued and removed from sale on Apple's website. However, in March 2022, Apple resumed selling refurbished iPhone 12 Pro models starting at $759 through its Refurbished and Clearance section. The iPhone 12 Pro Max, however, was not made available as a refurbished option.

The iPhone 12 series introduced several significant technological advancements, such as the inclusion of a Super Retina XDR display, improved camera capabilities, and support for 5G connectivity. It received positive reviews for its design, performance, and new features, making it one of the top-selling smartphone series of its release year.

== Design ==
It is the first major redesign since the iPhone X, similar to that of iPad Pros since 2018 and the 4th-generation iPad Air. The iPhone 12 Pro and 12 Pro Max feature a flat chassis, a design seen with the iPhone 4 through the iPhone 5S and the first generation iPhone SE. Like the iPhone 12 and 12 Mini, the iPhone 12 Pro and 12 Pro Max are the last models to feature the original notch, and the notch size is similar to previous models. The bezels are around 35% thinner than the iPhone 11 Pro and previous models.

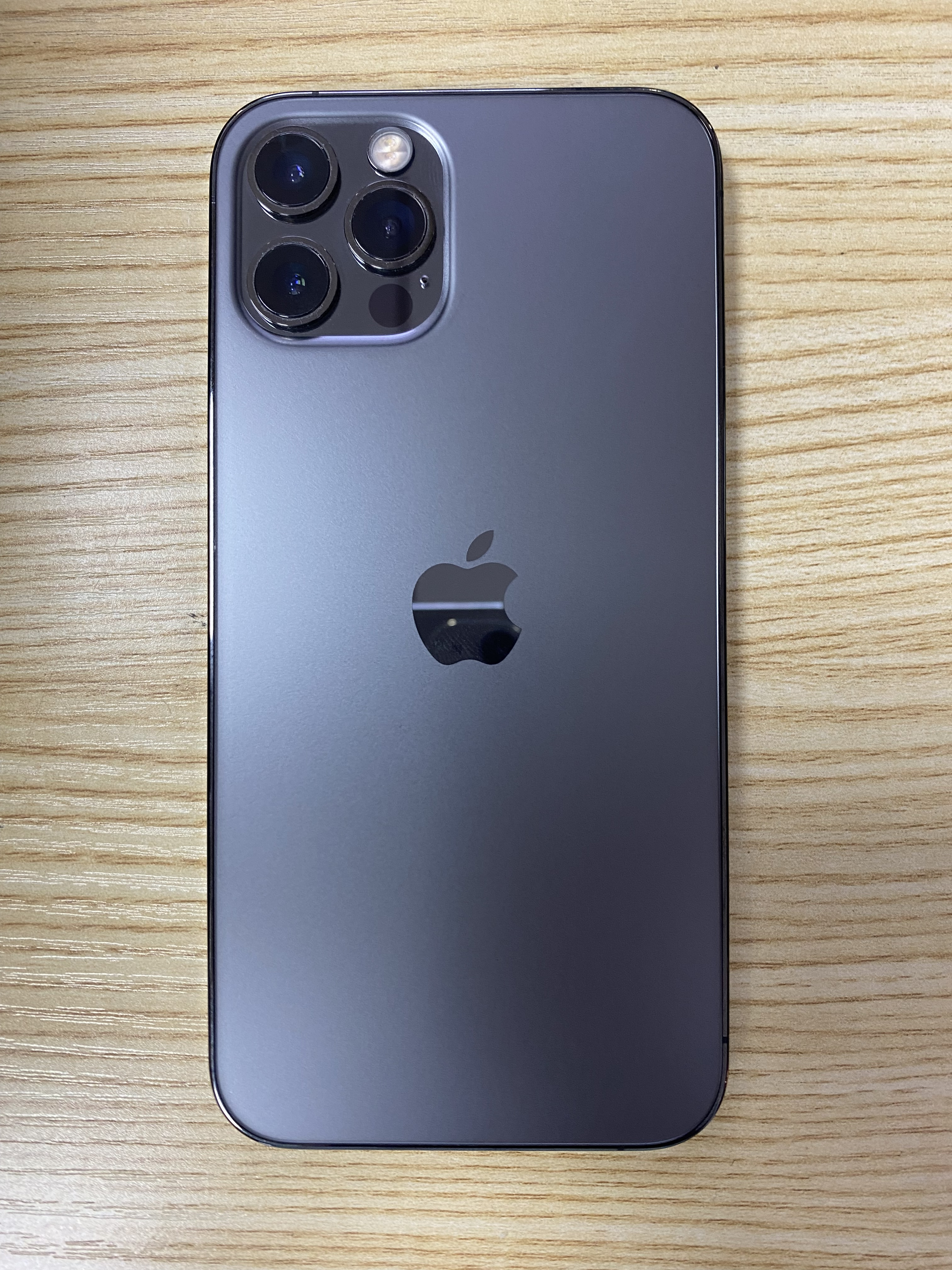
Back of iPhone 12 Pro in Graphite

The new design also comes with Corning Inc’s custom ceramic-hardened (i.e., glass ceramic) front glass, "Ceramic Shield", while the back retains the previous generation of Corning Inc's custom Dual-Ion Exchange strengthened glass. On the back is the same three-camera configuration found on the iPhone 11 Pro, but with larger apertures and an added LiDAR scanner.

The iPhone 12 Pro and 12 Pro Max are available in four colors: Silver, Graphite, Gold, and Pacific Blue. Pacific Blue is a new color replacing Midnight Green, while Graphite is a renamed version of Space Gray and Gold is now updated in the new yellow gold introduced with the Apple Watch Series 6.

Color	Name
	Silver
	Graphite
	Gold
	Pacific Blue

== Specifications ==
=== Hardware ===
The iPhone 12 Pro uses Apple's six-core A14 Bionic processor, which contains a 16-core neural engine. It has three internal storage options: 128, 256, and 512 GB. The iPhone 12 Pro has an IP68 water and dust-resistant rating, offering protection against dirt and grime, and is water-resistant up to six meters (20 feet) for 30 minutes. However, the manufacturer warranty does not cover liquid damage to the phone.

The iPhone 12 Pro, like the iPhone 12, is not supplied with EarPods (except in France) or the power adapter included with prior iPhone models. Apple claims this will reduce carbon emissions and that most users already own these items. Apple still supplies the USB-C to Lightning cable that was introduced with the iPhone 11 Pro. In addition to Lightning and Qi wireless charging, the phones introduce MagSafe wireless charging, a new magnet-based charging and accessory system that allow accessories such as chargers and cases to snap onto the back of the phones. MagSafe wireless charging supports up to 15 watts, is fast-charge capable, and is a reimagining of the MagSafe brand that was introduced in 2006 with the original MacBook Pro. The MagSafe Charger can be purchased separately, along with a variety of cases and other accessories.

The iPhone 12 Pro and 12 Pro Max support 5G cellular communications. This allows upload speeds of up to 200 Mbit/s and download speeds of up to 4 Gbit/s. However, only models sold in the U.S. support the faster mmWave technology; those sold elsewhere in the world, including Canada, only support sub-6 GHz frequency bands. A new feature called Smart Data Mode provides 5G only when necessary to preserve battery life and data usage.

==== Displays ====
The iPhone 12 Pro has a 6.06 inch (154 mm) (marketed as 6.1 inch) OLED display with a resolution of 2532×1170 pixels (2.9 MP) at 460 ppi, while the iPhone 12 Pro Max has a 6.68-inch (170 mm) (marketed as 6.7-inch) OLED display with a resolution of 2778×1284 pixels (3.5 MP) at 458 PPI. Both models have the Super Retina XDR OLED display with thinner bezels than previous generation iPhones. The iPhone 12 Pro Max features the largest display on any iPhone to date.

The phones also introduce a new glass-ceramic covering, named 'Ceramic Shield', which was co-developed with Corning Inc. Apple claims the Ceramic Shield has "4 times better drop performance" and that it is "tougher than any smartphone glass".

==== Batteries ====
The iPhone 12 Pro is supplied with a 10.78 Wh (2,815 mAh) battery, a slight decrease from the 11.67 Wh (3,046 mAh) battery found in the iPhone 11 Pro, and is identical to the battery found in the standard iPhone 12. The iPhone 12 Pro Max has a 14.13 Wh (3,687 mAh) battery, another slight decrease from the 15.04 Wh (3,969 mAh) battery found in the iPhone 11 Pro Max. The battery is not user-replaceable.

==== Chipsets ====
Both the iPhone 12 Pro and iPhone 12 Pro Max are supplied with the Apple A14 Bionic, the first ARM-based smartphone system-on-a-chip (SoC) manufactured on the 5 nm process node. However, unlike previous years, the iPhone 12 Pro and iPhone 12 Pro Max are not the first Apple devices to receive the newest A-series processor, with the fourth-generation iPad Air being the first device from Apple to contain the A14 Bionic chip.

The iPhone 12 Pro and iPhone 12 Pro Max also contain the Apple M14 motion coprocessor. The iPhone 12 Pro and iPhone 12 Pro Max use Qualcomm's X55 5G modem.

==== Cameras ====
The iPhone 12 Pro features four cameras: one front-facing camera and three back-facing cameras, including a telephoto, wide, and ultra-wide camera. The iPhone 12 Pro also features a lidar scanner for AR and computer-aided photo enhancement services. The iPhone 12 Pro also adds Night Mode for time-lapse video recording on all four cameras.

Unlike the iPhone 11 Pro and iPhone 11 Pro Max where the only difference was the screen size and battery capacity, the iPhone 12 Pro Max adds a 47% larger sensor and sensor-shift image stabilization to the main camera lens, and replaces the f/2.0 aperture 52 mm telephoto camera lens with a f/2.2 aperture 65 mm lens, allowing for a 2.5x optical zoom. The iPhone 12 Pro and iPhone 12 Pro Max are the first smartphones capable of shooting in 10-bit high dynamic range Dolby Vision 4K video at up to 60 frames per second.

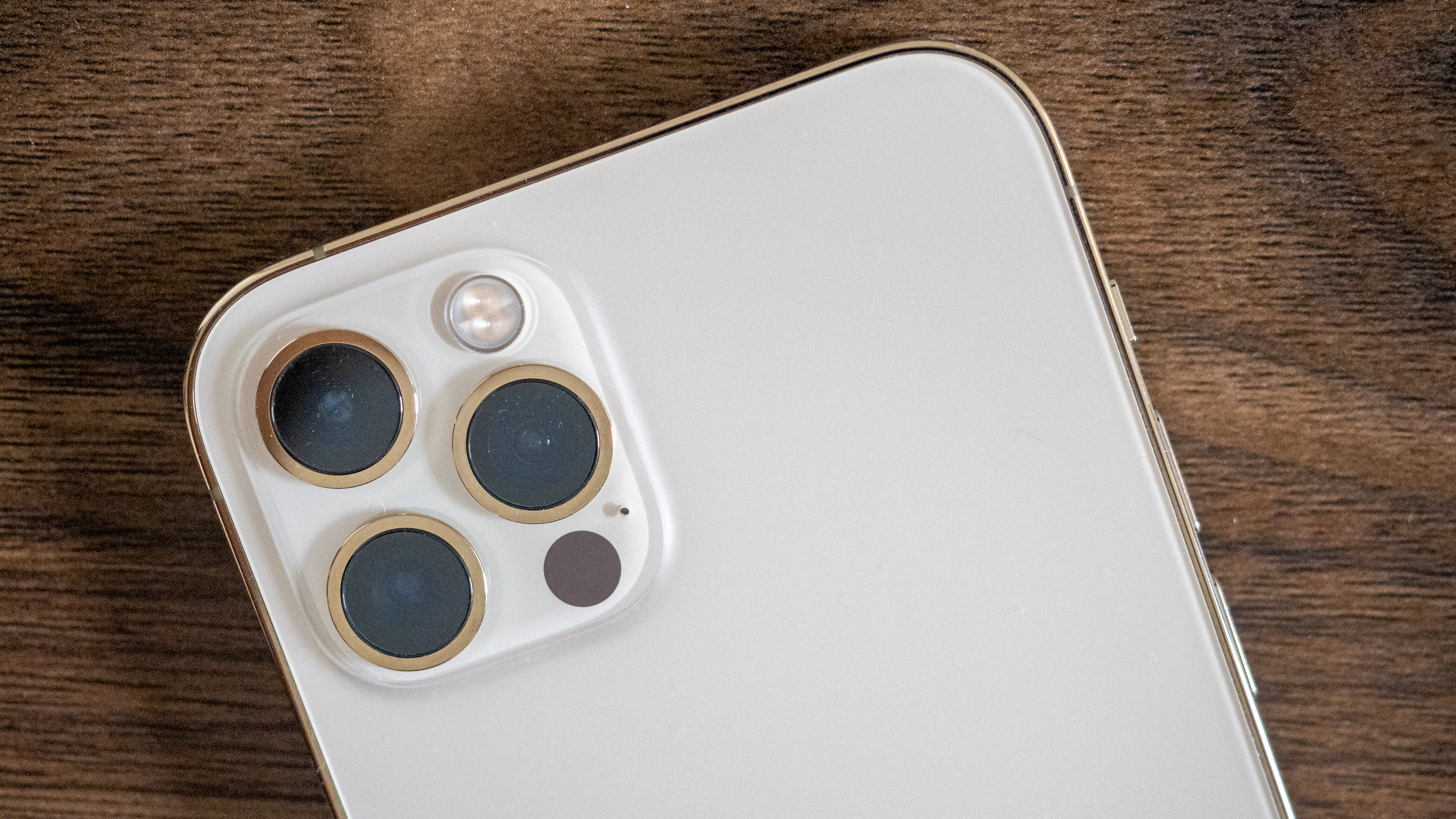
The cameras of the iPhone 12 Pro

==== Sensors ====
The iPhone 12 Pro and iPhone 12 Pro Max have largely the same sensors found on prior iPhone models going back to the iPhone X. These include an accelerometer, gyroscope, barometer, proximity sensor, ambient light sensor, and a digital compass. The devices also include the Face ID facial recognition system, this is made up of several sensors: mainly a dot projector, flood illuminator, and an infrared camera, allowing a user's face to be scanned and stored by the Secure Enclave. A lidar scanner is the new sensor included in the 12 Pro and 12 Pro Max, similar to that of the fourth-generation iPad Pro, permitting additional augmented reality (AR) features to also be supported, such as the ability to measure a user's approximate height from the Measure app.

=== Software ===
The iPhone 12 Pro and iPhone 12 Pro Max feature iOS, Apple's mobile operating system. The user interface of iOS is based on the concept of direct manipulation, using multi-touch gestures. Interface control elements consist of sliders, switches, and buttons. Interaction with the OS includes gestures such as swipe, tap, pinch, and reverse pinch, all of which have specific definitions within the context of the iOS operating system and its multi-touch interface. Internal accelerometers are used by some applications to respond to shaking the device (one common result is the undo command) or rotating it vertically (one common result is switching from portrait to landscape mode).

The iPhone 12 Pro was first supplied with iOS 14.1 alongside the iPhone 12 while the iPhone 12 Pro Max was supplied with iOS 14.2 alongside the iPhone 12 Mini. These phones come with the stock iOS apps, such as Safari, Weather, and Messages, and they also include Siri, the personal assistant included in iOS since iOS 5 with the release of the iPhone 4S.

These phones support the current public release of iOS, which is currently iOS 26.

== Reception ==
The iPhone 12 Pro received generally positive reviews. The Verge called it a "beautiful, powerful, and incredibly capable device", praising the new design reminiscent of the iPhone 5, the speed of the A14 Bionic processor, and its 5G capabilities, (Note: Only the United States variant of the iPhone 12 Pro, model A2341, supports mmWave (millimeter wave) 5G, meaning that users in other markets and countries do not benefit from the faster speeds of that type of 5G.) but noted the decrease in battery life compared to the iPhone 11 Pro and the low number of upgrades compared to the iPhone 12.

Engadget also gave the iPhone 12 Pro a positive review, praising the MagSafe wireless charging and accessory system as well as the improved camera system, but noted the lack of upgrade motivation if users had already purchased a new iPhone in 2019.

Apple was criticized for the continued reliance on Face ID as the sole biometric option to unlock the device, which is incompatible with face masks. This limitation was lifted with the introduction of the iOS 14.5, which permits the user to unlock the phone while wearing a face mask, using the paired and password unlocked Apple Watch as its alternative authenticator. The iPhone SE (3rd generation) was the last phone produced by Apple that supports Touch ID, an alternative option that is compatible with face masks. All models can still use a passcode to log in.

=== "OLED-gate" ===
Within two weeks of its public release, a thread was started at Apple Support describing a problem with pixels on the iPhone 12 and iPhone 12 Pro OLED displays not shutting off completely in black scenes, resulting in what was described as an "ugly glowing"; over 3,500 other users have since clicked the "I have this question too" button in the thread. Additional users have provided photos and videos online that demonstrate the problem; one of whom—whose video amassed over 50,000 views—claims Apple responded that they were working on the problem. However, Apple has not officially acknowledged the problem, which persists despite multiple software updates, leading users and pundits to fear a hardware problem.

=== Removal of the power adapter and EarPods ===
Apple, through an "environmental initiative", have removed the EarPods (except in France until January 31, 2022) and power adapter (except in São Paulo) from all new iPhone boxes, including the iPhone 12 and iPhone 12 Pro. According to Apple, removing the power adapter permitted Apple to avoid 180, 000 metric tons of CO_{2} in fiscal year 2021 thanks to a shift in the mode of transport and product weight.

Apple now includes a USB-C to Lightning cable, incompatible with the existing USB-A power adapters that Apple previously supplied with its devices. Users can still use their existing USB-A power adapters and Lightning cables to charge and sync, but must purchase or use an existing USB-C power adapter to utilize the included USB-C to Lightning cable. Starting with the iPhone 8, a USB Power Delivery (USB-PD) compliant charger is required to permit fast charging when using the USB-C to Lightning cable, with Apple suggesting the use of a 20W or greater USB-PD compliant charger to fast charge the iPhone 12.

== Environmental data ==
=== Carbon footprint ===
The iPhone 12 Pro has a carbon footprint of 82 kg (181 lb) of CO_{2} emissions, which is 6 kilograms (13 pounds) more than the preceding iPhone 11 Pro. The iPhone 12 Pro Max has a footprint of 86 kg (190 lb) of carbon emissions, a 6 kilograms (13 pounds) increase compared to the iPhone 11 Pro Max.

Of all emissions, 86% and 82% released by producing the iPhone 12 Pro and iPhone 12 Pro Max respectively are caused by device production and primary resource use with the remaining emissions released by means of first use, transportation, and end-of-life processing.

=== Repairing ===
Several weeks after its release, it was discovered by iFixit and Australian tech YouTuber Hugh Jeffreys that a number of key components such as the cameras malfunction or display warnings if they are replaced with new or those taken from an otherwise identical donor unit.

Internal Apple documents also mention that, beginning with the iPhone 12 and continuing with subsequent models, authorized technicians would have to run the phones through an internal System Configuration tool to reprogram repaired units in order to account for hardware changes. While Apple has yet to comment on the issue, the inability to replace key system components have raised concerns about repairing and planned obsolescence.

== See also ==
- History of the iPhone
- List of iPhone models
- Timeline of iPhone models

== Explanatory notes ==
Preceded by iPhone 11 Pro / 11 Pro Max	iPhone; 14th generation alongside iPhone 12 / 12 Mini	Succeeded by iPhone 13 Pro / 13 Pro Max
