= Bkav =

Vietnamese company

Bkav Corporation
- Native name: Công ty cổ phần Bkav
- Founded: 1995
- Founder: Nguyễn Tử Quảng
- Headquarters: Bkav Building, Yen Hoa New Town, Cau Giay District, Hanoi, Vietnam
- Key people: Nguyễn Tử Quảng (CEO)
- Revenue: 200 billion VND (2019)
- Net income: 11 billion VND
- Website: www.bkav.com

Bkav is a Vietnamese security software and electronics company based in Hanoi. It has grown to be the most popular anti-virus software provider in Vietnam, capturing over 70% of the domestic market. The name of the company was based on "Bách Khoa AntiVirus", as it was founded as a spin-off of the Hanoi University of Science and Technology (Đại học Bách khoa Hà Nội) Internetwork Security center by student Nguyễn Tử Quảng.

The company has been noted for exposing security breaches in popular products such as the iPhone X Face ID.

In 2015, the company released their first, in-house developed, smartphone, however it had poor reception and sales numbers. Bkav has also branched off to providing smart home products and security cameras.

== See also ==
- VinSmart
