= IPSW =

File format used in iTunes to install iOS firmware

- Filename extension: .ipsw
- Internet media type: application/x-itunes-ipsw
- Magic number: 504B0304
- Developed by: Apple
- Type of format: Archive

IPSW is a file format used to install iOS, iPadOS, tvOS, HomePod, watchOS, and most recently, macOS firmware for devices equipped with Apple silicon. All Apple devices share the same IPSW file format for iOS firmware and their derivatives, allowing users to flash their devices through Finder or iTunes on macOS or Windows, respectively. Users can flash Apple silicon Macs through Apple Configurator 2.

== Structure ==
The .ipsw file itself is a compressed archive file (renamed Zip archive) containing at least three Apple Disk Image files with one containing the root file system of the OS and two ram disks for restore and update. tvOS, audioOS and macOS also include a disk image for the recovery environment (recoveryOS).

The file also holds the kernel caches, and a "Firmware" folder which contains iBoot, LLB (Low-Level Bootloader), iBSS (iBoot Single Stage), iBEC (iBoot Epoch Change), the Secure Enclave Processor firmware, the Device Tree, Firmware Images (Apple logo, battery images, Recovery mode screen and more), baseband firmware files in .bbfw format (renamed zip file), and other firmware files.

There are two more files named "BuildManifest.plist" and "Restore.plist", both property lists that contain compatibility information and SHA-256 hashes for different components.

BuildManifest.plist is sent to Apple's TSS server and checked in order to obtain SHSH blobs before every restore. Without SHSH blobs, the device will refuse to restore, thus making downgrades very difficult to achieve. The IPSW file format plays a crucial role in managing the software updates and restores for a variety of Apple devices. Its use extends beyond just iPhones and iPads, as it now also covers Apple silicon Macs, which can be updated using Apple Configurator 2. These files are integral to the device's firmware and contain various critical components needed for proper functioning, such as the kernel, device drivers, and booting files. The careful organization of these components ensures that the device not only runs smoothly after an update or restore but also maintains security by verifying the integrity of the firmware files.

The inclusion of SHSH blobs, which are required for validating firmware restoration, further demonstrates the controlled environment that Apple enforces for updates and downgrades. These mechanisms help prevent users from inadvertently downgrading to insecure or outdated versions, protecting the security of the devices and the integrity of the Apple ecosystem as a whole.

== Security and rooting ==
The archive is not password-protected, but iBoot, LLB, iBEC, iBSS, iBootData and the Secure Enclave Processor firmware images inside it are encrypted with AES. Until iOS 10, all the firmware files (including the root file system and Restore and Update ramdisks) were encrypted. While Apple does not release these keys, they can be extracted using different iBoot or bootloader exploits, such as limera1n (created by George Hotz, more commonly known as geohot). Since then, many tools were created for the decryption and modification of the root file system.

=== Government data access ===
After the 2015 San Bernardino attack, the FBI recovered the shooter's iPhone 5C, which belonged to the San Bernardino County Department of Public Health. The FBI recovered iCloud backups from one and a half months before the shooting, and wanted to access encrypted files on the device. The U.S. government ordered Apple to produce an IPSW file that would allow investigators to brute force the passcode of the iPhone. The order used the All Writs Act, originally created by the Judiciary Act of 1789, to demand the firmware, in the same way as other smartphone manufacturers have been ordered to comply.

Tim Cook responded on the company's webpage, outlining a need for encryption, and arguing that if they produce a backdoor for one device, it would inevitably be used to compromise the privacy of other iPhone users:

The FBI wants us to make a new version of the iPhone operating system, circumventing several important security features, and install it on an iPhone recovered during the investigation. In the wrong hands, this software — which does not exist today — would have the potential to unlock any iPhone in someone’s physical possession...

The government would have us remove security features and add new capabilities to the operating system, allowing a passcode to be input electronically. This would make it easier to unlock an iPhone by “brute force,” trying thousands or millions of combinations with the speed of a modern computer.

The implications of the government’s demands are chilling. If the government can use the All Writs Act to make it easier to unlock your iPhone, it would have the power to reach into anyone’s device to capture their data. The government could extend this breach of privacy and demand that Apple build surveillance software to intercept your messages, access your health records or financial data, track your location, or even access your phone’s microphone or camera without your knowledge.

Opposing this order is not something we take lightly. We feel we must speak up in the face of what we see as an overreach by the U.S. government.

== Signed iOS/iPadOS versions ==
Note: This table provides a general overview of which OS can be successfully installed on each device. Missing devices continue to receive major OS updates or do not have IPSWs available.

iPhone 2G and iPod Touch 1 do not have signing, and any supported iPhoneOS version can be freely installed.

Apple Silicon Macs have all releases signed, excluding betas.

=== iPhone ===
Device	Signed iOS Versions
iPhone 3G	4.2.1, 4.1 (3.1.3 and below do not use signing)
iPhone 3GS	6.1.6, 4.1
iPhone 4 (GSM), (GSM / 2012), and (CDMA)	7.1.2
iPhone 4S	9.3.6, 9.3.5, 8.4.1 (OTA update only), 6.1.3 (OTA update only)
iPhone 5 (GSM / Global)	10.3.4, 10.3.3, 8.4.1 (OTA update only)
iPhone 5c (GSM / Global)	10.3.4, 10.3.3
iPhone 5s (GSM / Global)	12.5.8, 10.3.3 (OTA update only)
iPhone 6 / 6+	12.5.8
iPhone 6S / 6S+, iPhone SE, iPhone 7 / 7 Plus (Global / GSM)	15.8.8
iPhone 8 / 8+, iPhone X	16.7.16
iPhone XS / XS Max, iPhone XR	18.7.10

=== iPad ===
Device	Signed iOS / iPadOS Versions
iPad 1	5.1.1
iPad 2 (Wi-Fi / GSM)	9.3.5, 8.4.1 (OTA update only), 6.1.3 (OTA update only)
iPad 2 (CDMA)	9.3.6, 9.3.5, 8.4.1 (OTA update only), 6.1.3 (OTA update only)
iPad 2 (Mid 2012), iPad 3 (CDMA / GSM), iPad mini (GSM / Global / China)	9.3.6, 9.3.5, 8.4.1 (OTA update only)
iPad 3 (Wi-Fi), iPad mini (Wi-Fi)	9.3.5, 8.4.1 (OTA update only)
iPad 4 (Wi-Fi)	10.3.3, 8.4.1 (OTA update only)
iPad 4 (GSM / Global)	10.3.4, 10.3.3, 8.4.1 (OTA update only)
iPad Air (Wi-Fi / Cellular / China), iPad mini 2 (Wi-Fi / Cellular)	12.5.8, 10.3.3 (OTA update only)
iPad mini 2 (China), iPad mini 3 (Wi-Fi / Cellular / China)	12.5.8
iPad Air 2 (Wi-Fi / Cellular), iPad mini 4 (Wi-Fi / Cellular)	15.8.8
iPad Pro 12.9-inch (Wi-Fi / Cellular), iPad Pro 9.7-inch (Wi-Fi / Cellular), iPad 5 (Wi-Fi / Cellular)	16.7.16
iPad Pro (12.9-inch 2nd Generation, Wi-Fi / Cellular), iPad Pro (10.5-inch, Wi-Fi / Cellular), iPad 6 (Wi-Fi / Cellular)	17.7.11
iPad 7 (Wi-Fi / Cellular)	18.7.10
iPad Pro (12.9-inch 3rd Generation, Wi-Fi / Cellular), iPad Pro (11-inch, Wi-Fi / Cellular), iPad Air 3 (Wi-Fi / Cellular), iPad Mini 5 (Wi-Fi / Cellular), iPad 8 (Wi-Fi / Cellular)	26.7

=== iPod Touch ===
Device	Signed iOS Versions
iPod Touch 2	4.2.1, 4.1 (3.1.3 and below do not use signing)
iPod Touch 3	5.1.1, 4.1
iPod Touch 4	6.1.6
iPod Touch 5	9.3.5, 8.4.1 (OTA update only)
iPod Touch 6	12.5.8
iPod Touch 7	15.8.8

=== Apple TV ===
Device	Signed tvOS Versions
Apple TV (2nd Generation)	6.2.1, 5.3
Apple TV (3rd Generation)	7.9, 7.2.2, 5.3
Apple TV (3rd Generation, Rev A)	7.9, 7.2.2
Apple TV HD	26.6, 18.3 (OTA update only), 13.4.8, 10.2.2

=== HomePod ===
Device	Signed audioOS Versions
HomePod Mini	26.6, 18.3 (OTA update only)
