= Apple A14 =

System-on-a-chip designed by Apple Inc.

Apple A14 Bionic
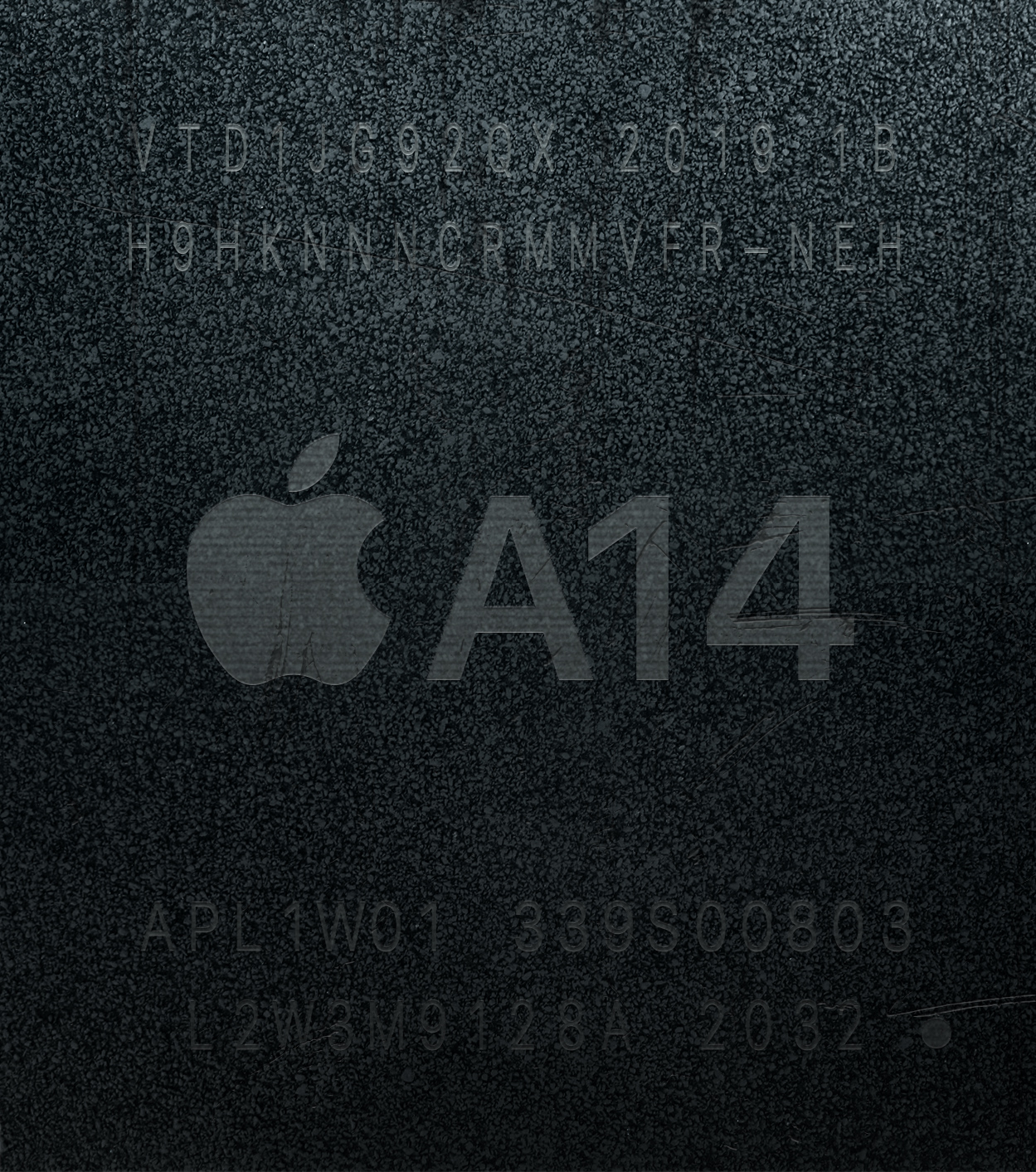

General information
- Launched: September 15, 2020
- Discontinued: March 4, 2025
- Designed by: Apple Inc.
- Common manufacturer: TSMC
- Product code: APL1W01
- Max. CPU clock rate: to 3.0 GHz

Physical specifications
- Transistors: 11.8 billion
- Cores: 6 (ARM big.LITTLE: 2 "big" Firestorm + 4 "little" Icestorm)
- GPU: Apple-designed 4 core

Cache
- L2 cache: 8 MB (performance cores); 4 MB (efficient cores)
- L4 cache: 16 MB (system cache)

Architecture and classification
- Application: Mobile
- Technology node: 5 nm (TSMC N5)
- Microarchitecture: "Firestorm" and "Icestorm"
- Instruction set: ARMv8.4-A

Products, models, variants
- Variant: Apple M1

History
- Predecessor: Apple A13 Bionic
- Successors: Apple A15 Bionic (iPhone); Apple A16 Bionic (iPad); Apple M1 (iPad Air)

The Apple A14 Bionic is a 64-bit, ARMv8.4-A system on a chip (SoC). It is designed by Apple Inc. as part of the Apple silicon series. It appears in the iPad Air (4th generation) and iPad (10th generation), as well as iPhone 12 Mini, iPhone 12, iPhone 12 Pro, and iPhone 12 Pro Max. Apple states that the central processing unit (CPU) performs up to 40% faster than the A12, while the graphics processing unit (GPU) is up to 30% faster than the Apple A12. It also includes a 16-core neural engine and new machine learning matrix accelerators that perform twice and ten times as fast, respectively. The Apple A14 was discontinued on March 4, 2025, when the iPad (10th generation) was discontinued.

== Design ==
The Apple A14 Bionic features an Apple-designed 64-bit, six-core CPU, implementing ARMv8 with two high-performance cores called Firestorm and four energy-efficient cores called Icestorm.

The Apple A14 integrates an Apple-designed four-core GPU with 30% faster graphics performance than the A12. The A14 includes dedicated neural network hardware that Apple calls a new 16-core Neural Engine. The Neural Engine can perform 11 trillion operations per second. In addition to the separate Neural Engine, the A14 CPU includes second-generation machine learning matrix scalar multiplication accelerators (which Apple calls AMX blocks). The A14 also includes a new image processor with improved computational photography capabilities.

A14 is manufactured by TSMC on their first-generation 5 nm fabrication process, N5. This makes the A14 the first commercially available product to be manufactured on a 5 nm process node. The transistor count has increased to 11.8 billion, a 38.8% increase from the A13's transistor count of 8.5 billion. According to SemiAnalysis, the die size of A14 processor is 88 mm^{2}, with a transistor density of 134 million transistors per mm^{2}. It is manufactured in a package on package (PoP) together with 4 GB of LPDDR4X memory in the iPhone 12 and 6 GB of LPDDR4X memory in the iPhone 12 Pro.

The A14 has video codec encoding support for HEVC and H.264. It has decoding support for HEVC, H.264, MPEG‑4 Part 2, and Motion JPEG.

The Apple A14 would be later used as the basis for the M1 series of chips, used in various Macintosh and iPad models.

== Products that include the Apple A14 Bionic ==
- iPad (10th generation)
- iPad Air (4th generation)
- iPhone 12 & 12 Mini
- iPhone 12 Pro & 12 Pro Max

== Variants ==
The table below shows the various SoCs based on the "Firestorm" and "Icestorm" microarchitectures.

Variant	CPU cores (P+E)	GPU cores	GPU EU	Graphics ALU	Neural Engine cores	Neural Engine performance	Memory (GB)	Transistor count
A14	6 (2+4)	4	64	512	16	11 TOPS	4–6	11.8 billion
M1	8 (4+4)	7	112	896	16	11 TOPS	8–16	16 billion
M1	8 (4+4)	8	128	1024	16	11 TOPS	8–16	16 billion
M1 Pro	8 (6+2)	14	224	1792	16	11 TOPS	16–32	34 billion
M1 Pro	10 (8+2)	14	224	1792	16	11 TOPS	16–32	34 billion
M1 Pro	10 (8+2)	16	256	2048	16	11 TOPS	16–32	34 billion
M1 Max	10 (8+2)	24	384	3072	16	11 TOPS	32–64	57 billion
M1 Max	10 (8+2)	32	512	4096	16	11 TOPS	32–64	57 billion
M1 Ultra	20 (16+4)	48	768	6144	32	22 TOPS	64–128	114 billion
M1 Ultra	20 (16+4)	64	1024	8192	32	22 TOPS	64–128	114 billion

== See also ==
- Apple silicon
- Apple M1
- Comparison of Armv8-A processors
- GoFetch – security vulnerability within the Apple M2 first disclosed in 2024

Preceded by Apple A13 Bionic	Apple A14 Bionic; 2020	Succeeded by Apple A15 Bionic (iPhone); Apple M1 (iPad Air)
