= Apple A13 =

System-on-a-chip designed by Apple Inc.

Apple A13 Bionic
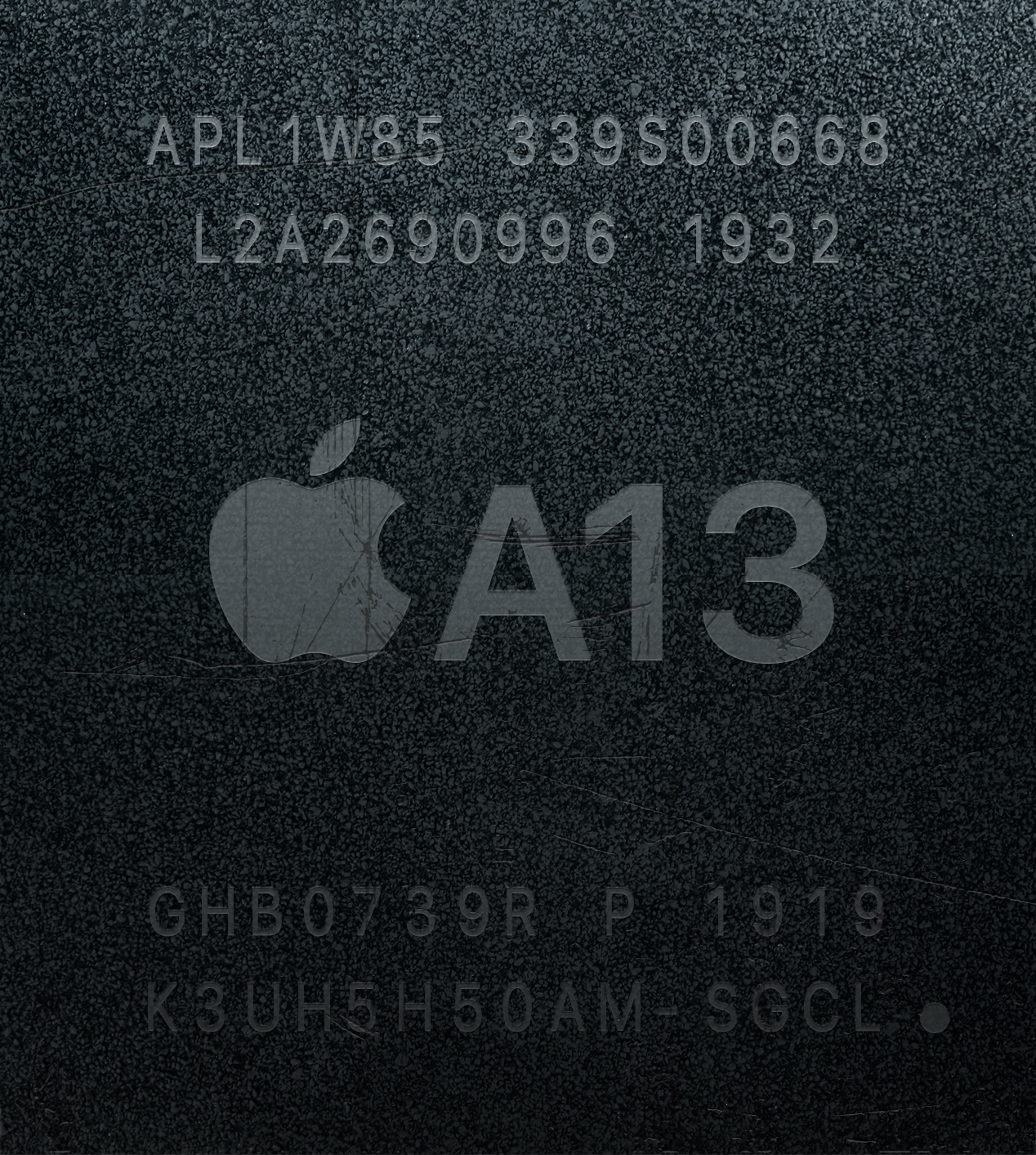

General information
- Launched: September 10, 2019
- Discontinued: March 3, 2026
- Designed by: Apple Inc.
- Common manufacturer: TSMC
- Max. CPU clock rate: to 2.65 GHz

Physical specifications
- Transistors: 8.5 billion
- Cores: 6 (ARM big.LITTLE: 2 "big" Lightning + 4 "little" Thunder)
- GPU: Apple-designed 4 core

Cache
- L2 cache: 8 MB (performance cores); 4 MB (efficient cores)
- Last level cache: 16 MB (system cache)

Architecture and classification
- Application: Mobile
- Technology node: 7 nm+ (TSMC N7P)
- Microarchitecture: "Lightning" and "Thunder"
- Instruction set: A64 ARMv8.4-A

Products, models, variants
- Variant: Apple S6/S7/S8 SiP (cut-down version that utilizes high efficiency cores from A13)

History
- Predecessors: Apple A12 Bionic (iPhone); Apple A12X/A12Z Bionic (iPad)
- Successor: Apple A14 Bionic

The Apple A13 Bionic is a 64-bit ARM-based system on a chip (SoC), designed by Apple Inc., part of the Apple silicon series. It appears in the iPhone 11, 11 Pro/Pro Max, the iPad (9th generation), the iPhone SE (2nd generation) and the Studio Display. Apple states that the two high performance cores are 20% faster with 30% lower power consumption than the Apple A12's, and the four high efficiency cores are 20% faster with 30% lower power consumption than the A12's.

All iPhones and iPads based on the A13 can be upgraded to iOS 26 or iPadOS 26 via over-the-air (OTA) update. These devices include the iPhone 11 series, the 2nd generation iPhone SE, and the 9th generation iPad.

== Design ==
The Apple A13 Bionic features an Apple-designed 64-bit six-core CPU implementing ARMv8.4-A ISA, with two high-performance cores running at 2.65 GHz called Lightning and four energy-efficient cores called Thunder. The Lightning cores feature machine learning accelerators called AMX blocks. Apple claims the AMX blocks are six times faster at matrix multiplication than the Apple A12's Vortex cores. The AMX blocks are capable of up to one trillion single-precision operations per second. The pair of Lightning cores share a 8 MB private L2 cache, while the four Thunder cores share a 4 MB L2. An additional 16 MB system level cache (SLC) serve as a on-chip last level cache, and is accessible to all components across the entire SoC.

The A13 integrates an Apple-designed four-core graphics processing unit (GPU), with 512 FP32 ALUs. Apple claimed the GPU to be 20% faster than its predecessor in the A12, or can alternatively achieve the same performance using 40% less power. A13's eight-core neural network accelerator is claimed to be 20% faster or can achieve the same performance as A12 while consuming 15% less power.

It is manufactured by TSMC on their 2nd generation 7 nm N7P (not to be confused with '7 nm+' or 'N7+'), and contains 8.5 billion transistors.

The A13 has video codec encoding support for HEVC and H.264. It has decoding support for HEVC, H.264, MPEG‑4 Part 2, and Motion JPEG.

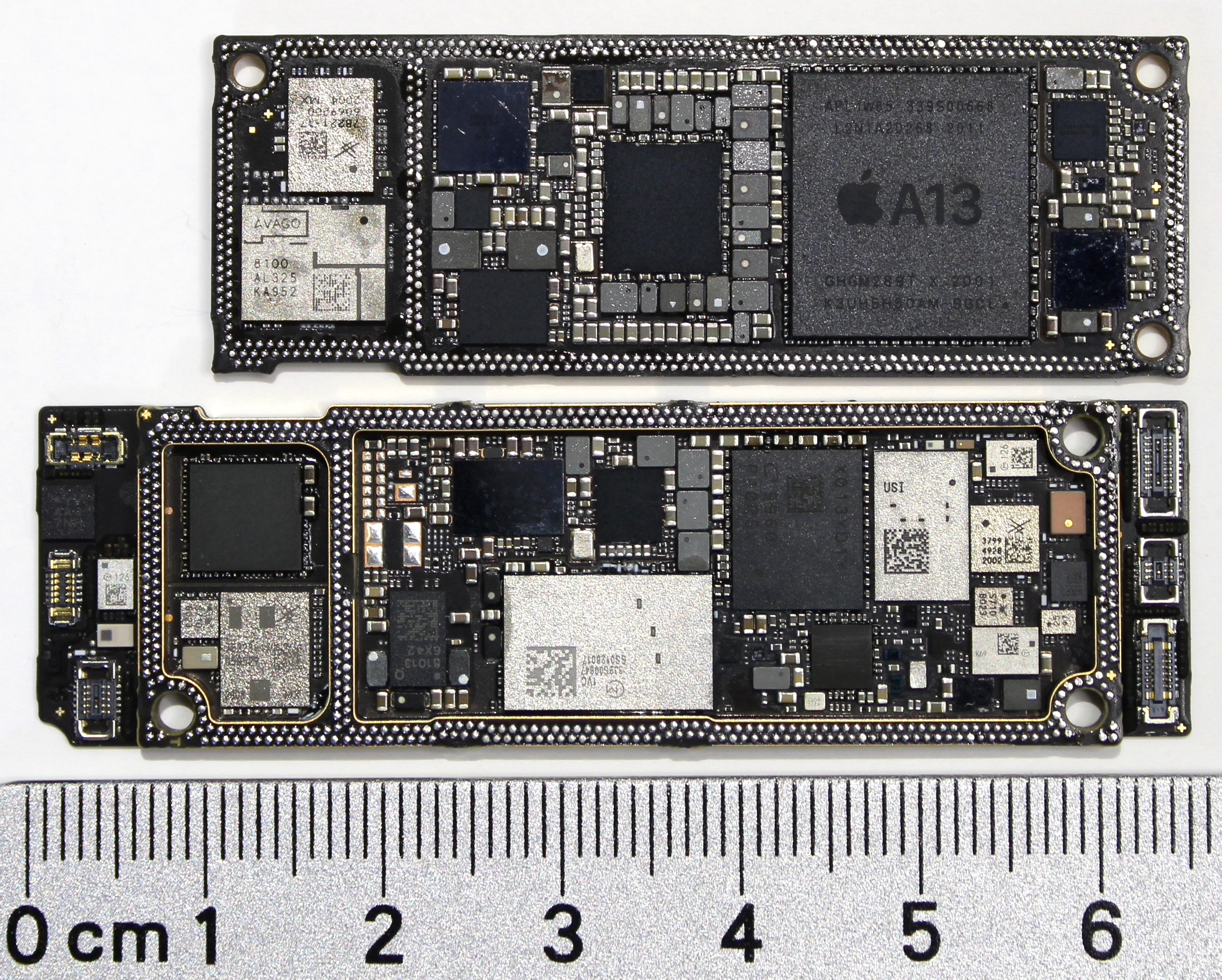
iPhone 11's logic boards. An A13 SoC can be seen on the upper board

Die block comparison (mm²)
SoC	A13 (7 nm enhanced)	A12 (7 nm)
Process node	TSMC N7P	TSMC N7
Total die	98.48	83.27
Big core	2.61	2.07
Small core	0.58	0.43
CPU complex (incl. cores)	13.47	11.16
GPU core	3.25	3.23
GPU total	15.28	14.88
NPU	4.64	5.79

== Products that include the Apple A13 Bionic ==
- iPhone 11
- iPhone 11 Pro & 11 Pro Max
- iPhone SE (2nd generation)
- iPad (9th generation)
- Apple Studio Display (first generation)

== See also ==
- Apple silicon, the range of ARM-based processors designed by Apple
- Apple M1
- Comparison of Armv8-A processors

Preceded by Apple A12 Bionic	Apple A13 Bionic; 2019	Succeeded by Apple A14 Bionic
