= AppValley =

Digital distribution service

- Developer: AppValley LLC
- Initial release: 2017
- Operating system: iOS
- Type: App store
- License: Proprietary (AppValley Web), AGPLv3 (AppValley Companion)
- Website: appvalley.signulous.com

AppValley is an independent American digital distribution service operated and trademarked by AppValley LLC. It serves as an alternative app store for the iOS mobile operating system, which allows users to download applications that are not available on the App Store, most commonly tweaked "++" apps, jailbreak apps, and apps including paid apps on the app store.

== Legality ==
AppValley is among several services that violate enterprise developer certificates from Apple. The terms under which these are granted make clear that they are for companies who wish to distribute apps to their employees. AppValley uses these certificates to distribute software directly to non-employees, thereby bypassing the AppStore. AppValley's conduct had implications in U.S. sanctioned markets like Iran, Iraq, North Korea, Cuba, and Venezuela, which have all been subject to commercial sanctions.

Among the software offered by AppValley and other services is pirated software, including paid apps on the app store and premium versions of Instagram, Spotify, Pokémon Go, and others. For instance, AppValley distributes an ad-free version of the music streaming app Spotify even on the free tier.

== History ==
The website was founded in May 2017, releasing late that month with a very basic version of the app. There were less than 100 apps available for download at this time. On Jan 19, 2018, a new version dubbed AppValley 2.0 was released bringing dark mode, more categories, a search, and a much faster interface. On February 14, 2019, a Chinese partner "Jason Wu" allegedly took control of the main Twitter account and domain, causing the original AppValley developers to migrate to the domain app-valley.vip and the Twitter account handle @App_Valley_vip. As of September 2024, the app-valley.vip domain now redirects to appvalley.signulous.com. Today, AppValley continues to offer an alternative to Apple's App Store where app developers can publish their applications.

== Features ==
AppValley is a mobile app installer which can also support iOS version that can be installed and downloaded on the mobile or the devices of the people who wish to get access to many different applications available. AppValley also contains apps that have been modified or tweaked for user preferences, and allows the user to by pass national restrictions on the use of apps, without having to resort to jailbreaking. As of June 2, 2020, there are over 1300 apps available for download.
