= Meikei Ieong =

Meikei Ieong from the TSMC Europe B.V, Amsterdam, Netherlands was named Fellow of the Institute of Electrical and Electronics Engineers (IEEE) in 2015 for leadership in development of advanced complementary metal-oxide-semiconductor device technologies.
