= IPhone 12 =

2020 smartphone by Apple

iPhone 12 iPhone 12 mini

- iPhone 12 in Blue
- Brand: Apple
- Manufacturers: Pegatron (on contract, sole supplier of iPhone 12 Mini); Foxconn (on contract)
- Type: Smartphone
- Generation: 14th generation
- First released: 12: October 23, 2020; 6 years ago 12 mini: November 13, 2020; 6 years ago
- Availability by region: 12: October 23, 2020: Australia; Austria; Belgium; Canada; Mainland China; Czech Republic; Denmark; Egypt; Finland; France; Germany; Hong Kong; Ireland; Italy; Japan; Mexico; Netherlands; New Zealand; Norway; Poland; Portugal; Russia; Saudi Arabia; Somalia; Singapore; Spain; Sweden; Switzerland; Taiwan; United Arab Emirates; United Kingdom; United States; October 30, 2020: South Korea; India; Brazil; Georgia; Qatar; November 6, 2020: Romania; Belarus; Serbia; November 13, 2020: Malaysia; November 27, 2020: Thailand; Vietnam; December 4, 2020: Sri Lanka; Turkey; December 14, 2020: Bangladesh; December 17, 2020: Israel; December 18, 2020: Indonesia; Philippines; South Africa; 12 mini: November 13, 2020: Australia; Austria; Belgium; Canada; China; Colombia; Czech Republic; Denmark; Finland; France; Germany; Hong Kong; Ireland; Italy; Japan; Luxembourg; Malaysia; Mexico; The Netherlands; New Zealand; North Macedonia; North Korea; Norway; Poland; Portugal; Russia; Saudi Arabia; Singapore; Slovenia; Spain; Sweden; Switzerland; Taiwan; United Arab Emirates; United Kingdom; United States; November 20, 2020: Brazil; India; South Korea; November 27, 2020: Thailand; Vietnam; December 4, 2020: Sri Lanka; December 11, 2020: Belarus; Serbia; December 17, 2020: Israel; December 18, 2020: Indonesia; Philippines; South Africa; December 23, 2020: Turkey
- Discontinued: 12 mini: September 7, 2022; 4 years ago 12: September 12, 2023; 3 years ago
- Predecessor: iPhone 11
- Successor: iPhone 13 and iPhone 13 Mini
- Related: iPhone 12 Pro and iPhone 12 Pro Max
- Compatible networks: 2G / 3G / 4G LTE / 5G
- Form factor: Slate
- Dimensions: 12: H: 146.7 mm (5.78 in); W: 71.5 mm (2.81 in); D: 7.4 mm (0.29 in); 12 mini: H: 131.5 mm (5.18 in); W: 64.2 mm (2.53 in); D: 7.4 mm (0.29 in)
- Weight: 12: 162 g (5.7 oz); 12 mini: 133 g (4.7 oz)
- Operating system: 12: Original: iOS 14.1 Current: iOS 27.2.1, released November 9, 2026; 12 mini: Original: iOS 14.2 Current: iOS 27.2.1, released November 9, 2026
- System-on-chip: A14 Bionic
- CPU: Hexa-core (2 "high performance" Firestorm @ 3.1 GHz + 4 "energy-saving" Icestorm)
- GPU: Apple-designed 4 core, up to 750 GFLOPS
- Modem: Qualcomm X55 5G
- Memory: 4 GB LPDDR4X
- Storage: 64, 128, 256 GB (Note: 1 GB = 1 billion bytes) NVMe
- Battery: 12: 3.83 V 10.78 Wh (2,815 mAh) Li-ion; 12 mini: 3.85 V 8.57 Wh (2,227 mAh) Li-ion
- Charging: Qi wireless charging (7.5 W); Lightning fast charging (20 W); MagSafe wireless charging (15 W/12 W (Mini))
- Rear camera: 12 MP, f/1.6, 26 mm (wide), 1.4 μm, dual pixel PDAF, OIS; 12 MP, f/2.4, 13 mm, 120° (ultrawide), 1/3.6"; Dual-LED dual-tone flash, HDR (photo/panorama); 4K@24/30/60fps, 1080p@30/60/120/240fps, HDR, Dolby Vision HDR (up to 30fps), stereo sound rec.
- Front camera: 12 MP, f/2.2, 23 mm (wide), 1/3.6"; HDR; 4K@24/30/60fps, 1080p@30/60/120fps, gyro-EIS
- Display: 12: 6.1 in (155 mm) diagonal Super Retina XDR OLED, 2532×1170px (460 ppi, aspect ratio 19.5:9), supplied by LG Display and Samsung Display; 12 mini: 5.4 in (137 mm) diagonal Super Retina XDR OLED, 2340×1080 px (476 ppi, aspect ratio 19.5:9), supplied by Samsung Display
- Sound: Spatial Audio, Dolby Atmos
- Connectivity: Wi-Fi 6 (802.11ax), Bluetooth 5.0, Ultra-wideband (UWB)
- Water resistance: IP68, up to 6 m (20 ft) for 30 minutes
- Made in: China
- Other: FaceTime audio- or video-calling, Voice over LTE
- Website: iPhone 12 at the Wayback Machine (archived September 14, 2021)

The iPhone 12 and iPhone 12 Mini (stylized and marketed as iPhone 12 mini) are smartphones that were developed and marketed by Apple. They are the fourteenth-generation iPhones, succeeding the iPhone 11. They were unveiled at a virtually held Apple Special Event at Apple Park in Cupertino, California, on October 13, 2020, alongside the "premium flagship" iPhone 12 Pro and iPhone 12 Pro Max and HomePod Mini. Pre-orders for the iPhone 12 started on October 16, 2020, and the phone was released in most countries on October 23, 2020, alongside the iPhone 12 Pro and fourth-generation iPad Air. Pre-orders for the iPhone 12 Mini began on November 6, 2020, and the phone was released on November 13, 2020, alongside the iPhone 12 Pro Max.

The major upgrades over the iPhone 11 include the addition of a Super Retina XDR OLED as opposed to the Liquid Retina LED-backlit LCD IPS panel on the iPhone 11 and XR, 5G support, the introduction of MagSafe, Apple A14 Bionic system on a chip (SoC) and high-dynamic-range video Dolby Vision 4K up to 30 fps. The iPhone 12 and iPhone 12 Mini, like the iPhone 12 Pro and iPhone 12 Pro Max, are the first iPhone models from Apple to no longer include a power adapter or EarPods headphones found in prior iPhone models; however, a USB-C to Lightning cable is included; this change was retroactively applied to other iPhone models sold by Apple, such as the iPhone XR, iPhone 11, and the second-generation iPhone SE. The iPhone 12 and 12 mini are the last non-budget models to feature 64 GB of internal storage (as the iPhone SE (3rd generation) still features 64 GB of internal storage), and are the last models to feature the original notch used since the iPhone X.

The iPhone 12 and 12 mini as well as the iPhone 12 Pro and 12 Pro Max are the first models to no longer feature native country codes for countries such as Malaysia, as they no longer include a power adapter in the box.

The iPhone 12 mini was discontinued and removed from Apple's website on September 7, 2022. The iPhone 12 was subsequently discontinued on September 12, 2023, with the launch of the iPhone 15 series.

== Design ==
The iPhone 12, 12 Mini, and 12 Pro are the first major redesign since the iPhone X. They feature a chassis with flat sides, similar to the iPhone 4 and iPhone 5 designs, as well as the iPad Pro since 2018, and the 4th-generation iPad Air, which was also released in 2020.

The iPhone 12 and 12 Mini as well as the iPhone 12 Pro and 12 Pro Max are the last iPhones to feature the original notch first introduced in the iPhone X, as the entire iPhone 13 series up to the iPhone 14 and 14 Plus as well as the iPhone 17e feature a smaller notch. The notch size is similar to previous iPhone models, despite speculation about a reduction in width.

The borders around the display are thinner by 35% than any previous model. The new design also comes with a ceramic-hardened front glass, marketed as Ceramic Shield, while the back retains the previous generation Dual-Ion Exchange strengthened glass.

On April 20, 2021, at Apple's “Spring Loaded” event, Apple revealed a new purple color option which became available on April 30, 2021.

The iPhone 12 and 12 Mini are available in six colors: Black, White, Product Red, Green, Blue, and Purple.

| Color | Name |
|---|---|
| | Black |
| | White |
| | Product Red |
| | Green |
| | Blue |
| | Purple |

== Specifications ==
=== Hardware ===
The iPhone 12 and iPhone 12 Mini use Apple's six-core A14 Bionic processor, which contains a next-generation neural engine. They both have three internal storage options: 64, 128, and 256 GB. Both also carry an IP68 water and dust resistance rating, providing protection against dirt and grime, and are water-resistant up to six meters (20 feet) for 30 minutes. However, the manufacturer warranty does not cover liquid damage to the phone.

The iPhone 12 series are the first iPhone models to be supplied from launch without EarPods or a wall adapter, which Apple says was done to reduce carbon emissions and waste since most users already own them. Apple also claims 70% more boxes can fit on a pallet given the smaller box, and thus further reducing emissions. A USB-C to Lightning cord is still included. This change also applies retroactively to all other iPhone models still in production. To comply with French law regarding wireless device radiation and health which requires phones to be bundled with and promote use of hands-free accessories by children under 14, iPhone models will still include EarPods in this market.

A magnetic connector known as MagSafe is introduced on the iPhone 12 models, allowing accessories such as cases and charging cords to be attached to the rear of the device. Accessories can also be stacked together.

These devices support 5G cellular communications. This allows upload speeds of up to 200 Mbit/s and download speeds of up to 4 Gbit/s. However, only models sold in the U.S. support the fastest mmWave technology; those sold elsewhere in the world, including Canada, support only sub-6 GHz frequency bands. A new feature called Smart Data Mode enables 5G only when necessary to preserve battery life.

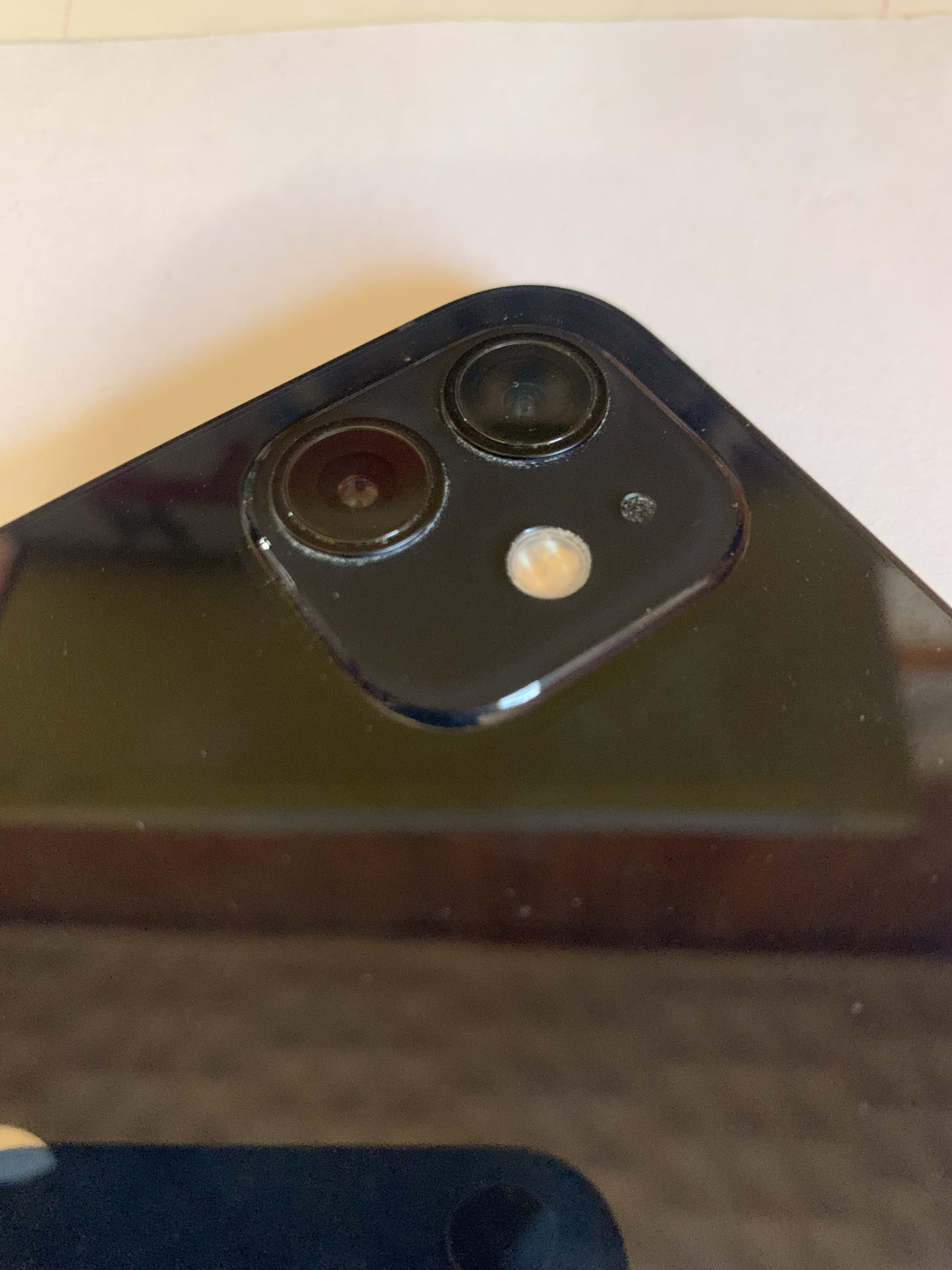
Black iPhone 12

==== Displays ====
The iPhone 12 models feature a 6.1-inch (155 mm) display with Super Retina XDR OLED technology at a resolution of 2532 × 1170 pixels and a pixel density of about 460 ppi. The iPhone 12 Mini features a 5.4-inch (137 mm) display with the same technology at a resolution of 2340 × 1080 pixels, and a pixel density of about 476 ppi. Both phones have a peak brightness of 1200 nits when viewing HDR content (equivalent to the peak brightness of the iPhone 12 Pro), and a normal brightness of 625 nits. Both phones also use an improved glass-ceramic covering called Ceramic Shield which is co-developed with Corning Inc. Apple describes it as having "4 times better drop performance" and being "tougher than any smartphone glass".

==== Batteries ====
The iPhone 12 has a 10.78 Wh (2,815 mAh) battery, a slight decrease from the 11.91 Wh (3,110 mAh) battery found in the iPhone 11. It is also identical to the battery found in the iPhone 12 Pro. The iPhone 12 Mini has an 8.57 Wh (2,227 mAh) battery. Like previous iPhones, the battery is not user-replaceable.

==== Chipsets ====
Both the iPhone 12 and 12 Mini have the Apple A14 Bionic, the first ARM-based smartphone system-on-a-chip (SoC) manufactured on the 5 nm process node. However, unlike previous years, they are not the first Apple devices to receive the newest A-series processor, with the fourth-generation iPad Air being the first. Both phones use Qualcomm's Snapdragon X55 5G modem.

==== Cameras ====
Both phones have two rear 12-megapixel cameras: wide and ultra-wide. The wide camera is a 26 mm full-frame equivalent with an f/1.6 aperture which captures 27% more light than the f/1.8 aperture in the iPhone 11 and a seven-element lens. The ultra-wide camera is a 13 mm full-frame equivalent with an f/2.4 aperture and a five-element lens.

All cameras now support Night Mode for both photo and time-lapse video at full resolution. Smart HDR has been improved thanks to Smart HDR 3. These iPhone models are the first capable of shooting 10-bit high dynamic range Dolby Vision 4K video at up to 30 fps which allows for greater brightness and deeper shadows.

The front-facing, TrueDepth camera features a 12-megapixel camera with an f/2.2 aperture. This model also added Night Mode to the front-facing camera.

Sensors

The iPhone 12 and 12 Mini include mostly the same sensors found on prior iPhone models going back to the iPhone X. These include an accelerometer, gyroscope, barometer, proximity sensor, ambient light sensor, and a digital compass. The devices also include the Face ID sensor for biometric authentication.

=== Software ===
Both phones originally shipped with iOS 14. The devices come with the stock iOS apps, such as Safari, Weather, and Messages, and they include Siri, the personal assistant in iOS. They received iOS 15 on September 20, 2021, iOS 16 on September 12, 2022, iOS 17 on September 18, 2023, iOS 18 on September 16, 2024, and iOS 26 on September 15, 2025. It also supports iOS 27, which was released in September 2026.

== Reception ==
The iPhone 12 received largely positive reviews. The Verge called it a "beautiful, powerful, and incredibly capable device", praising the new design reminiscent of the iPhone 5, the speed of the A14 Bionic processor, its 5G capabilities, addition of the OLED display like on the high end iPhones, combined with much slimmer bezels than previous iPhone models and improved battery life over iPhone 11. Engadget also gave the iPhone 12 a positive review, praising the MagSafe wireless charging and magnetic accessory attachment as well as the redesigned camera system, a greatly improved display like in its Pro counterparts.

iPhone 12 was the third best-selling and was the most popular model globally in Q2 2021.

Apple was criticized for the continued reliance on Face ID as the sole biometric option to unlock the device, which is incompatible with face masks. iOS 14.5 allowed the use of a paired Apple Watch to unlock the phone while wearing a mask, while iOS 15.4 allows unlocking with a mask on, without an Apple Watch. All models can still use a passcode to log in.

The iPhone 12 mini has received more mixed reviews. Some praised the phone for being a new small phone, while others criticized the price and inferior battery life compared to the full-size 12 (although the battery life of the iPhone 12 mini is longer than that of the second-generation iPhone SE).

=== "OLED-gate" ===
Within two weeks after its public release, a thread was started at Apple Support Communities describing a problem with the iPhone 12 and iPhone 12 Pro OLED panel black pixels not shutting off completely in black scenes, resulting in what was described as "ugly glowing". A considerable number of users have since posted replies reporting the same problem. Photos and videos have been shared online demonstrating the issue. As of January 2021, Apple has not yet made an official statement.

=== EarPods and power adapter controversy ===
Apple no longer includes either EarPods or a power adapter in the boxes of all iPhone 12 and 12 Pro models, claiming that it is an environmental initiative and no longer including them would reduce e-waste and permit smaller iPhone boxes, allowing more devices to be transported simultaneously to decrease its carbon footprint. The boxes only include a USB-C to Lightning cable, incompatible with the existing USB-A power adapters that Apple previously supplied with its devices. Users can still use their existing USB-A power adapters and cables but must purchase a USB-C power adapter sold separately to enable fast charging.

The iPhone 12 was sold in France with EarPods as the law required that smartphones be bundled with “hands-free kits” or a “headset” in order to protect children aged 14 and younger from electromagnetic radiation.

In December 2020, a Brazilian consumer rights watchdog Procon-SP Foundation requested Apple to provide proof that not including chargers is beneficial to the environment. The watchdog argues that Apple removing the charger is harming consumers and wants to force the company to include one as it claims the charger is an essential component.

The Verge reported the reason power adapters and EarPods are no longer included could be to offset the increased cost of 5G components. These new components are reported to cost 30% more than their predecessors.

=== Repairability concerns ===
iFixit and Australian YouTuber Hugh Jeffreys discovered that a number of key components such as the cameras would malfunction or display warnings if they are replaced with new ones or those taken from an otherwise identical donor unit. Internal Apple documents also mention that, beginning with the iPhone 12 and in subsequent models, authorized technicians would have to run the phones through an internal System Configuration tool to reprogram repaired units in order to account for hardware changes. While Apple has yet to comment on the issue, the inability to replace key system components have raised concerns about right to repair and planned obsolescence. However, the iPhone 12 Mini does not have this issue. Apple later addressed the issue with the release of iOS 14.4, which displays a warning message if the phone detects an unpaired camera module but otherwise allows for full functionality.

=== Electromagnetic radiation concerns ===
In September 2023, the French watchdog agency Agence nationale des fréquences notified Apple that sales of the iPhone 12 must be halted in France due to the device exceeding the legal specific absorption rate for consumer electronics. The agency also requested that Apple must recall all iPhone 12s that have been produced in order to meet safety regulations. However, this coincided with the release of the iPhone 15 models where Apple also discontinued the iPhone 12 globally.

Despite this, France's digital minister emphasized that the iPhone 12's radiation levels remained well below the threshold deemed harmful by scientific studies. Apple insisted that the iPhone 12 complied with all applicable regulations. This highlighted a discrepancy between the agency's tests and real-world phone usage scenarios.

== See also ==
- History of the iPhone
- List of iPhone models
- Timeline of iPhone models

== Explanatory notes ==
| Preceded by iPhone 11 | iPhone; 14th generation alongside iPhone 12 Pro / 12 Pro Max | Succeeded by iPhone 13 / 13 Mini |
