= Siri AI =

Software-based personal assistant from Apple

- Siri AI prompt in iOS 27
- Developer: Apple
- Release: June 8, 2026; 5 months ago (beta); September 14, 2026; 59 days ago (public release)
- Operating system: iOS 27, macOS Golden Gate, watchOS 27, iPadOS 27, visionOS 27
- Platform: iPhone; iPad; Mac; Apple Watch; Apple Vision Pro; Some third-party devices
- Predecessor: Siri
- Available in: English
- Type: Intelligent personal assistant and Chatbot
- Website: apple.com/siri

Siri AI (/ˈsɪri/ SEER-ee) is a virtual assistant and chatbot developed by Apple included in devices that support Apple Intelligence and running iOS 27, iPadOS 27, watchOS 27, macOS 27, and visionOS 27.

== History ==
Siri AI was unveiled during Apple's Worldwide Developers Conference (WWDC) on June 8, 2026. Developed in partnership with Google Gemini, the updated system integrated on-screen awareness, contextual personalization, and multi-app task orchestration natively across the ecosystem. It was officially released by Apple following models with iOS 27, iPadOS 27, watchOS 27, macOS 27, visionOS 27 and Apple Intelligence support on September 14, 2026.

== Design ==
Siri uses voice control, gesture control, and a natural-language user interface to answer questions, make recommendations, and perform actions by delegating requests to a set of Internet services. With continued use, it adapts to users' language usages, searches, and preferences, returning personalized results.

Siri AI supports a wide range of user commands, including performing phone actions, checking information, scheduling events and reminders, changing device settings, searching the Internet, navigating areas, and being able to engage with iOS-integrated apps and third-party apps.

== Supported devices ==
Siri AI is processed in compatible devices using the third generation of the Apple Foundation Models SLMs and LLMs family, supported models either use the "Cloud" models for cloud processing or the "Advanced" models for on-device processing.

=== Basic model (Cloud) ===
Devices with an Apple M-series chip or an A17 Pro chip or later support the basic Siri AI model.

==== Macs ====
- MacBook Neo (A18 Pro)
- MacBook Air (M1, 2020) or later
- MacBook Pro (M1, 2020) or later
- Mac Mini (M1, 2020) or later
- Mac Pro (M2 Ultra, 2023)
- Mac Studio (M1 Max or M1 Ultra, 2022) or later
- iMac (M1, 2021) or later

==== iPads ====
- iPad Pro (M1, 5th generation, 2021) or later
- iPad Air (M1, 5th generation, 2022) or later
- iPad Mini (A17 Pro, 7th generation, 2024) or later

==== iPhones ====
- iPhone 15 Pro, 15 Pro Max, or later
- iPhone 16, 16 Plus, or later
- iPhone 16e or later
- iPhone Air
- iPhone Duo

==== Apple Watches (when paired with a supported iPhone) ====
- Apple Watch Ultra 2 or later
- Apple Watch Series 9 or later
- Apple Watch SE 3

==== Other devices ====
- Apple Vision Pro (M2) or later
- Apple TV 4K (4th generation; 2nd and 3rd generation when paired with a supported iPhone or iPad)
- HomePod Mini 2 (when paired with a supported iPhone or iPad)
- HomeView

=== Advanced model ===
iPhones with an A19 Pro chip or newer, iPads with an M4 chip or later and 12 GB of memory, Macs with an M3 chip or later and 12 GB of memory, and the Apple Vision Pro (M5) support the advanced Siri AI model, which includes more expressive voices, upgraded dictation and on-device processing.

==== iPhones ====
- iPhone 17 Pro, 17 Pro Max or later
- iPhone Air
- iPhone Duo

==== Macs ====
- MacBook Air (M3, 2024) or later, with at least 16 GB RAM
- MacBook Pro 14-inch (M3, November 2023) or later, with at least 16 GB RAM
- MacBook Pro 16-inch (M3 Pro or M3 Max, November 2023) or later
- Mac Mini (M4 or M4 Pro, 2024, or later)
- iMac (M3, 2023) or later, with at least 16 GB RAM
- Mac Studio (M4 Max or M3 Ultra, 2025, or later)

==== iPads ====
- iPad Pro (M4) or later, with at least 16 GB RAM
- iPad Air (M4)
- iPad Mini (A20 Pro)

==== Apple Vision Pro ====
- Apple Vision Pro (M5)

== Legal issues ==
=== European Union ===
Apple chose not to make Siri AI available to users in the European Union at launch of iOS 27, iPadOS 27, and watchOS 27. In July 2026, Apple explained the decision by stating that it is unable to satisfy the requirements of the Digital Markets Act (Note: It grants third-party AI assistants the same system-level access that Siri has) without compromising user privacy and security. EU regulators have disputed this characterization, stating Apple chose not to pursue a compliant solution.

=== China ===
Siri AI will not be released in mainland China due to other legal acts. Craig Federighi stated this at WWDC 2026, as well as on the Apple website:

Siri AI and the other new Apple Intelligence features will not be available in China while Apple works through regulatory requirements.
