= MacOS Golden Gate =

2026 operating system version

macOS Golden Gate
- Version of the macOS operating system

- Desktop screenshot of macOS Golden Gate
- Developer: Apple
- OS family: Mac; Unix-like, based on Darwin (BSD)
- Working state: Current
- Source model: Closed, with open-source components
- General availability: September 14, 2026; 57 days ago
- Latest release: 27.2.1 (November 9, 2026; 1 day ago) [±]
- Update method: Software Update
- Supported platforms: ARM64 (Apple silicon)
- Kernel type: Hybrid (XNU)
- License: Proprietary software with open-source components and content licensed with APSL
- Preceded by: macOS Tahoe
- Official website: apple.com/os/macos
- Tagline: More personal. More refined.

Support status
- Supported

Articles in the series

macOS Golden Gate (version 27) is the twenty-third major release of Apple's macOS operating system. The successor to macOS Tahoe, it was announced on June 8, 2026, at WWDC 2026, and it was released on September 14, 2026. It is the first version of macOS to run exclusively on Macs with Apple silicon and the last version with full Rosetta 2 functionality.

It is named after the Golden Gate, a strait between the Presidio of San Francisco and the Marin Headlands, which connects San Francisco Bay and the Pacific Ocean.

== Development ==
The development of the then-unnamed macOS 27 was confirmed by Apple at Worldwide Developers Conference (WWDC) 2025 during its Platforms State of the Union event when it outlined the conclusion of the Mac transition to Apple silicon. Apple stated that macOS 27 would drop support for Intel processors and be the last version with full Rosetta 2 functionality.

macOS Golden Gate was formally announced at WWDC on June 8, 2026. The first developer beta was released the same day. "GoldenGate" (without a space) was also previously used as the internal code name for macOS Big Sur.

== Features ==
Apple said that macOS 27 Golden Gate focuses on refining features introduced in the previous release based on user feedback. It has most features from iOS 27 and iPadOS 27, alongside these features:

=== System features ===
- Window border shapes are consistent across applications, reversing a change introduced in macOS Tahoe.
- The traffic light window control buttons have been redesigned to an Aqua-like Liquid Glass design similar to versions before OS X Yosemite.
- The mouseover cursor again uses the glove icon found in versions prior to Tahoe but using a different design.
- Pull-to-refresh is available in Safari, Mail, News, Podcasts, and Calendar.
- The iPhone Mirroring app supports window resizing.
- Notes and Freeform include additional Markup drawing tools.
- Screen recording now supports system audio.
- Many animations were changed, buttons now animate similar to iOS and iPadOS, top bars in apps now resemble the menu bars from iPadOS, the weather widget in the menu bar now has animation, and the Control Center now has a consistent closing animation.
- Apple Maps now behaves almost identically to the iPadOS version of the app, removing the top bar and changing the sidebar to a slide over one.
- The Dock now shows background processes in the context menus.
- Expanded touchscreen support due to releasing Mac computers with touchscreens.

=== Removed features ===
- Support for Apple Filing Protocol (AFP) has been removed. As a result, Time Machine backups to AirPort Time Capsule routers are no longer supported.
- AirPort Utility, used to manage AirPort routers, is no longer included with new installations. The app is still available for download on Apple's website, but Apple warns support for the app has ended and it is not guaranteed to work correctly.
- Boot Camp, used to install Windows on Intel-based Macs, has been removed because Golden Gate no longer supports Intel processors.

=== Other changes ===
- Golden Gate includes the same default wallpaper as iOS and iPadOS instead of using a different one like previous macOS versions. Beginning with macOS 27.0 beta 3, two real photos of the Golden Gate Bridge were added as wallpapers, being optional.
- Menu bar items no longer display icons by default, reversing a change introduced in macOS Tahoe.
- Beginning with macOS 27.0 beta 3, Spotlight was removed from the menu bar in favor of Siri for users that have joined the waitlist.

== Supported hardware ==
macOS Golden Gate runs on all Macs with an Apple Silicon (an M series chip or an A18 Pro chip), specifically:

- MacBook Air (M1, 2020 or later)
- MacBook Pro (M1, 2020 or later)
- Mac Mini (2020 or later)
- iMac (2021 or later)
- Mac Studio (2022 or later)
- Mac Pro (2023)
- MacBook Neo

Apple Intelligence features are supported on all Macs, but only those with an M3 chip or later with at least 12 GB of RAM support the advanced Siri AI model, which includes more expressive voices, upgraded dictation and on-device processing.

Golden Gate drops support for all Macs with an Intel CPU, including the Mac Pro (2019), the MacBook Pro (16-inch, 2019), the MacBook Pro (13-inch, 2020, four Thunderbolt 3 ports), and the iMac (2020), ending support for x86-64 processors. Intel-based applications will still be able to be used with Rosetta 2.

== Release history ==
The first developer beta of macOS Golden Gate was released on June 8, 2026. The Golden Gate developer betas are available to anyone with an Apple Developer account, without needing a developer subscription.

macOS Golden Gate releases
Version	Build	Release date	Darwin version
27.0	26A428	September 14, 2026	27.0.0 xnu-13432.1.9~1 Tue Aug 11 21:05:27 PDT 2026
27.0.1	26A434	September 28, 2026	27.0.0 xnu-13432.1.9~1 Tue Aug 11 21:05:27 PDT 2026
27.2	26B123	October 26, 2026	27.2.0 xnu-13432.41..4~25 Wed Oct 14 23:47:07 PDT 2026
27.2.1	26B131	November 9, 2026	27.2.0 xnu-13432.41..4~25 Wed Oct 14 23:47:07 PDT 2026
Legend: Unsupported Latest version Preview version

See Apple's official release notes.

Preceded by macOS Tahoe	macOS Golden Gate; 2026	Succeeded by -
