= Apple Home =

Software platform by Apple for home automation

- The Home app running on a Mac, iPad, iPhone, and Apple Watch
- Other names: Home
- Developer: Apple
- Platform: iPhone, iPad, Mac, Apple Watch, Apple TV, HomePod, HomeView, Apple Vision Pro
- Type: Home automation
- Website: apple.com/home-app

Apple Home is a smart home platform developed by Apple that lets users configure, communicate with and control smart appliances using Apple devices. Apple Home communicates with devices using the HomeKit software framework developed by Apple and the open Matter standard. By designing rooms, items and actions in Apple Home, users can enable home automations through a voice command to Siri or through Apple's Home app or third-party apps. With Apple Home, developers are able to create complex applications in order to manage accessories at a high level.

Apple Home primarily competes with smart home platforms such as Amazon Alexa and Google Home. As of 2024, Apple lists over 1,000 devices compatible with Apple Home, compared to 10,000 for Google and 85,000 for Amazon.

== Overview ==
=== HomeKit standard ===
Apple's HomeKit framework was introduced on iPhones and iPads on September 17, 2014, with iOS 8. The framework allowed third-party apps to interface with HomeKit devices using Siri and allow remote access through home hubs.

HomeKit was created to make tasks inside the home easier and provide users with methods and tools to change and adapt certain home capabilities to their specific desires. HomeKit manages connected home appliances through the HomeKit Accessory Protocol (HAP). Messages from HomeKit are continuously sent to powered devices, which incorporate fields which recognize the specific accessory and what category it is under. Each category has a code that is used to identify what the device is. It also identifies itself with the Global State Number (GSN). This number is increased each time that the state of the accessory is altered. Like most Apple devices, Apple Continuity Protocols are used. Continuity protocols consist of wireless technologies, such as Bluetooth and Wi-Fi. They can be conducted through device-to-device connection.

HomeKit uses Wi-Fi, Bluetooth and Thread protocols to communicate with devices. Manufacturers of HomeKit-enabled devices are required to enroll in the MFi Program. Apple also formerly provided documentation for creating non-commercial HomeKit accessories to any member of the Apple Developer Program. Initially, all HomeKit-based products were required to include an encryption co-processor. The latter requirement was later changed in iOS 11, which added support for software-based authentication. Equipment manufactured without HomeKit support can be enabled for use through a gateway product, such as a bridge that connects those devices to the HomeKit service.

=== Matter standard ===
On December 18, 2019, Apple announced it would be working closely with Samsung, Amazon, and Google to create an open standard for smart home automation called Matter. Matter aims to reduce fragmentation across different vendors, and achieve interoperability among smart home devices and Internet of things (IoT) platforms from different providers. The project was delayed to fall 2022 due to "unprecedented interest" by the Connectivity Standards Alliance (CSA). Version 1.0 of Matter was published on the October 4, 2022. Matter has been supported in Apple Home since iOS 16.1 and its forks.

== Home app ==
The Home app, which unifies all devices into one app, is included on the iPhone, iPad, Mac, Apple Watch, HomeView and Apple Vision Pro. It was introduced on iPhones and iPads on September 13, 2016, with iOS 10, and on Apple Watches with watchOS 3. The app also added support for automations using a fourth generation Apple TV, and preprogrammed scenes which can set multiple devices using a single command. Home toggles can also be added to the Control Center, allowing control over connected devices without having to use Siri or open the Home app. The Home app was introduced on Macs with macOS 10.14 Mojave, which was released on September 24, 2018.

With the release of iOS 16, iPadOS 16 and macOS Ventura in 2022, Home received a major redesign to make the app easier to navigate. With iOS 16.4, iPadOS 16.4, tvOS 16.4 and macOS Ventura 13.3 released on March 27, 2023, Home received the option to upgrade to a new architecture which was rebuilt from the ground up to be more efficient for users with multiple Apple Home devices. (Note: The architecture was originally released with iOS 16.2, iPadOS 16.2, tvOS 16.2 and macOS Ventura 13.1 on December 13, 2022, but Apple pulled the update nine days later after receiving reports of multiple issues.) Once a home is upgraded to the new architecture, it is no longer accessible by devices using older operating systems. iOS 18 brought guest access and in-app electricity usage integration. iOS 26, iPadOS 26, tvOS 26 and macOS Tahoe removed support for the previous Apple Home architecture. Functionality using older operating systems ended on February 10, 2026.

=== Apple TV & HomePod ===
The Apple TV (fourth generation and newer) can control Apple Home devices using Siri voice commands. tvOS 14, which was released on September 16, 2020, added direct control of devices in Control Center and camera feeds and picture-in-picture monitoring for HomeKit-enabled security cameras.

The HomePod supported Apple Home at launch in February 2018, as did the HomePod Mini in 2020. They lack a graphical user interface to control Apple Home devices and instead use Siri voice commands. Neither HomePods nor Apple TVs can unlock or open secure appliances like locks.

==== Home hubs ====
Since iOS 16, the Apple TV (4th generation or newer), HomePod, HomePod Mini and HomeView are fully supported as home hubs to control Apple Home appliances remotely, grant guest access, and set up automations. Thread networking is supported by the HomePod Mini, HomePod (second generation), HomeView and Apple TV 4K (second generation and later). (Note: Excluding the 64GB Apple TV 4K (third generation) without an Ethernet port.) Automations based on temperature and humidity are supported by the HomePod Mini (since software 16.3), HomePod (second generation), and HomeView. Prior to iOS 18, the Home app automatically selected the home hub if multiple were available.

iPads were supported as home hubs starting with iOS 10 but were phased out with iPadOS 16. iPads running iOS 10 to iPadOS 15 will not function as a home hub in homes upgraded to the new architecture introduced in iOS 16, nor will they work with Matter devices, but retained all functionality introduced before iPadOS 16. Support for the legacy Home architecture was discontinued in 2025 alongside the release of iPadOS 26.

The third-generation Apple TV only supported remote access in homes using the legacy architecture before it was discontinued in February 2026, and supported automations before iOS 10.

== Other standards ==
=== HomeKit Secure Routers ===
HomeKit Secure Routers were introduced in 2019 and allow users to limit network access for HomeKit devices, reducing potential vulnerabilities. Routers approved by the program restrict devices from accessing unauthorized services or data to minimize exposure to potential cyber threats. By 2024, Apple had reportedly stopped accepting new routers into the program.

=== HomeKit Secure Video ===
HomeKit Secure Video is an API introduced in 2019 that offers enhanced privacy and security for cameras and video doorbells. It allows video from supported cameras to be encrypted and stored securely in iCloud. The service requires a home hub to process videos. Users can also receive intelligent notifications based on specific activities, such as recognizing people, animals, vehicles and packages. Recordings from cameras are stored in iCloud for ten days for users with paid subscriptions.

=== Home Key ===
Home Key is a feature introduced in iOS 15 in 2021 that allows iPhones (XS or newer) and Apple Watches (Series 4 or newer) to unlock compatible NFC-equipped smart locks. Home keys are stored in the Wallet app and can be customized to use Express Mode which allows unlocking without requiring the user to authenticate with Touch ID or Face ID.

iOS 18 introduced support for hands-free home keys that use the ultra-wideband chip in iPhones (11 or newer, excluding SE and -e models) and Apple Watches (Series 6 or newer, excluding SE models) to automatically unlock a smart lock when a user approaches it.

=== HomeKit Adaptive Lighting ===
HomeKit Adaptive Lighting is a feature introduced in iOS 14 that automatically adjusts the color temperature of compatible color-adjustable smart lights throughout the day to match ambient natural light. Adaptive lighting requires a home hub.

Adaptive lighting for some lights using Matter was introduced with iOS 18.

== Device categories ==
"Works with Apple Home" badge

Apple Home currently supports the following device categories (an extended list):

- Air conditioners
- Air purifiers
- Bridges (Note: Supports HomeKit only)
- Cameras (Note: Supports HomeKit only)
- Doorbells (Note: Video doorbells support HomeKit only)
- Dehumidifiers/humidifiers
- Fans
- Faucets
- Garage door openers (Note: Supports HomeKit only)
- Lights
- Locks
- Outlets
- Programmable switches
- Audio/video receivers (Note: Supports HomeKit only)
- Range extenders
- Routers
- Robot vacuums (Note: Supports Matter only)
- Security systems
- Sensors
- Shower systems
- Smoke alarms
- Speakers (Note: Supports HomeKit only)
- Sprinklers (Note: Supports HomeKit only)
- Switches
- Thermostats
- Televisions (Note: Supports HomeKit only)
- Windows

Garage doors, locks, security systems, and windows are categorized as secure appliances, and require a device with authentication such as an iPhone or iPad to unlock.

== See also ==
- IFTTT
