= Josh Elman =

American investor and tech executive

- Education: Stanford University (BA)
- Occupations: Investor, tech executive
- Employer: Andreessen Horowitz

Josh Elman is an American investor and tech executive. He has held roles in engineering and product at Twitter, Facebook, LinkedIn, Robinhood, Apple, and others. In June 2026, he joined Andreessen Horowitz as a partner.

== Education ==
Elman received a bachelor's degree in symbolic systems, with an emphasis in human-computer interaction, from Stanford University in 1997.

== Career ==
Elman began his career as an engineer at RealPlayer in the early 2000s. He then worked in product and engineering at companies like Twitter, Facebook, LinkedIn, and Zazzle.

In 2011, Elman joined Greylock Partners as a principal. In 2013, he was promoted to general partner, with an eye for social networking platforms like Discord and Musical.ly.

In March 2018, Elman joined Robinhood as its vice president of product. At Greylock, he transitioned from general partner to venture partner, a role with reduced time but still Elman's board positions, existing investments, and even the possibility of new ones.

In November 2020, Elman left Robinhood and joined Apple to work on its App Store team. Although he wasn't leaving Greylock, he "was stepping back from active board roles at Medium, Discord, and Mammoth Media." As a director of product management, he also oversaw marketing for Apple Intelligence and Siri AI.

On June 23, 2026, Elman joined Andreessen Horowitz as a partner.
