= Apple A16 =

System-on-a-chip designed by Apple Inc.

Apple A16 Bionic
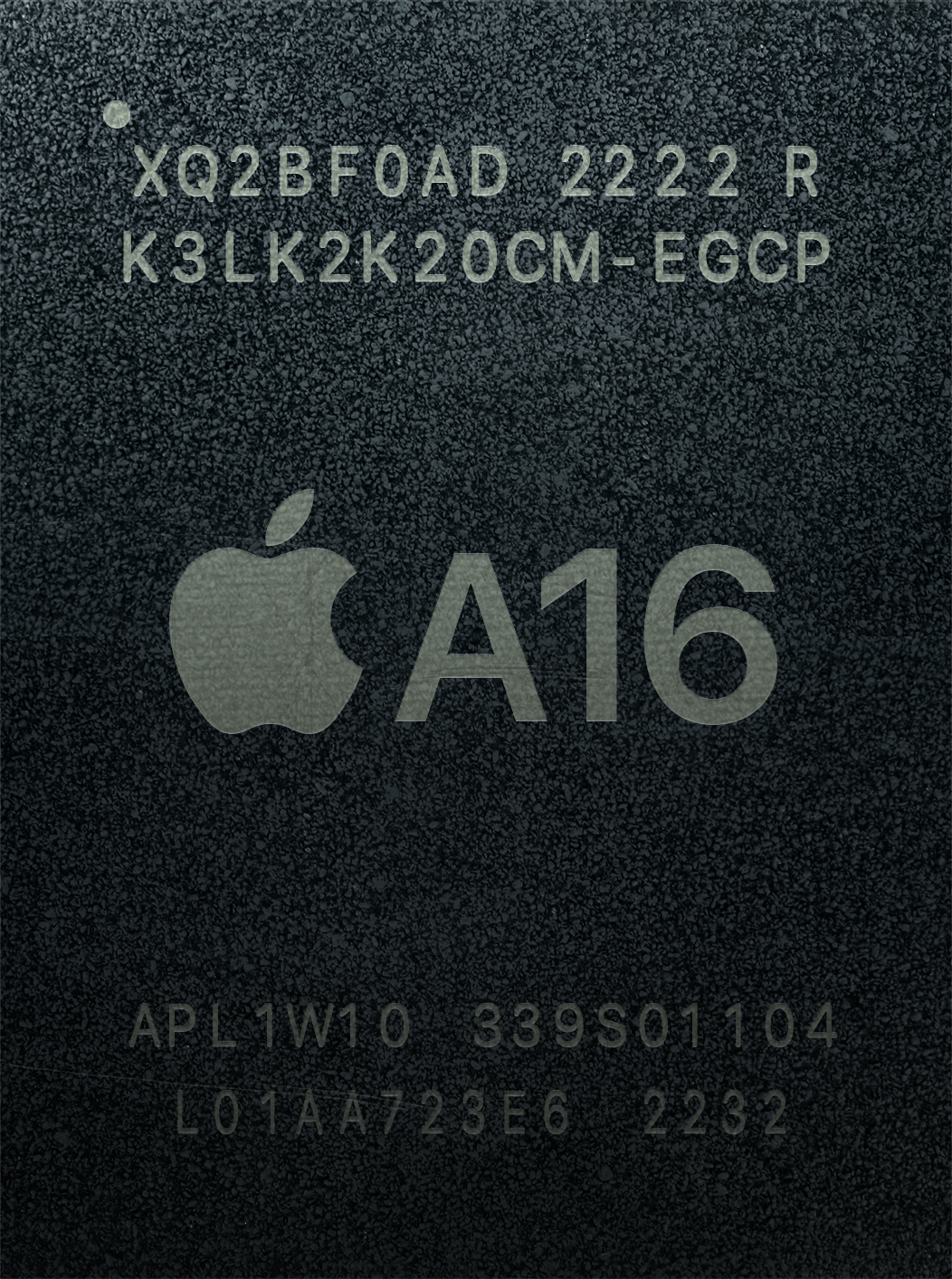

General information
- Launched: September 7, 2022
- Marketed by: Apple Inc.
- Designed by: Apple Inc.
- Common manufacturer: TSMC
- Product code: APL1W10

Performance
- Max. CPU clock rate: 2.02 GHz to 3.46 GHz

Physical specifications
- Transistors: 16 billion
- Cores: 6 cores: 2 performance; 4 efficiency
- Memory (RAM): 6 GB
- GPU: Apple-designed 4- or 5-core GPU @ 1398 MHz

Cache
- L1 cache: 320 KB per P-core (192 KB instruction + 128 KB data); 224 KB per E-core (128 KB instruction + 96 KB data)
- L2 cache: 16 MB (performance cores); 4 MB (efficiency cores)
- Last level cache: 24 MB

Architecture and classification
- Application: Mobile
- Technology node: 4 nm (TSMC N4P)
- Microarchitecture: Everest; Sawtooth
- Instructions: ARMv8.6-A

Products, models, variants
- Variant: Apple S9/S10 SiP (cut-down version that utilizes high efficiency cores from A16)

History
- Predecessor: Apple A15 Bionic
- Successors: Apple A17 Pro (iPhone 15 Pro, iPhone 15 Pro Max), Apple A18 (iPhone 16e, iPhone 16, iPhone 16 Plus)

The Apple A16 Bionic (known as just the A16 for the eleventh-generation iPad) is a 64-bit ARM-based system on a chip (SoC) designed by Apple Inc., part of the Apple silicon series, and manufactured by TSMC. It is used in the iPhone 14 Pro and 14 Pro Max, 15 and 15 Plus and iPad (A16).

== Design ==
The Apple A16 Bionic features an Apple-designed 64-bit six-core CPU implementing ARMv8.6-A with two "Everest" high-performance cores running at 3.46 GHz, and four "Sawtooth" energy-efficient cores running at 2.02 GHz, in a similar design to the A15 processor on iPhone 14. Apple claims the A16 is about 40% faster than the competition, and it also has new efficiency cores, with their big advantage being they use a third of the power of the best efficiency cores of other phones on the market.

The A16 contains 16 billion transistors, a 6.7% increase from the A15's transistor count of 15 billion. It includes an improved neural processing unit (NPU) with 16 cores known as the "Apple Neural Engine", a new image signal processor (ISP) with improved computational photography capabilities, and a new module for handling screen-related features that Apple calls a "Display Engine".

The A16 has hardware video encoding and decoding support for the HEVC, H.264, and ProRes codec.

During the iPhone 14 launch event Apple touted the A16 chip as the first 4 nm processor in a smartphone. However, a TechInsights analysis found that the A16 was manufactured by TSMC on their N4P process. "N4P", as it is called, is a de facto 5 nm fabrication process that offers enhancements in performance, power and density when compared to previous products in the same 5 nm family: N5, N5P and N4.

In September 2024, TSMC started producing A16 chips in the Arizona fab using the same N4P process as the main Taiwan plant.

== GPU and memory ==
The A16 integrates an Apple-designed five-core GPU, which is reportedly coupled with 50% more memory bandwidth when compared to the A15's GPU. One GPU core is disabled in the iPad (11th generation), resulting in a four-core GPU for this model.

The A16's memory has been upgraded to LPDDR5 for 50% higher bandwidth and a 7% faster 16-core Neural Engine, capable of 17 trillion operations per second (TOPS). In comparison, the Neural Engine on the A15 was capable of 15.8 TOPS. All variants of the SoC come with 6 GB of memory. Unlike previous generations of Apple's A-Series chips, the A16 utilises a vertical version of the A12X/M1 packaging instead of traditional PoP DRAM. This system is based on an epoxy glass substrate with DRAM mounted on one side, A16 SoC on the other side, and presumably via's going through the epoxy glass that connect the two. Due to the removal of PoP wires, the A16's energy consumption per DRAM read/write transaction has been slightly reduced.

== ISP and Display Engine ==
The new image processor (ISP) found on the A16 chip improved its computational photography capabilities. It was designed to handle the higher resolution image sensor found in the iPhone 14 Pro, being capable of performing up to 4 trillion operations per photo.

The Display Engine is a first on Apple A-series. It enables a better functioning "always-on display" feature, and handles other tasks such as the 1 Hz refresh rate, the higher peak brightness of the display and improved anti-aliasing techniques that help smooth out rough edges in the rendering of graphics and images on device displays.

== Firmware ==
New startup and shutdown chimes were added, only being available in accessibility.

== Products that include the Apple A16 Bionic ==
- iPhone 14 Pro & 14 Pro Max – 6-core CPU and 5-core GPU
- iPhone 15 & 15 Plus – 6-core CPU and 5-core GPU
- iPad (11th generation) – 5-core CPU and 4-core GPU

== See also ==
- Apple Silicon, range of ARM-based processors designed by Apple for their products
- Comparison of Armv8-A processors

| Preceded by Apple A15 Bionic | Apple A16 Bionic; 2022 | Succeeded by Apple A17 Pro |
