= MacBook Neo =

Laptop computer by Apple

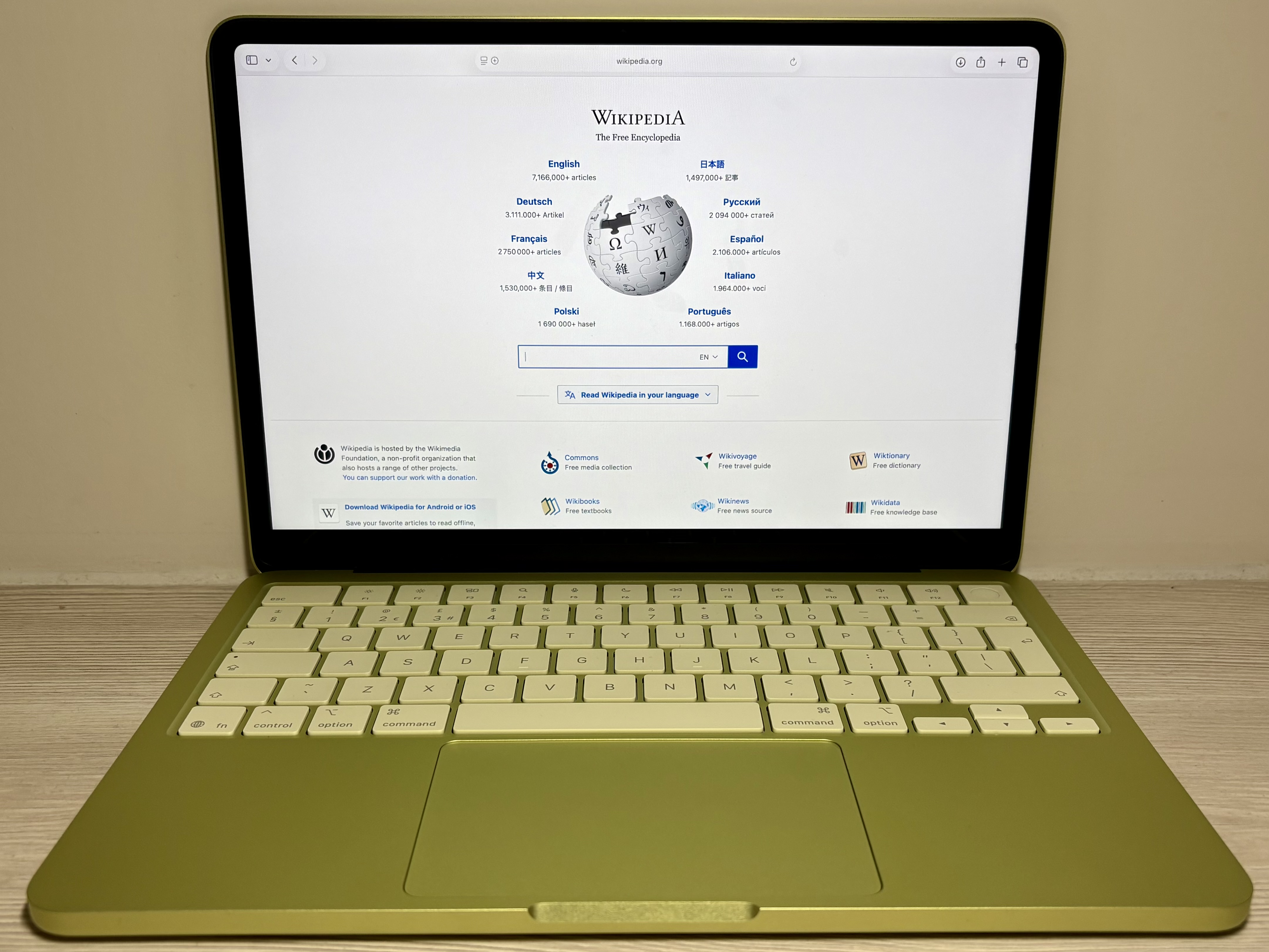
- MacBook Neo in Citrus finish
- Developer: Apple
- Product family: MacBook
- Type: Laptop
- Released: March 11, 2026; 8 months ago
- Operating system: Original: macOS Tahoe 26.3.2; Current: macOS Golden Gate 27.2.1, released November 9, 2026
- CPU: Apple A18 Pro
- Memory: 8 GB (LPDDR5X-7500)
- Storage: 256 or 512 GB SSD
- Display: 13-inch, 2408 × 1506 Liquid Retina IPS (219 ppi, 500 nits)
- Input: Magic keyboard, mechanical multi-touch touchpad
- Camera: 1080p FaceTime HD
- Connectivity: 1 × USB 10Gbps (USB‑C; supports DisplayPort); 1 × USB 2.0 (USB‑C); 1 × 3.5 mm audio jack; Wi-Fi 6E; Bluetooth 5.3
- Power: 36.5 Wh lithium‑ion battery
- Dimensions: 0.5 × 11.71 × 8.12 in (13 × 297 × 206 mm)
- Weight: 2.7 lb (1.22 kg)
- Predecessor: 12-inch MacBook
- Related: MacBook Air; MacBook Pro
- Website: apple.com/macbook-neo

The MacBook Neo is a laptop in the MacBook family developed by Apple. It is the first Mac to use an A-series chip previously used only in the iPhone and iPad, rather than the M-series used in other Apple silicon Macs. Announced on March 4, 2026, and released on March 11, 2026, it is positioned as the entry-level model in the MacBook lineup, below the MacBook Air and MacBook Pro. As of 2026, it is Apple's lowest-priced laptop.

== Overview ==
Apple introduced the MacBook Neo as part of its March 2026 product launches on March 4, 2026. The laptop was described by reports as an entry-level model aimed at mainstream users and students. According to an Apple marketing executive, the name "MacBook Neo" was chosen to feel fun, friendly, and fresh.

The MacBook Neo is the lowest priced laptop that Apple has ever sold. At launch, the MacBook Neo sold with a starting price of US$599, or US$499 for those who qualify for education pricing, such as students and school staff. Pre-orders began on March 4, 2026, with general availability beginning on March 11, 2026. The starting price was increased by US$100 on June 25, 2026, amid global memory shortages. The education discount was reduced by US$50 on October 28, 2026.

To lower production costs, Apple used binned A18 Pro chips retained from iPhone 16 Pro production. On these chips, one of the six GPU cores was defective and had been rejected during manufacturing. With that core disabled, the chips were configured as five-core GPUs for use in the MacBook Neo. Because Apple had already paid for the chips during iPhone 16 Pro production, they carried no additional procurement cost.

Initial MacBook Neo production consumed Apple's entire stockpile of approximately five million binned A18 Pro chips. Apple subsequently expanded production to around ten million units in total, requiring an additional A18 Pro fabrication run.

The Neo was designed with several other cost-reduction measures to achieve its lower price point. The computer is limited to 8 GB of memory, and uses a less advanced screen, while omitting several features found on higher-end MacBook models, including a backlit keyboard and a Force Touch trackpad, instead using a mechanical trackpad mechanism.

== Specifications ==
=== Design ===
The MacBook Neo features an aluminum body design like the MacBook Air models and a Liquid Retina display with black, uniform bezels. It is the first MacBook to have a notchless display since 2022.

Apple used an aluminum extrusion process for the MacBook Neo's enclosure, forming the material close to its final shape before machining. Higher-end MacBook models use aluminum blocks that are cut down to shape with CNC milling, a process that requires more machining time and removes more material, increasing cost.

The Neo is available in four colors: Silver, Blush, Citrus, and Indigo. The keyboard, trackpad, ports, and feet are color-matched to the chassis.

=== Hardware ===
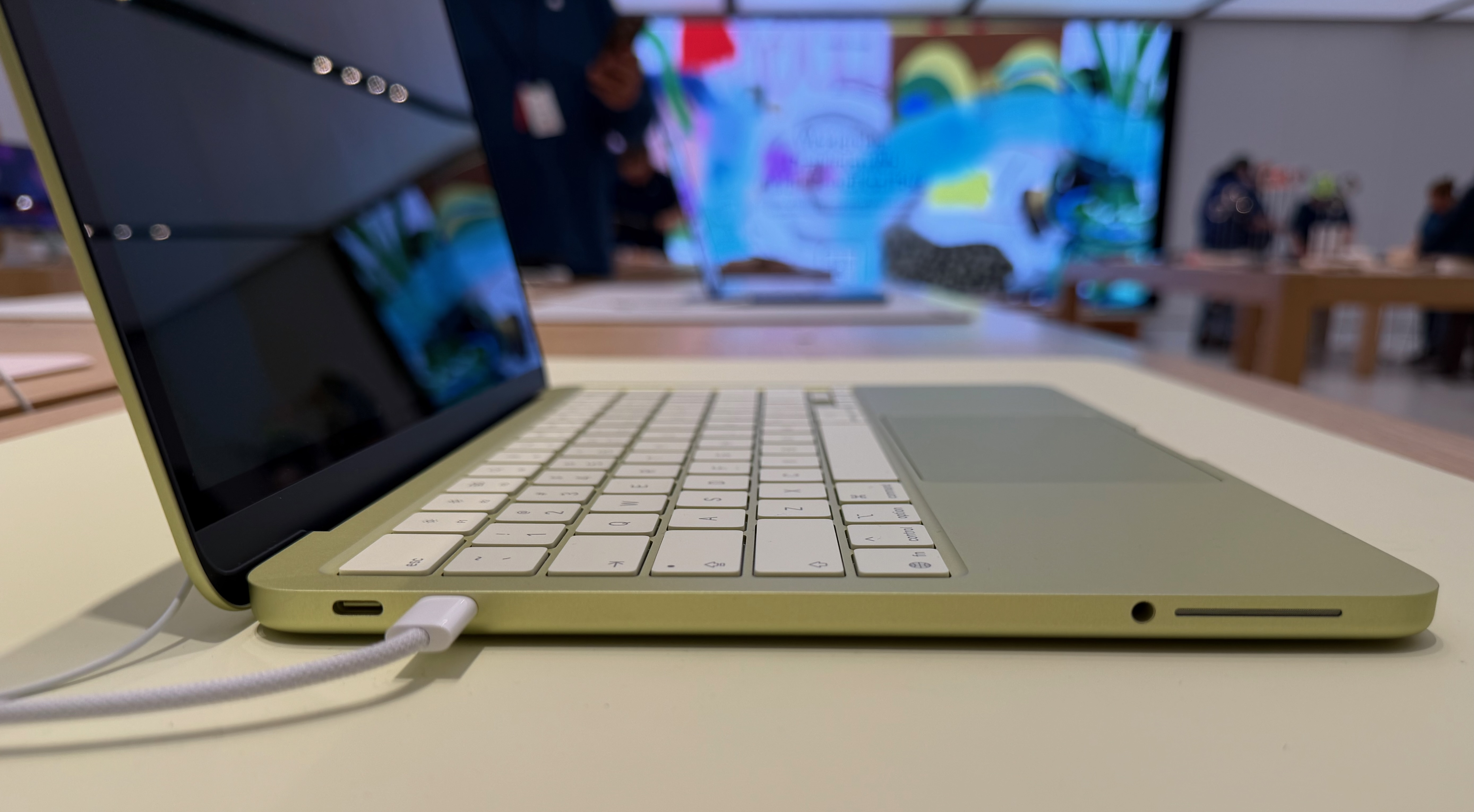
A view of the left-hand side of the device (from left to right): USB 10Gbps port, USB 2.0 port, 3.5 mm audio connector, and speaker. The right-hand side contains only a speaker.

The MacBook Neo has a 13-inch (330 mm) Liquid Retina display with a resolution of 2408 × 1506 pixels, a pixel density of 219 pixels per inch, 500 nits of brightness, and support for 1 billion colors. Compared with the entry-level MacBook Air, the display is slightly smaller, lacks True Tone, and uses the sRGB color space rather than Wide P3. Apple claimed the display offers higher brightness and resolution than competing laptops in its price tier. The MacBook Neo includes an anti-reflective coating to enhance visibility across different lighting environments. It includes a 1080p camera, while other current MacBook models use a 12-megapixel camera.

It includes two USB-C ports: one USB 10Gbps port with support for DisplayPort 1.4 and one USB 2.0 port. It also includes a 3.5 mm audio jack, Wi-Fi 6E, and Bluetooth 6. The MacBook Neo supports one external 4K display at 60 Hz. It has two microphones with directional beamforming and two side-firing speakers with support for Dolby Atmos, fewer microphones and speakers than found on higher-end MacBook models.

The computer uses the Apple A18 Pro, a system on a chip (SoC), previously introduced in the iPhone 16 Pro and 16 Pro Max. It has 8 GB of unified memory shared by a six-core CPU, consisting of two performance cores and four efficiency cores, and a five-core GPU. The MacBook Neo is the first Mac sold with an A-series chip rather than the more powerful M-series since the transition to Apple silicon. (Note: The first Mac known to use an A-series SoC was the Developer Transition Kit, which used the Apple A12Z Bionic and was loaned out to developers during the transition to Apple silicon.) The A18 Pro's low power consumption allows the MacBook Neo to use a passive, fanless cooling system.

The 256 GB base model lacks Touch ID and uses a standard lock button in place of the fingerprint sensor. Touch ID is included on the 512 GB model.

=== Performance ===
Early benchmark testing by Digital Trends recorded Geekbench 6 scores of 3,461 points in single-core performance and 8,668 points in multi-core performance, along with a Metal graphics score of 31,286 points. The same testing found higher single-core results than the M3 iPad Air.

Photographer and video editor Tyler Stalman tested the MacBook Neo during professional workflows and concluded that "Editing 4K video on this computer is totally fine, even with every other app running."

=== Repairability ===
A report by iFixit found that the MacBook Neo is Apple's most repairable laptop in 14 years, citing features including a screwed-down battery, lack of parts pairing, screwed-down keyboard, and modular ports and speakers.

iFixit attributed these design choices to Apple's targeting of institutional education customers, where IT departments need to replace frequently damaged components in deployed devices. The company noted that modular parts could simplify repairs in those environments.

=== Technical specifications ===
Model			MacBook Neo	
Basic info	Hardware string		Mac17,5	
Basic info	Model number		A3404	
Basic info	Part number		MHFA4, MHFH4, MHFD4, MHFF4	MHFC4, MHFJ4, MHFE4, MHFG4
Basic info	Date	Announced	March 4, 2026	
Basic info	Date	Released	March 11, 2026	
Basic info	Date	Discontinued	In production	
Basic info	Date	Unsupported	Supported	
Basic info	Operating system	Initial	macOS Tahoe 26.3.2	
Basic info	Operating system	Latest	macOS Golden Gate 27.2.1	
Basic info	MSRP		US$699 (Note: The MSRP was increased by $100 on June 25, 2026)	US$799
Colors				
Dimensions	Height		0.5 in (12.7 mm)	
Dimensions	Width		11.71 in (297.4 mm)	
Dimensions	Depth		8.12 in (206.2 mm)	
Dimensions	Weight		2.7 lb (1.22 kg)	
Secure authentication	Touch ID		No	Yes
Display	Size	Diagonal	13 in (330 mm)	
Display	Size	Vertical-by-horizontal	11.02 by 6.89 in (280 by 175 mm)	
Display	Resolution	Vertical-by-horizontal	2408 × 1506	
Display	Resolution	Density	219 ppi	
Display	Resolution	Aspect ratio	16:10	
Display	Resolution	Scaled resolution support	1637 × 1024 (Rendered as 3274 × 2048); 1408 × 881 (Rendered as 2816 × 1762, default); 1204 × 753 (Rendered as 2408 × 1506, native); 1024 × 640 (Rendered as 2048 × 1280)	
Display	Technology		Liquid Retina with IPS	
Display	Backlight		LED	
Display	Refresh rate		60 Hz	
Display	Max. brightness		500 nits	
Display	Contrast ratio (typical)		1,400:1	
Display	Color	Full sRGB	Yes	
Display	Color	Wide color (P3)	No	
Display	Color	Color depth	10-bit (FRC) with 1 billion colors	
Display	Color	True Tone	No	
Display	Color	Night shift	Yes	
Performance	Cooling system		Aluminum heat dissipator without fan	
Performance	Chip	Chip name	Apple A18 Pro	
Performance	Chip	Technology node	3 nm (N3E)	
Performance	Chip	Architecture	ARM64	
Performance	Chip	Total CPU cores	6	
Performance	Chip	High-performance cores	2 × 4.04 GHz	
Performance	Chip	Energy-efficiency cores	4 × 2.42 GHz	
Performance	Chip	Total GPU cores	5	
Performance	Chip	GPU family	Apple GPU Family 9	
Performance	Chip	Hardware-accelerated ray tracing	Yes	
Performance	Chip	Neural accelerators in GPU	No	
Performance	Chip	Metal support	Metal 4	
Performance	Chip	Neural Engine	16-core (35 TOPS INT8)	
Performance	Chip	Media Engine	Hardware-accelerated H.264, HEVC, ProRes and ProRes RAW; AV1 decode	
Performance	Chip	Apple Intelligence	Yes (except in mainland China and European Union)	
Performance	Unified memory	Memory type	LPDDR5X-7500 (3750 MHz)	
Performance	Unified memory	Bus width	64-bit	
Performance	Unified memory	Bandwidth	60 GB/s	
Performance	Unified memory	Size	8 GB	
Performance	Storage	Storage type	NAND flash using NVMe controller over PCIe connection	
Performance	Storage	Storage speed	1.7 GB/s	
Performance	Storage	Storage size	256 GB	512 GB
Connector	HDMI		No	
Connector	SD card slot		No	
Connector	USB-C		1 × USB 3 (USB-C) supporting DisplayPort; 1 × USB 2 (USB-C)	
Connector	Transmission speed		Up to 10 Gb/s (USB 3); Up to 480 Mb/s (USB 2)	
Connector	External display support		1 × 4K at 60 Hz	
Connectivity	Wi-Fi		Wi-Fi 6E (802.11ax)	
Connectivity	Bluetooth		Bluetooth 6	
Keyboard and trackpad	Number of keys		78 (U.S.) or 79 (ISO)	
Keyboard and trackpad	Arrow keys		Inverted-T arrangement	
Keyboard and trackpad	Function keys		Full-height	
Keyboard and trackpad	Backlit keyboard		No	
Keyboard and trackpad	Trackpad		Multi-Touch	
Camera	Resolution		1080p FaceTime HD	
Camera	Center Stage and Desk View		No	
Audio	Speakers		2	
Audio	Force-cancelling woofers		No	
Audio	Wide stereo sound		No	
Audio	Dolby Atmos playback		Yes	
Audio	Dolby Atmos with built-in speakers		Yes	
Audio	Spatial Audio with dynamic head tracking		No	
Audio	Microphone		Two, with directional beamforming Voice isolation and wide spectrum modes	
Audio	3.5 mm jack		Yes	
Power	Battery		36.5 W·h	
Power	Power adapter		20 W USB-C (Note: Not included in Europe)	
Power	Fast charge capability		Up to 35 W (Note: Maximum charging rate of 35 watts, but does not meet Apple's definition of fast charging.)	

== Reception and impact ==
The MacBook Neo received generally favorable reviews following its release. Reviewers praised its price, aluminum enclosure, display quality, battery life, and performance for everyday tasks, describing it as a strong entry-level Mac and a competitive option for students and first-time Mac users. Reviewers also noted that the laptop retained Apple's build quality despite its lower price.

Criticism focused on the compromises made to reach its price point. Reviewers cited the fixed 8 GB of memory, lack of a backlit keyboard, mechanical trackpad, limited port selection, and the absence of Thunderbolt support and a wide-color (P3) display. Several reviewers found the A18 Pro processor well suited to web browsing, office work, and media consumption, while noting that sustained professional workloads were better served by Macs with M-series processors.

After using the MacBook Neo for a month, CNET reported that the base model's 8 GB of memory became a limitation when multitasking or using memory-intensive applications, although it continued to perform well for lighter workloads.

Following the MacBook Neo's release, Microsoft commissioned a study comparing Windows laptops with the MacBook Neo as part of a marketing campaign promoting Copilot+ PCs. Macworld characterized the campaign as an indication that Microsoft viewed the MacBook Neo as a significant competitor.

In November 2026, the Philippine Department of Education procured 172,654 MacBook Neo units for teachers and administrative staff, which Apple described as its largest education deal for the Mac. The units were priced below the local retail price and included a five-year warranty, software, delivery, and teacher training under the department's computerization program.

== Timeline ==
Timeline of portable Macintoshes
See also: List of Mac models

== Notes ==
Preceded by 12-inch MacBook	MacBook Neo; March 11, 2026	Succeeded by Incumbent
