= HomePod Mini =

Smart speaker designed by Apple

HomePod mini

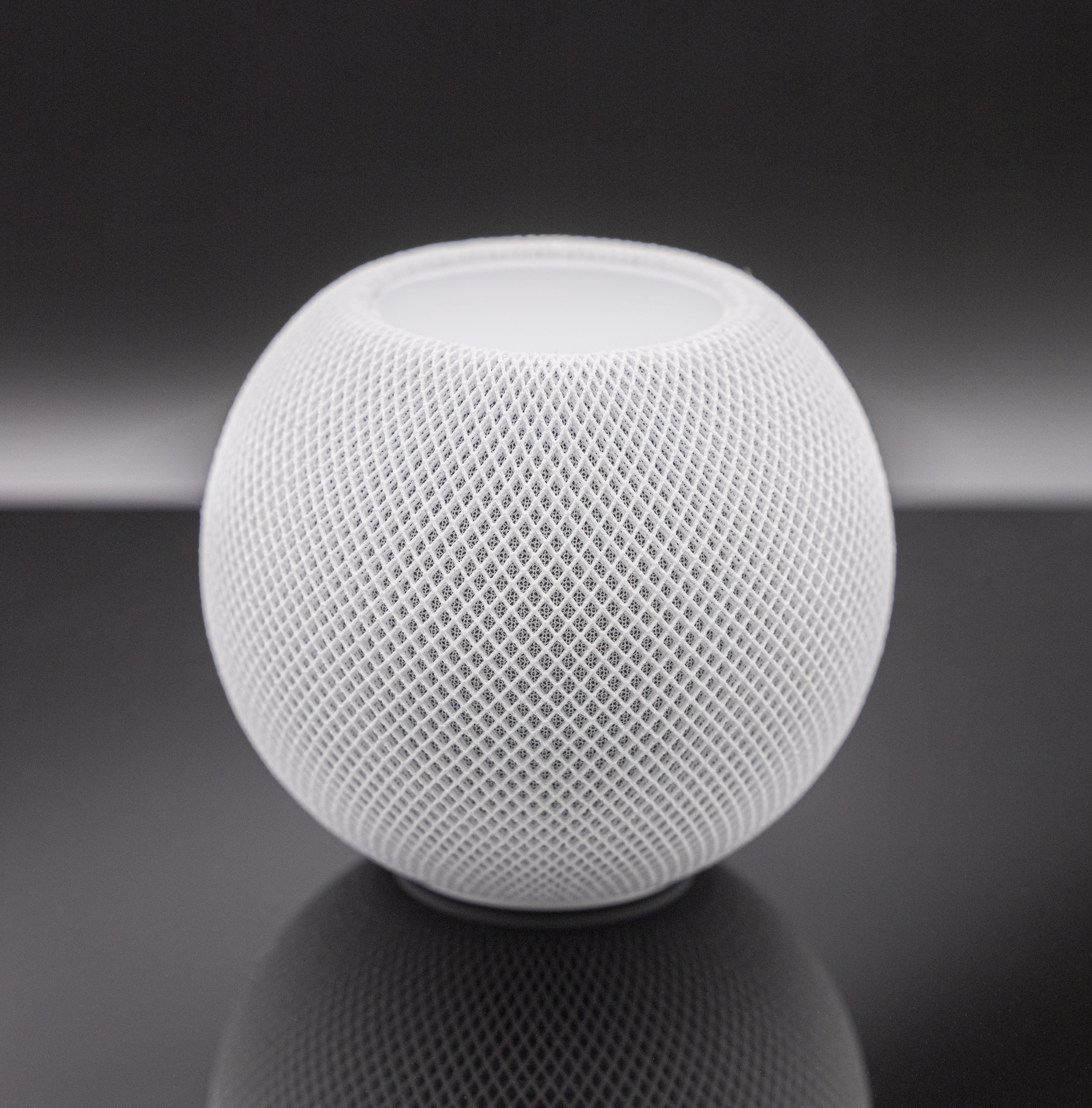
- Developer: Apple
- Product family: HomePod
- Type: Smart speaker
- Released: November 16, 2020; 5 years ago (1st); October 30, 2026; 0 days ago (2nd)
- Introductory price: US$99 (Note: Price increased to US$129 on June 25, 2026.) (1st); US$149 (2nd)
- Discontinued: October 13, 2026; 17 days ago (1st)
- Operating system: Original: audioOS 14.2 (18K60); Current: audioOS 27.0 (24J361)
- System on a chip: Apple S5 (1st); Apple S10 (2nd)
- Memory: 1 GB (LPDDR4X)
- Storage: 32 GB
- Display: LED matrix (19 RGB LEDs)
- Sound: 1 full-range speaker
- Input: Touch screen, voice commands via Siri
- Connectivity: Wi-Fi 4, Bluetooth 5.0, Thread, UWB (1st); Wi-Fi 6E, Bluetooth 6.0, Thread, UWB (2nd)
- Power: 18 W
- Dimensions: 3.3 × 3.9 in (84 × 99 mm)
- Weight: 0.76 lb (0.34 kg) (1st); 0.74 lb (0.34 kg) (2nd)
- Related: HomePod (second generation); HomeView
- Website: apple.com/homepod-mini

The HomePod Mini (stylized as HomePod mini) is a series of smart speakers developed by Apple. The HomePod Mini utilizes Apple's Siri digital assistant. The first model was released on November 16, 2020 as a smaller and less expensive version of the HomePod.

The HomePod Mini 2 was announced on October 13, 2026, which added improved internals and support for Siri AI functionality. It was released on October 30, 2026, replacing the first-generation model.

== Overview ==
=== First generation (2020) ===
The HomePod Mini is based on the Apple S5 system in a package also used for the Apple Watch Series 5 and SE. It improves Continuity and Handoff integration, enables Siri to recognize up to six people's voices and personalizing responses to each one, and adds the Intercom feature — also available on iPhones, iPads, and Apple Watches — enabling users with more than one HomePod to communicate with each other in different rooms. It requires an iPhone or iPad in order to run set up; it cannot be installed from a Mac.

The HomePod Mini has a single full-range speaker, which uses two passive radiators and a waveguide to shape the sound.

HomePod Mini's wireless capabilities include 802.11n Wi-Fi, Bluetooth 5, and an ultra-wideband chip for device proximity and AirPlay Handoff. It is compatible with devices running iOS 14 and iPadOS 14 and later. tvOS 15 allows the Apple TV to use HomePod Mini as a speaker, supporting a stereo pair.

HomePod Mini supports the Thread network protocol, supported by the Connected Home over IP working group. It can be used to control Apple Home devices and can function as a home hub, allowing it to control appliances remotely, grant guest access, and set up automations.

It has a non-detachable USB-C cable and comes with a 20W power adapter. With the release of audioOS 14.3 in late 2020, HomePod Mini gained support for 18W power adapters, which made it compatible with third-party adapters and portable power banks.

It is designed to operate at temperatures from 32° to 95 °F (0° to 35 °C); at relative humidity between 5% and 90% (noncondensing); and at altitudes up to 10,000 feet (3000 m). Following its launch, teardowns found a temperature and humidity sensor that was unannounced by Apple. Humidity and temperature sensing was activated following the 16.3 software update in January 2023, after these sensors were added to the second-generation full-sized HomePod.

On October 18, 2021, Apple announced that the existing gray and white options would be joined by blue, orange, and yellow versions. The new colors have a tinted touch display that is a lighter hue of the body color, and the braided cable is also colored accordingly. On July 15, 2024, Apple discontinued the space gray option and replaced it with a midnight color.

On June 25, 2026, the U.S. price of the HomePod Mini was increased to $129, due to component price increases caused by the global RAM and SSD shortage.

=== Second generation (2026) ===
The HomePod Mini 2 was announced on October 13, 2026, and started shipping on October 30, priced at $149. This represents a 15.5% increase from the previous $129 intermediate price point and a 50.5% increase over the original $99 launch price. It includes an S10 chip and adds support for Wi-Fi 6E and Bluetooth 6. A future software update will add Siri AI functionality when paired with a supported iPhone or iPad.

The HomePod Mini 2 can also be configured as a persistent default audio output speaker for Mac models with Wi-Fi 6E or later, as either a single unit or a matched stereo pair.

== Sales ==
Apple sold an estimated 4.6 million smart speakers in Q4 2020, representing sales of both the HomePod Mini and original HomePod. The HomePod Mini sold an estimated 2.18 million units in Q1 2021, representing 91% of Apple's smart speaker sales, along with the original HomePod. It sold an estimated 2.5 million units worldwide in Q2 2021, and 4 million units in Q3. It sold an estimated 4.5 million units in Q1 2022 and the HomePod Mini was the top selling individual smart speaker.

== Operating system ==
HomePod and HomePod Mini speakers run an operating system internally known as audioOS, a forked version of tvOS. This operating system was launched alongside the release of the original HomePod, released on February 9, 2018. Though it was initially a fork of iOS, since version 13.4 in 2020 it has been a fork of tvOS. Software updates are installed automatically over-the-air but can also be installed manually through the Home app. audioOS's main user-facing features are AirPlay 2 and Siri.

In 2021, an Apple job listing referenced a non-existent "homeOS" operating system, echoing previous Bloomberg leaks about possible future Apple products for the living room that would merge the Apple TV and HomePod, the job listing eventually replaced "homeOS" with "HomePod Software".

== Comparison with other models ==
Legend	Discontinued and unsupported	Discontinued and supported	Current	Upcoming

Models	HomePod (1st generation)	HomePod (2nd generation)	HomePod Mini	HomePod Mini 2
Release date	February 9, 2018	February 3, 2023	November 16, 2020	October 30, 2026
Discontinued	March 12, 2021	In production	October 13, 2026	In production
Initial OS	audioOS 11.0.2	audioOS 16.0	audioOS 14.1	audioOS 27.0
Latest OS	audioOS 27.2			
Hardware string(s)	AudioAccessory1,1; AudioAccessory1,2	AudioAccessory6,1	AudioAccessory5,1	AudioAccessory11,1
Model number(s)	A1639	A2825, A2878	A2374, A2531	A3374
System on a chip/package	Apple A8	Apple S7	Apple S5	Apple S10
Speakers	7 tweeters	5 tweeters	1 full-range driver, 2 passive radiators	
Speakers	4-inch (10 cm) woofer		1 full-range driver, 2 passive radiators	
Microphones	6	4		3
Connectivity	Wi-Fi 5	Wi-Fi 4		Wi-Fi 6E
Connectivity	Bluetooth 5			Bluetooth 6
Connectivity	—N/a	Thread		
Connectivity	—N/a	Ultra-wideband chip		
Sensors	Accelerometer		—N/a	
Sensors	—N/a	Humidity and temperature		
Sensors	Sound recognition			
Dimensions	6.8 in × 5.6 in (172 mm × 142 mm)	6.6 in × 5.6 in (168 mm × 142 mm)	3.3 in × 3.9 in (84.3 mm × 97.9 mm)	
Weight	5.5 lb (2.5 kg)	5.16 lb (2.3 kg)	0.76 lb (345 g)	0.74 lb (335 g)
Colors	Space Gray; White	Midnight; White	Space Gray (Note: Discontinued July 15, 2024); White; Blue (Note: Released November 1, 2021); Yellow; Orange; Midnight (Note: Released July 17, 2024)	White; Blue; Green; Pink; Midnight
Power	Built-in power supply, captive cable	Built-in power supply, detachable cable	External 20 W USB-C power adapter, captive cable	
Introductory price	US$349	US$299	US$99	US$149

== See also ==
- List of UWB-enabled devices
- Apple speakers
