= HomeView =

Smart speaker designed by Apple

- Apple HomeView in two models: wall-mounted model on the left and the countertop on the right
- Developer: Apple
- Manufacturer: Foxconn
- Type: Smart speaker
- Released: November 13, 2026; 9 days ago
- Introductory price: US$299
- Operating system: HomeView software
- System on a chip: Apple A18
- CPU: 2 performance cores, 4 efficiency cores
- Memory: 8 GB
- Display: 7 in (178 mm) 1088 × 1088-pixel resolution at 220 ppi
- Graphics: 5-core GPU
- Sound: Stereo speakers
- Input: Multi-touch screen
- Camera: 12 MP Center Stage camera
- Connectivity: Wi-Fi 6E (802.11ax); Bluetooth 6.0; Thread; Matter
- Power: Wired (30 W USB-C adapter included for countertop; Wall-mounted supports USB-C, AC, and PoE via separately purchased power mount)
- Online services: Apple Home, Siri AI / Apple Intelligence, iCloud, Apple Music, Apple Podcasts
- Dimensions: 5.38 to 6.82 in (13.7 to 17.3 cm) H × 5.73 in (14.55 cm) W × 3.78 to 5.13 in (9.6 to 13.0 cm) D; Wall-mounted: 5.73 in (14.55 cm) H × 5.73 in (14.55 cm) W × 0.39 in (0.99 cm) D
- Weight: 2.1 lb (953 g); Wall-mounted: 0.63 lb (286 g)
- Related: HomePod; HomePod Mini; Apple TV
- Website: www.apple.com/apple-homeview/

The HomeView is a smart speaker developed by Apple. Part of the Apple Home family, it was announced on October 13, 2026, alongside the Apple TV 4K (4th generation) and the HomePod Mini 2. It was released on November 13, 2026. It is Apple's first smart speaker to feature a graphical user interface. The device acts as a smart display, as well as a home hub to control Apple Home accessories. The HomeView's software features a limited selection of apps and voice control with Siri AI.

== Overview ==
The HomeView was announced on October 13, 2026, at an Apple event with the tagline "Welcome home" alongside the Apple TV 4K (4th generation) and the HomePod Mini 2. Additionally, it was revealed that the European Union would have a late launch due to restrictions on Siri AI.

The HomeView features a seven-inch display in an aluminum case. The countertop model has a base and stand that are similar to the iMac G4. The device has a single front-facing camera and is powered using USB-C without a battery. While the countertop version includes a 30 W USB-C power adapter, the wall-mounted version does not include the power adapter, which must be purchased separately. The wall-mounted option has mounting options for the device to be powered by USB-C, as well as by AC and PoE power, all of which are Schneider Electric branded. The countertop version is available in four standard color options—Silver, Space Gray, Starlight, and Rose Pink—while the wall-mounted version is available in Silver and Space Gray.

Model	Countertop version	Wall-mounted version
Base colors	Silver; Space Gray	
Base colors	Starlight; Rose Pink	—N/a

== Specifications ==
=== Design ===
The HomeView features a seven-inch touchscreen equipped with True Tone technology, supporting an automatic brightness range from 500 nits for sunlit environments down to 0.3 nits for low-light nightstand use. The interface automatically adjusts the amount of information displayed based on the user's proximity. It is built with an aluminum housing attached to a domed speaker base via a stainless steel hinge that allows for smooth angle adjustments, similar to the iMac G4.

=== Hardware ===
The HomeView uses the A18 chip with TSMC's 3 nm process.

The HomeView features built-in temperature and humidity sensors, alongside an ambient light sensor and accelerometer.

=== Operating system ===
The HomeView runs an operating system called HomeView software, a forked version of iOS, iPadOS and tvOS. The HomeView ships with HomeView software 26.5 at launch. The operating system does not have the App Store, but media from third-party apps can be streamed from an iPhone via CarPlay. It runs a launcher named BreadBoard and a Control Center process named CupBoard.

=== Technical specifications ===
The HomeView software full integration with personal context features requires a paired iPhone running iOS 27.2 or later, or an iPad running iPadOS 27.2 or later.

Model			Apple HomeView	Apple HomeView (wall-mounted)
Basic info	Model identifier		HomeAccessory17,1	HomeAccessory17,2
Basic info	Model number		A3218	A3300
Basic info	Date	Announced	October 13, 2026	
Basic info	Date	Released	November 13, 2026	
Basic info	Date	Discontinued	In production	
Basic info	Date	Unsupported	Supported	
Basic info	Operating system	Initial	HomeView Software 26.5	
Basic info	Operating system	Latest	HomeView Software 27.2.1	
Basic info	MSRP		US$299	
Basic info	Colors			
Dimensions	Height		5.38–6.82 in (13.67–17.32 cm)	5.73 in (14.55 cm)
Dimensions	Width		5.73 in (14.55 cm)	
Dimensions	Depth		3.78–5.13 in (9.60–13.03 cm)	0.39 in (0.99 cm)
Dimensions	Weight		2.1 lb (953 g)	0.63 lb (286 g)
Display	Size		7-inch (diagonal) Liquid Retina	
Display	Technology		LED backlit Multi-Touch with IPS	
Display	Resolution		1088 × 1088 at 220 ppi	
Display	Brightness		500 nits max.; 0.3 nits min.	
Display	Other features		True Tone, oleophobic coating	
System on a chip			Apple A18	
Camera			12 MP Center Stage, f/2.4 aperture	
Connector			USB-C port	
Wireless	Wi-Fi		Wi-Fi 6E (802.11ax) with MIMO; Simultaneous dual band	
Wireless	Bluetooth		Bluetooth 6.0	
Wireless	Other		Thread networking technology	
Sensors			Ambient light, temperature and humidity, accelerometer	
Speakers	Main		Two custom full-range drivers	
Speakers	Bass		Custom down-firing woofer Dual passive radiators	—N/a
Audio technology			Spatial Audio with Dolby Atmos; Four microphone design for far-field Siri; Sound Recognition	
Siri AI			Yes (basic model)	
Included power adapter			30 W USB-C	—N/a

== Reception ==
Several critics compared the wall-mounted HomeView to a "giant Apple Watch" or a "battery-less iPad". Marques Brownlee said he was "not convinced" and criticized the high price, lack of an App Store and limited facial recognition, believing the device is "a skip for most people".

== See also ==
- Amazon Echo
- Google Nest (smart speakers)
