= IPhone 16 Pro =

2024 smartphone by Apple

iPhone 16 Pro iPhone 16 Pro Max

- iPhone 16 Pro in Desert Titanium
- Developer: Apple
- Type: Smartphone
- Family: iPhone
- First released: September 20, 2024; 2 years ago
- Discontinued: September 9, 2025; 13 months ago
- Predecessor: iPhone 15 Pro and Pro Max
- Successor: iPhone 17 Pro and Pro Max
- Related: iPhone 16 and 16 Plus iPhone 16e
- Compatible networks: 2G GSM/EDGE, 3G UMTS/HSPA+, 4G LTE, 5G NR
- Form factor: Slate
- Colors: Desert Titanium; Natural Titanium; White Titanium; Black Titanium
- Dimensions: Pro: 149.6 × 71.5 × 8.25 mm (5.890 × 2.815 × 0.325 in); Pro Max: 163.0 × 77.6 × 8.25 mm (6.417 × 3.055 × 0.325 in)
- Weight: Pro: 199 g (7.0 oz); Pro Max: 227 g (8.0 oz)
- Operating system: Original: iOS 18; Current: iOS 27.2, released October 26, 2026
- System-on-chip: Apple A18 Pro
- CPU: 2x P-cores (4.02 GHz) + 4x E-cores (2.42 GHz)
- GPU: 6-core Apple GPU
- Modem: Qualcomm Snapdragon X71 5G
- Memory: 8 GB LPDDR5X
- Storage: 128 GB (Pro only); 256 GB; 512 GB; 1 TB; NVMe
- SIM: Dual eSIM (US); Dual nano-SIM (Hong Kong, Macau and mainland China); nano-SIM and eSIM (elsewhere)
- Battery: 16 Pro: 13.94 Wh (3582 mAh) Li-ion @ 3.89 V; 16 Pro Max: 18.17 Wh (4685 mAh) Li-ion @ 3.88 V
- Charging: MagSafe and Qi2 wireless charging; USB-C; (fast-charge capable: up to 50% charge in 30 minutes with 20W adaptor or higher); (Up to 50% charge in 20 minutes with 40W adaptor or higher)
- Rear camera: 48 MP, f/1.8, 24mm (wide); 12 MP, f/2.8, 120mm (periscope telephoto); 48 MP, f/2.2, 13mm (ultrawide); TOF 3D LiDAR scanner
- Front camera: 12 MP, f/2.1, 23mm (wide)
- Display: 16 Pro: 6.3 in (160 mm) 2622 × 1206 resolution at up to 120 hz; 16 Pro Max: 6.9 in (175 mm) 2868 × 1320 resolution at up to 120 hz
- Sound: Dolby Atmos-tuned Spatial Audio
- Connectivity: Wi-Fi 7 tri-band, Bluetooth 5.3 (A2DP, LE), Ultra-wideband, Thread, NFC (reader mode, Express Cards), LEO satellite (Globalstar, limited), USB-C: USB 10Gbps, Dual-frequency GPS (L1, L5), GLONASS, Galileo, QZSS, BeiDou, NavIC
- Water resistance: IP68 dust/water resistant (up to 6 m for 30 mins)
- Hearing aid compatibility: M3, T4
- Made in: China, India
- Other: Emergency SOS, Messages and Find My via satellite, FaceTime Audio or Video at 1080p over Wi-Fi and 5G, Voice over 5G Standalone (if supported by the carrier)
- Website: iPhone 16 Pro and iPhone 16 Pro Max at the Wayback Machine (archived September 9, 2024)

The iPhone 16 Pro and iPhone 16 Pro Max are smartphones developed and marketed by Apple. Alongside the iPhone 16 and iPhone 16 Plus, they form the eighteenth generation of the iPhone, succeeding the iPhone 15 Pro and iPhone 15 Pro Max, and were announced on September 9, 2024, and released on September 20, 2024. The iPhone 16 Pro and iPhone 16 Pro Max include a larger 6.3-inch and 6.9-inch display, a faster processor, upgraded wide and ultra-wide cameras, support for Wi-Fi 7, larger batteries, and come pre-installed with iOS 18. They were discontinued on September 9, 2025, following the announcement of the iPhone 17 Pro and 17 Pro Max.

== Specifications ==
=== Design and display ===
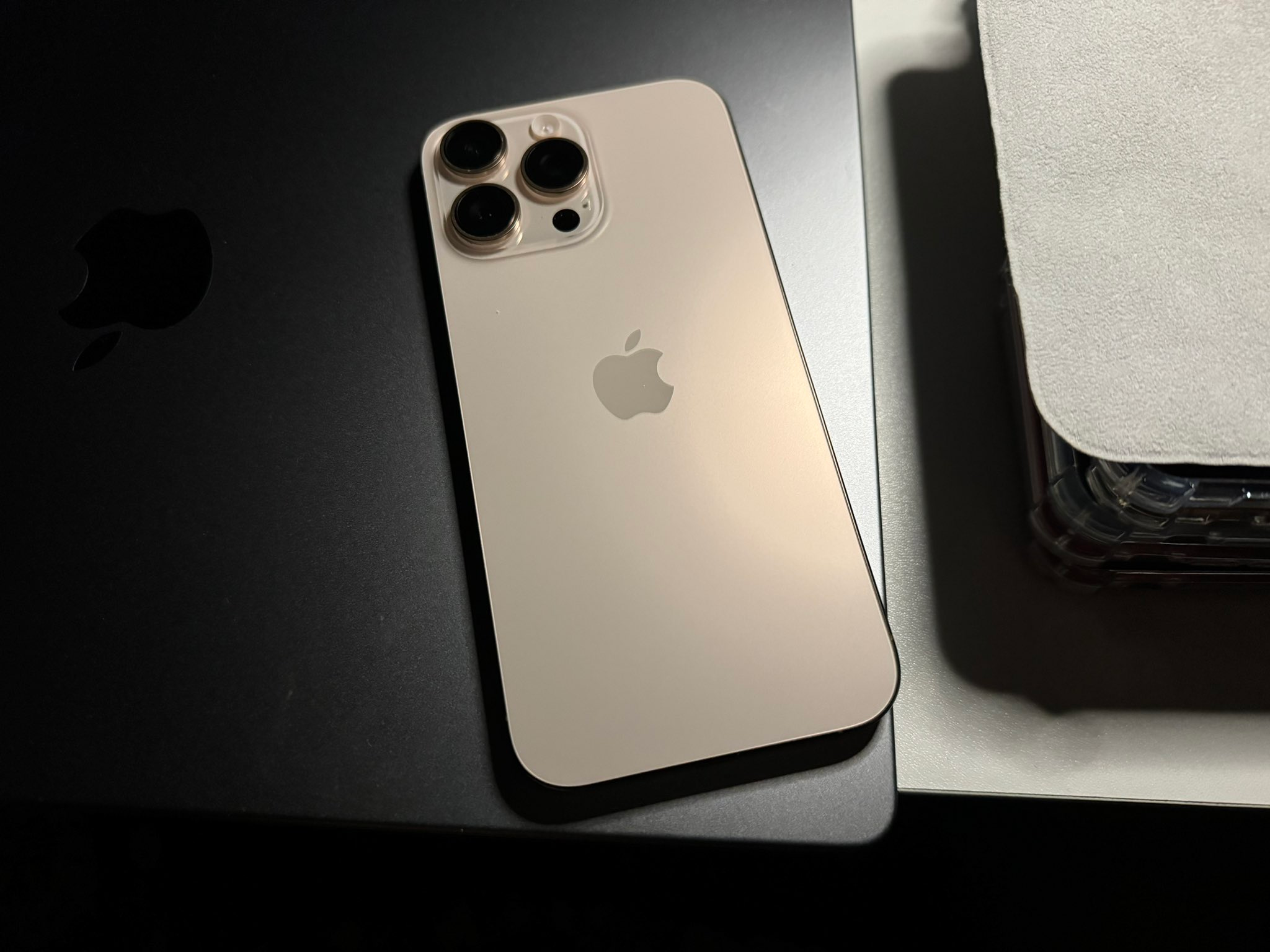
The rear of an iPhone 16 Pro Max in Desert Titanium

The iPhone 16 Pro models feature nearly identical designs to the iPhone 15 Pro models. The iPhone 16 Pro models continue the edge-to-edge design but introduce thinner display borders, giving them the thinnest borders of any Apple product to date. iPhone 16 Pro and iPhone 16 Pro Max feature larger 6.3-inch and 6.9-inch Super Retina XDR OLED displays, respectively. Both models feature always-on displays with a 13:6 aspect ratios, with 460 PPI density from a 2622 × 1206 (Pro) and 2868 × 1320 (Pro Max) resolution. Both include a dynamic refresh rate of up to 120 Hz, HDR10, with 1000 nits brightness typical and 2000 nits at peak.

Both iPhone 16 Pro models come in four colors: Desert Titanium, Natural Titanium, White Titanium and Black Titanium. The phones feature a lightweight, scratch-resistant exterior. The Desert Titanium color replaced the Blue Titanium color used on the iPhone 15 Pro and iPhone 15 Pro Max.

They are the final pro-level iPhones to come with the titanium form factor.

Color	Name
	Desert Titanium
	Natural Titanium
	White Titanium
	Black Titanium

=== Hardware ===
The iPhone 16 Pro models are powered by the Apple A18 Pro chip, built using the TSMC N3E process, significantly enhancing performance, especially in AI related tasks. The chip includes a 6-core CPU, 6-core GPU, and a 16-core neural processing unit (Neural Engine) with a speed of 35 trillion-operations-per-second (TOPS) that accelerates machine learning capabilities, allowing for seamless integration of Apple Intelligence features. Both models offer 8 GB of memory and storage options ranging from 128 GB (256 GB for Pro Max) to 1 TB.

All ‌iPhone 16‌ models have an improved thermal design. The main logic board has been updated, centralizing chip placement and optimizing the surrounding architecture. The ‌iPhone 16 Pro‌ line-up maximizes thermal capacity with a machined chassis that uses 100 percent recycled aluminum, bonded to the titanium frame using solid state diffusion. This is combined with a graphite clad aluminum substructure. Apple claims that the new thermal architecture enables a 20 percent improvement in sustained gaming performance compared to the A17 Pro.

Every model in the iPhone 16 line-up, except the 16e, has support for Wi-Fi 7 (802.11a/b/g/n/ac/ax/be). In a teardown by iFixit, the US model's modem was shown to be a Qualcomm Snapdragon X71 (SDX71M-000).

==== Camera ====
The iPhone 16 Pro introduces an upgraded camera system, with three rear cameras and a lidar scanner. It features "wide", "ultra-wide" and "telephoto" lenses. The wide camera is 48 megapixels, with sensor-shift optical image stabilization (OIS) and dual-pixel phase detection autofocus. The ultra-wide camera is 48 MP with a 120-degree field of view, optimized for low-light conditions. A 5× optical zoom telephoto camera, which was previously exclusive to the iPhone 15 Pro Max, now comes standard on both models. In addition, video recording now supports 4K at 120 frames per second (fps), offering the iPhone's "highest resolution and frame rate combination yet" and the first iPhone to record in 4K in slow motion.

===== Camera control button =====
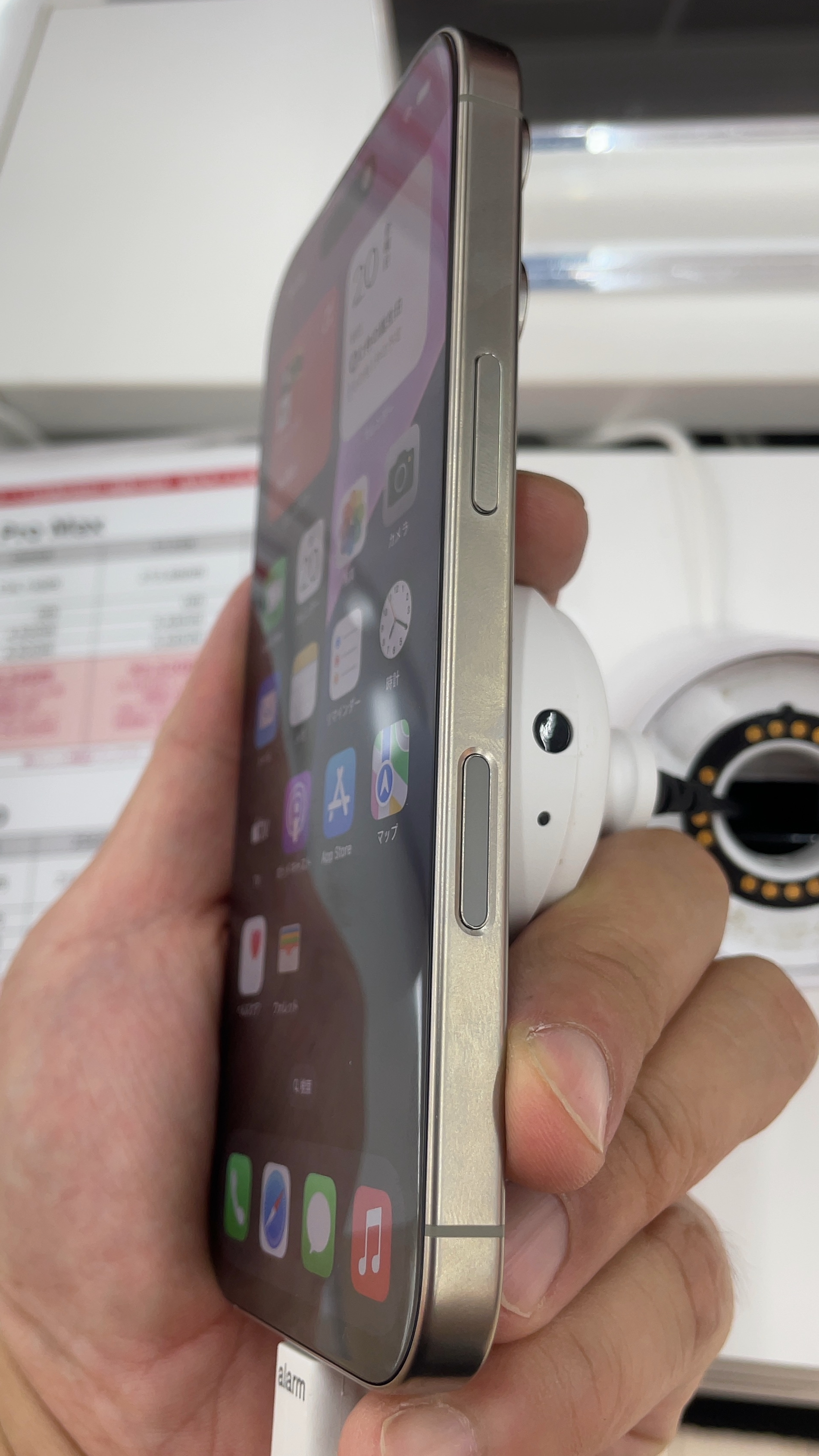
Right side of iPhone 16 Pro. Note the camera control button below the power button.

All iPhone 16 models, except for the iPhone 16e, come with a new button called Camera Control. This button is on the right side of the device, and allows the user to open the camera app, switch between different camera controls and features, and take photos and videos. The button can distinguish between light and hard presses. By pressing the button once, it opens the camera app. By lightly pressing it twice, it opens a small menu with different camera controls, such as zoom or tone, and if a user presses it hard once, it takes a photo. If a user holds it for a few seconds, it starts a video.

=== Software ===
One of the iPhone 16 Pro's features is its integration with Apple Intelligence, a suite of AI features.

It comes pre-installed with iOS 18. Prior to the launch of iOS 18.4, Apple added the ability to open Visual Intelligence by customizing the Action button or Lock Screen, or opening Control Center on the iPhone 16 Pro or iPhone 16 Pro Max, in addition to the ability to press and hold the Camera Control button to open the Visual Intelligence.

It also supports iOS 26, which was released in September 2025.

== Reception ==
The Guardian praised the iPhone 16 Pro for its battery life, performance, display, and camera quality, while criticizing its high price and that its design too much resembles that of its predecessor. The Pro Max version received similar praise and criticism, but was additionally criticized for its weight and "really big frame [which] is harder to hold and carry".

== Release and pricing ==
Pre-orders for iPhone 16 Pro and iPhone 16 Pro Max began on September 13, 2024, and they became available on September 20, 2024. The iPhone 16 Pro model starts at $999, while the Pro Max model starts at $1,199.

=== Availability by region ===
September 20, 2024

- Australia
- Austria
- Bahrain
- Brazil
- Belgium
- Bulgaria
- Canada
- China
- Croatia
- Czech Republic
- Denmark
- Finland
- France
- Germany
- Greece
- Hong Kong
- Hungary
- India
- Italy
- Ireland
- Japan
- Luxembourg
- Malaysia
- Mexico
- Netherlands
- New Zealand
- Norway
- Oman
- Poland
- Portugal
- Qatar
- Romania
- Saudi Arabia
- Serbia
- Singapore
- Slovakia
- South Africa
- South Korea
- Spain
- Sweden
- Switzerland
- Taiwan
- Thailand
- Turkey
- United Arab Emirates
- United Kingdom
- United States

September 27, 2024

- Macao
- Vietnam

October 18, 2024

- Bangladesh
- Israel
- Philippines

April 11, 2025

- Indonesia (sales ban lifted)

=== Indonesian sales ban ===
On October 20, 2024, the Indonesian Ministry of Industry announced a formal ban on the sale and use of iPhone 16 models in Indonesia, citing that Apple has not fulfilled their promised investments in the country, and failing to meet the 40% local content requirement threshold for certification. Apple subsequently offered a $100 million investment in exchange for lifting of the ban, but the Ministry of Industry rejected this offer, stating that it "has not met principles of fairness" and demanded a larger amount, which was later said to be at least $1 billion.

After further negotiations, which included the plan to build manufacturing, research and development facilities, the Ministry of Industry lifted the ban on February 26, 2025, with Apple subsequently entered the process of obtaining a local content certificate for selling the iPhone 16 models in Indonesia, starting from April 11.

Preceded by iPhone 15 Pro / 15 Pro Max	iPhone; 18th generation alongside iPhone 16 / 16 Plus and iPhone 16e	Succeeded by iPhone 17 Pro / 17 Pro Max
