= Apple A17 Pro =

System-on-a-chip designed by Apple Inc.

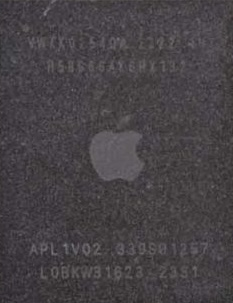

General information
- Launched: September 12, 2023
- Discontinued: October 26, 2026
- Designed by: Apple Inc.
- Common manufacturer: TSMC
- Product code: APL1V02
- Max. CPU clock rate: to 3.78 GHz

Physical specifications
- Transistors: 19 billion
- Cores: 6 cores (4 efficiency + 2 performance)
- Memory (RAM): 8 GB LPDDR5
- GPU: Apple-designed 5- or 6- core GPU

Cache
- L1 cache: 320 KB per P-core (192 KB instruction + 128 KB data); 224 KB per E-core (128 KB instruction + 96 KB data)
- L2 cache: 16 MB (performance cores); 4 MB (efficiency cores)
- Last level cache: 24 MB (system level cache)

Architecture and classification
- Application: Mobile (iPhone 15 Pro, iPad Mini (7th generation))
- Technology node: 3 nm (TSMC N3)
- Instruction set: ARMv8.6-A

History
- Predecessor: Apple A16 Bionic
- Successor: Apple A18

The Apple A17 Pro is a 64-bit ARM-based system on a chip (SoC) designed by Apple Inc., part of the Apple silicon series, and manufactured by TSMC. It is used in the iPhone 15 Pro, iPhone 15 Pro Max, and iPad Mini (7th generation) models and is the first widely available SoC to be built on a 3 nm process. This chip does not have a non-Pro variant, as Apple moved to the TSMC N3E manufacturing node technology and announced the A18 Series on September 9, 2024 through February 19, 2025, with the A18 and the A18 Pro respectively replacing the A15 Bionic (exclusively on the entry-level iPhone models with 5-core GPU), A16 Bionic (exclusively on the standard iPhone models with 5-core GPU) and the A17 Pro (exclusively on the premium iPhone models with 6-core GPU) on the new iPhone 16 lineup.

== Design ==
The Apple A17 Pro features an Apple-designed 64-bit ARMv8.6-A six-core CPU with two high-performance cores running at 3.78 GHz, and four energy-efficient cores running at 2.11 GHz. Apple claims the new high-performance cores are 10% faster due to its improved branch prediction, wider opcode decoder, and more powerful execution engines. The efficiency cores are claimed to be "3x more efficient" than the competition. The amount of RAM has increased to 8 GB, compared to 6 GB in the A16.

The A17 Pro integrates a new Apple-designed six-core GPU, which Apple claims is 20% faster than the A16 and their biggest redesign in the history of Apple GPUs, with added hardware accelerated ray tracing and mesh shading support. The 16-core Neural Engine is now capable of 35 trillion operations per second. The A17 Pro also added support for USB 3.2 Gen 2 (up to 10 Gb/s). The A17 Pro contains 19 billion transistors, a 19% increase from the A16's transistor count of 16 billion, and is fabricated by TSMC on their 3 nm N3 process.

The A17 Pro adds hardware decoding for AV1 video, and is the first Apple SoC with AV1 support.

=== Neural Processing Unit (NPU) ===
The A17 Pro's NPU delivers 35 TOPS (35 trillion operations per second), which has remained unchanged in the Apple A18. This is approximately 58 times more powerful than the NPU in the A11, which could handle 600 billion operations per second. The A11, introduced in 2017, was the first Apple chip to feature a Neural Engine.

Chip	Power (TOPS)	Year	Power relative to the A17 Pro
A11 Bionic	0.6	2017	1.71%
A12 Bionic	5.0	2018	14.29%
A13 Bionic	6.0	2019	17.14%
A14 Bionic	11.0	2020	31.43%
A15 Bionic	15.8	2021	45.14%
A16 Bionic	17.0	2022	48.57%
A17 Pro	35.0	2023	100.00%

== Products that include the Apple A17 Pro ==
- iPhone 15 Pro & 15 Pro Max – 6-core CPU and 6-core GPU
- iPad Mini (7th generation) – 6-core CPU and 5-core GPU

== Comparison of A15, A16 and A17 ==
Variant	CPU cores (P+E)	GPU			Neural Engine		Memory	Process	Transistor count	Used in
Variant	CPU cores (P+E)	Cores	EUs	ALUs	Cores	Performance	Memory	Process	Transistor count	Used in
A15 Bionic	5 (2+3)	5	80	640	16	15.8 TOPS	4 GB LPDDR4X	TSMC; N5P	15 billion	Apple TV 4K (3rd generation)
A15 Bionic	6 (2+4)	4	64	512	16	15.8 TOPS	4 GB LPDDR4X	TSMC; N5P	15 billion	iPhone 13
A15 Bionic	6 (2+4)	5	80	640	16	15.8 TOPS	4–6 GB LPDDR4X	TSMC; N5P	15 billion	iPhone 13 Pro, iPhone 14, iPad mini 6
A16 Bionic	6 (2+4)	5	80	640	16	17 TOPS	6 GB LPDDR5	TSMC; N4P	16 billion	iPhone 14 Pro, iPhone 15
A17 Pro	6 (2+4)	6	96	768	16	35 TOPS	8 GB LPDDR5	TSMC; N3	19 billion	iPhone 15 Pro
A17 Pro	6 (2+4)	5	80	640	16	35 TOPS	8 GB LPDDR5	TSMC; N3	19 billion	iPad Mini (A17 Pro)

== See also ==
- Apple silicon, range of ARM-based processors designed by Apple for their products
- Comparison of ARM processors#ARMv8-A

Preceded by Apple A16 Bionic	Apple A17 Pro; 2023	Succeeded by Apple A18 / A18 Pro
