= HomePod =

Smart speaker designed by Apple

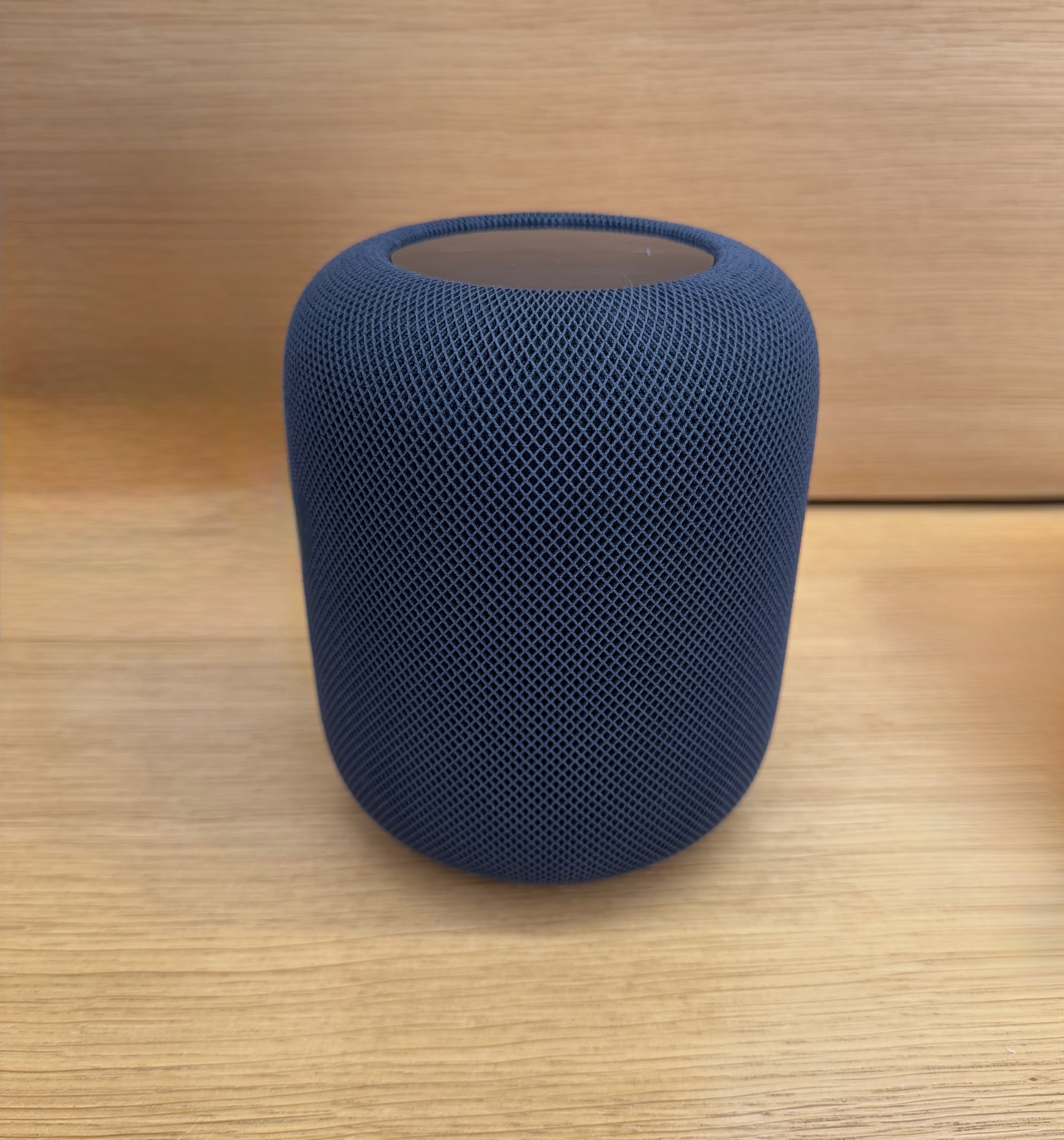
- A midnight HomePod (2nd generation)
- Developer: Apple
- Manufacturer: Inventec (under contract); Foxconn (under contract)
- Type: Smart speaker
- Released: February 9, 2018; 8 years ago (first generation); February 3, 2023; 3 years ago (second generation)
- Units sold: 1–3 million (2018)
- Operating system: audioOS, also known as "HomePod Software"
- Input: Multi-touch screen, voice commands via Siri
- Related: HomePod Mini; HomeView
- Website: apple.com/homepod

The HomePod is a series of smart speakers developed by Apple. Designed to work with the Apple Music subscription service, the HomePod incorporates beamforming and eight speakers and is sold in two colors: white and midnight. It is sold alongside the HomePod Mini, a smaller and less expensive variant introduced in 2020; and the HomeView, a smart display introduced in 2026.

The HomePod received mixed reviews: it was praised for its design and sound quality compared to other speakers of its price, and criticized for lack of third-party support and high price compared to other smart speakers.

== History ==
Reports about an Apple speaker with Siri had started in mid 2016, with early rumors suggesting that Apple is working on a device with a speaker and a microphone, and that it would be used with Siri. Throughout development, various placeholder names have been used, including "Siri Smart Speaker", and "Siri Speaker", with first signs of the new product began surfacing in September 2016.

In April 2017, Sonny Dickson reported that Apple would debut an Apple speaker with Siri at WWDC 2017, with Apple finalizing designs for the product. Early reports of production began to surface around the time of the WWDC 2017 event, with Bloomberg reported that the product would not launch until later in the year.

The rumored Apple speaker with Siri was announced on June 5, 2017, at the Apple Worldwide Developers Conference, being named as "HomePod". Its planned December launch was delayed: Apple began taking orders on January 26, 2018, and released it on February 9, 2018. The first-generation HomePod sold an estimated 1 to 3 million units through August 2018. It was discontinued on March 12, 2021.

The second-generation HomePod was announced on January 18, 2023, and released on February 3.

== First generation ==
The HomePod has a rounded, cylindrical shape, and has a small touchscreen on its top. It has seven tweeters in its base and a four-inch woofer (Apple does not specify Hz frequency range) towards the top, as well as six microphones used for voice control and acoustic optimization. The system-on-a-chip is the Apple A8, which Apple previously included in the Apple TV HD, iPod touch (6th generation), iPad Mini 4 and iPhone 6/6 Plus.

Siri can be used to control the speaker and other HomeKit devices, and can be used to conduct text messaging and voice calls from an iPhone. The HomePod mainly supports Apple's own platforms and technologies, including Apple Music, iTunes Store purchases and Match, iTunes podcasts, Beats 1 radio (now Apple Music 1), and AirPlay (with limited third-party support for internet radio services iHeartRadio, Radio.com, and TuneIn). A device running iOS 11 or later is required for initial setup. HomePod can serve as a sound bar within a home entertainment system when selected through an Apple TV. The HomePod does not officially support audio-in from Bluetooth sources.

AirPlay 2 and multi-room, multi-speaker support were announced in February 2018, and released in September 2018 in iOS 12 along with additional features such as multiple named timers, Find my iPhone, Siri shortcuts, the ability to make, receive and screen phone calls directly on the HomePod, and the ability to search for songs using the lyrics. HomePod initially did not allow multiple users to use the device, but multiuser support was added with the release of iOS 13.2.

The 13.4 software update, released in March 2020, changed the OS from an iOS code base to a tvOS-based system.

Greenhouse gas emissions for production, expected use and recycling for the HomePod are estimated at 146 kg CO_{2}e.

=== Reception ===
The HomePod received mixed reviews. The review from The Verge praised the HomePod's automatic acoustic calibration system, and felt that it sounded "noticeably richer and fuller" than competitors such as the Sonos One (described as sounding "a little empty") and Google Home Max (described as being a "bass-heavy mess"). The review from Ars Technica stated that the sound quality of the HomePod was "pretty good, rich and full for its size, better than the Sonos One but probably not $150 better, [and] a galaxy ahead of the Echo."

Its lack of support for third-party services and platforms was criticized, with Ars Technica arguing that it gave the device "intense inflexibility". Siri on the HomePod was also criticized for its limited functionality in comparison to assistants such as Alexa and Google Assistant; The Verge cited the inability to actually place phone calls from the speaker (they must be made on an iPhone and transferred to the HomePod), set multiple timers at once, or distinguish between multiple voices, and only supporting basic commands when using AirPlay, among other limitations. Multiple reminders can be used in lieu of multiple timers, albeit with less precision than a timer. All these issues have been fixed in iOS 12, released on September 17, 2018.

The Verge gave HomePod a 7.5 out of 10, writing that it "does more to make music sound better than any other speaker of this kind has ever done before", but that consumers should consider other options "unless you live entirely inside Apple's walled garden and prioritize sound quality over everything else." Wired shared similar criticisms over its lack of Siri functionality and support for third-party services, concluding that the HomePod would be of little interest to those who are not heavily invested in Apple's software and hardware ecosystem.

It was reported by some owners that the HomePod's silicone base stained oiled wooden surfaces with a white "ring" mark. Although Apple states that "it is not unusual for any speaker with a vibration-dampening silicone base to leave mild marks when placed on some wooden surfaces", and that the marks would eventually "improve" on its own, Stuart Miles (founder of the British technology blog Pocket-lint) reported that in his experience, the stain occurred after only about 20 minutes of use on a wooden surface, and that he had to sand and re-oil the surface to remove it. John Gruber criticized Apple for this abnormality, remarking that he had never seen an Apple product damage surfaces in such a manner before, and that it "seems like an issue that should have been caught during the period where HomePod was being widely tested at home by many Apple employees." Apple issued a support document suggesting to concerned users that they place the HomePod on a different surface.

=== Marketing and sales ===
To promote the HomePod, Apple released "Welcome Home", a four-minute film directed by Spike Jonze and starring FKA Twigs; commercial-length versions were also produced.

Strategy Analytics estimated that around 600,000 HomePods were sold in the first quarter of 2018, making it the 4th-best-selling smart speaker brand after Amazon, Google and Alibaba, giving Apple a 6% market share in the industry. The HomePod also had 6% market share in the United States according to a report from Consumer Intelligence Research Partners and sold an estimated 700,000 units worldwide in the second quarter of 2018. Also in the second quarter of 2018, Strategy Analytics estimated that the HomePod outsold all smart speakers that cost more than $200, giving Apple a 70% market share in premium brand smart speakers. As of mid-2018, the HomePod had sold an estimated 3 million units. Sales increased 45% in Q4 2018, with Apple selling 1.6 million units that quarter. In April 2019, Apple reduced the price to US$299; Gizmodo noted that permanent price cuts on current-generation Apple hardware are "beyond rare—they’re nearly unheard of." In March 2021, the price was reduced to £279 in the UK. As of May 2021, Apple was still reportedly selling units manufactured for the HomePod's launch stock.

=== Discontinuation ===
On March 12, 2021, Apple discontinued the HomePod, but kept the HomePod Mini. In a statement, Apple said "HomePod Mini has been a hit since its debut last fall, offering customers amazing sound, an intelligent assistant, and smart home control all for just $99. We are focusing our efforts on HomePod Mini. We are discontinuing the original HomePod, it will continue to be available while supplies last through the Apple Online Store, Apple Retail Stores, and Apple Authorized Resellers. Apple will provide HomePod customers with software updates and service and support through AppleCare." In July 2024, Apple classified the HomePod as "vintage," affecting its repair eligibility at Apple Stores and authorized service providers. Apple was criticized for violating its own policies for classifying products as vintage, which its website states were discontinued "more than 5 and less than 7 years ago"; at the time, the HomePod had been discontinued for three years and four months.

=== Reliability issues ===
Following its release, many users reported sudden shutdowns of the HomePod, often without any apparent cause. These failures are generally linked to a chip (diode) located on an internal circuit. Around the world, independent repair technicians have shown that replacing this component—costing only a few cents—can be enough to bring the device back to life, even though Apple officially refuses to offer out-of-warranty repairs for this model. While Apple has not justified the discontinuation of the original HomePod on technical grounds, several observers believe that the device’s recurring failures may have contributed to this decision.

== Second generation ==
On January 18, 2023, Apple announced the second-generation HomePod in a video announcement. It runs on an Apple S7 system-in-package, first used in the Apple Watch Series 7, and includes an Apple U1 chip for ultra-wideband support, which is used for haptic and visual feedback when handing off music from an iPhone to a HomePod. Compared to the first-generation model, it has two fewer tweeters and microphones, and only supports Wi-Fi 4 (802.11n) while the original supported Wi-Fi 5 (802.11ac). It also supports the Thread network protocol. An April 2023 software update added sound detection for smoke and carbon monoxide alarms. Externally, the second-generation model is similar to the first but slightly shorter at 6.6 inches (168 mm), and lighter at 5.16 lb (2.3 kg), and has a larger recessed touch screen panel at the top of the unit with the volume adjustment buttons permanently etched in. It can only create a stereo pair with another second-generation model.

According to YouTuber Marques Brownlee's testing, the second-generation HomePod can still leave white rings on wooden surfaces, though the issue is less pronounced than with the first-generation model.

The HomePod 27.2 software update added Sound Glow, where the top touch surface illuminates with colors matching active album artwork, alongside enhanced home theater capabilities supporting up to four matching speakers when paired with an Apple TV 4K (fourth generation). The HomePod can also function as the default output speaker with Mac computers with Wi-Fi 6E or later.

=== Touch surface issues ===
The second-generation HomePod also appears to face reliability issues, particularly with its touch surface. Some users report malfunctions leading to unintended activations or unresponsive controls, and in some cases even complete failures related to this area.

== Operating system ==
HomePod and HomePod Mini speakers run an operating system internally known as audioOS, a forked version of tvOS. This operating system was launched alongside the release of the original HomePod, released on February 9, 2018. Though it was initially a fork of iOS, since version 13.4 in 2020 it has been a fork of tvOS. Software updates are installed automatically over-the-air but can also be installed manually through the Home app. audioOS's main user-facing features are AirPlay 2 and Siri.

In 2021, an Apple job listing referenced a non-existent "homeOS" operating system, echoing previous Bloomberg leaks about possible future Apple products for the living room that would merge the Apple TV and HomePod, the job listing eventually replaced "homeOS" with "HomePod Software".

== Technical specifications ==
Legend	Discontinued and unsupported	Discontinued and supported	Current	Upcoming

Models	HomePod (1st generation)	HomePod (2nd generation)	HomePod Mini	HomePod Mini 2
Release date	February 9, 2018	February 3, 2023	November 16, 2020	October 30, 2026
Discontinued	March 12, 2021	In production	October 13, 2026	In production
Initial OS	audioOS 11.0.2	audioOS 16.0	audioOS 14.1	audioOS 27.0
Latest OS	audioOS 27.2			
Hardware string(s)	AudioAccessory1,1; AudioAccessory1,2	AudioAccessory6,1	AudioAccessory5,1	AudioAccessory11,1
Model number(s)	A1639	A2825, A2878	A2374, A2531	A3374
System on a chip/package	Apple A8	Apple S7	Apple S5	Apple S10
Speakers	7 tweeters	5 tweeters	1 full-range driver, 2 passive radiators	
Speakers	4-inch (10 cm) woofer		1 full-range driver, 2 passive radiators	
Microphones	6	4		3
Connectivity	Wi-Fi 5	Wi-Fi 4		Wi-Fi 6E
Connectivity	Bluetooth 5			Bluetooth 6
Connectivity	—N/a	Thread		
Connectivity	—N/a	Ultra-wideband chip		
Sensors	Accelerometer		—N/a	
Sensors	—N/a	Humidity and temperature		
Sensors	Sound recognition			
Dimensions	6.8 in × 5.6 in (172 mm × 142 mm)	6.6 in × 5.6 in (168 mm × 142 mm)	3.3 in × 3.9 in (84.3 mm × 97.9 mm)	
Weight	5.5 lb (2.5 kg)	5.16 lb (2.3 kg)	0.76 lb (345 g)	0.74 lb (335 g)
Colors	Space Gray; White	Midnight; White	Space Gray (Note: Discontinued July 15, 2024); White; Blue (Note: Released November 1, 2021); Yellow; Orange; Midnight (Note: Released July 17, 2024)	White; Blue; Green; Pink; Midnight
Power	Built-in power supply, captive cable	Built-in power supply, detachable cable	External 20 W USB-C power adapter, captive cable	
Introductory price	US$349	US$299	US$99	US$149

== See also ==
- Apple speakers
- HomePod Mini
- List of UWB-enabled devices
