= Apple A18 =

System-on-a-chip designed by Apple Inc.

Apple A18 series
General information
- Launched: September 9, 2024
- Designed by: Apple Inc.
- Common manufacturer: TSMC
- Product code: A18: Tupai; A18 Pro: Tahiti

Physical specifications
- Transistors: A18: 15.2 billion A18 Pro: 20 billion
- Cores: 2 p-cores @ 4.04 GHz + 4 e-cores @ 2.42 GHz
- Memory (RAM): 8 GB (LPDDR5X)
- GPUs: A18: 4-core: iPhone 16e; 5-core: iPhone 16, iPhone 16 Plus; A18 Pro: 5-core: MacBook Neo; 6-core: iPhone 16 Pro, iPhone 16 Pro Max
- Co-processor: NPU: 35 TOPS (16 cores)

Cache
- L2 cache: A18: 8 MB (p-cores); A18 Pro: 16 MB (p-cores), 4 MB (e-cores)
- L3 cache: A18: 12 MB; A18 Pro: 24 MB

Architecture and classification
- Application: A18: iPhone 16, iPhone 16 Plus, iPhone 16e, HomeView; A18 Pro: iPhone 16 Pro, iPhone 16 Pro Max, MacBook Neo
- Technology node: 3 nm (TSMC N3E)
- Instruction set: ARMv9.2-A

History
- Predecessors: Apple A16 Bionic; Apple A17 Pro
- Successor: Apple A19

The Apple A18 and Apple A18 Pro are a pair of 64-bit, ARM-based, systems on a chip (SoC) designed by Apple Inc., part of the Apple silicon series. They are used in the iPhone 16, iPhone 16 Pro, iPhone 16e, MacBook Neo, and HomeView, built on a second generation 3 nm process (N3E) by TSMC. Announced on September 9, 2024, they are the successors to the Apple A16 Bionic (on standard iPhone models with 5-core GPU) and the Apple A17 Pro (on premium iPhone models with 6-core GPU).

== Design ==
The Apple A18 and A18 Pro feature an Apple-designed 64-bit ARMv9.2-A six-core CPU with two high-performance cores at 4.04 GHz and four energy-efficient cores at 2.42 GHz, a four to six-core GPU, and a NPU with 16 cores. Both are produced on TSMC N3E (3 nm FinFET) and measure 90 mm^{2} and 105 mm^{2} respectively.

=== CPU ===
Apple claims the A18 chip is up to 30% faster in CPU performance compared to iPhone 15 with the A16 Bionic chip and 50% compared to the iPhone 14 with the A15 Bionic chip. Also, it can deliver the same CPU performance of the A16 Bionic chip while consuming 30% less power.

The A18 Pro is up to 15% faster in CPU performance than the A17 Pro chip and can deliver the same CPU performance of A17 Pro chip while consuming 20% less power. Apple claims that the A18 Pro chip has larger caches than the A18.

=== GPU ===
The A18 chip integrates a new Apple-designed four- or five-core GPU, now adding hardware-accelerated ray tracing and mesh shading support to the non-Pro lineup. Apple claims that the new A18 chip is up to 40% faster in GPU performance compared to iPhone 15 with the A16 Bionic chip and can deliver the same GPU performance of the A16 Bionic chip while consuming 35% less power.

The A18 Pro features an additional GPU core, bringing its total to six cores, and delivers 20% faster performance than the A17 Pro GPU. Apple claims that it offers two times faster hardware ray tracing, though it is unclear whether this is exclusive to the A18 Pro or available on the non-Pro variant as well.

=== Additional aspects ===
The A18 Pro distinguishes itself from the non-Pro variant with advanced media features, including improved display engines, faster USB controllers, and upgraded video and image signal processors. Apple claims that the new video encoder processes two times more data than the A17 Pro chip.

The A18 has a USB 2.0 controller capable of only 480 Mbit/s through the USB-C port. The A18 Pro has a USB 3.2 Gen 2 controller capable of 10 Gbit/s.

=== Neural Processing Unit (NPU) ===
Apple states that the A18's 16-core Neural Engine is capable of 35 trillion operations per second (35 TOPS) and delivers up to twice the machine learning performance of the Neural Engine in the A16 Bionic. The same Neural Engine was used in the Apple A17 Pro, although Apple states that the A18 Pro performs Apple Intelligence tasks up to 15% faster, attributing the improvement to other architectural enhancements, including increased memory bandwidth. The A18's Neural Engine rated throughput is approximately 58 times that of the A11 Bionic, Apple's first chip with a Neural Engine, which was capable of 600 billion operations per second.

Chip	Power (TOPS)	Year	Power relative to the A18
A11 Bionic	0.6	2017	1.71%
A12 Bionic	5.0	2018	14.29%
A13 Bionic	6.0	2019	17.14%
A14 Bionic	11.0	2020	31.43%
A15 Bionic	15.8	2021	45.14%
A16 Bionic	17.0	2022	48.57%
A17 Pro	35.0	2023	—N/a
A18	35.0	2024	—N/a

== Products that include the A18 series ==
=== A18 ===
- iPhone 16e - 4-core GPU
- iPhone 16 - 5-core GPU
- iPhone 16 Plus - 5-core GPU
- HomeView

=== A18 Pro ===
- MacBook Neo - 5-core GPU
- iPhone 16 Pro - 6-core GPU
- iPhone 16 Pro Max - 6-core GPU

== See also ==
- Apple Intelligence
- Apple M4 series
