= Connectivity Standards Alliance =

Group that maintains and publishes the Zigbee and Matter standard

- Formation: 2002; 24 years ago
- Type: 501(c)(6), trade association
- Tax ID no.: 38-3655436
- Headquarters: United States
- Website: csa-iot.org

The Connectivity Standards Alliance (CSA), formerly known as the Zigbee Alliance, is a group of companies that maintain and publish the Zigbee and Matter standards, along with several others.

== Membership ==
Over the years, the Alliance's membership has grown to over 600 companies, including the likes of Amazon, Apple, Comcast, Google, Yandex, Ikea, Heiman, and Samsung SmartThings.

=== Membership levels ===
The CSA has four levels of membership: associate, adopter, participant, and promoter.

Associate membership is free. However, it only allows the member to white-label certified products as well as use Alliance Certification trademarks for a per product and annual fee.

Adopter members are allowed access to completed CSA specifications and standards, like Zigbee. They also gain access to Alliance technology logos and trademarks for certified products

Participant members have voting rights in Alliance Working Group teams and play a role in Zigbee or Matter development alongside access to Alliance technical working groups, and have early access to specifications and standards for product development.

Promoter members enjoy all other member level benefits as well as help lead with final approval on all standards developed by the Alliance by holding a seat on the Alliance Board of Directors. They pay an unknown one-time initiation fee as well as an annual membership fee of $105,000. As of 2024 there are 33 promoter members of the CSA who facilitate the promotion and advertisement of CSA developed standards, primarily Matter.

The Alliance also has two regional member groups in China and Europe: The Connectivity Standards Alliance Member Group China (CMGC) is formed by members with a focus on promoting Alliance technologies in the China market. The Europe Interest Group (EIG) consisting of 98+ member companies and 216 individual members has a focus on the European market.

== Alliance ==
The name Zigbee is a registered trademark of this group, and is not a single technical standard. The organization publishes application profiles that allow multiple original equipment manufacturer (OEM) vendors to create interoperable products. The relationship between IEEE 802.15.4 and Zigbee is similar to that between IEEE 802.11 and the Wi-Fi Alliance.

The requirements for membership in the Alliance cause problems for free-software developers working with Zigbee because the annual fee conflicts with the GNU General Public Licence. The requirements for developers to join the CSA also conflict with most other free-software licenses. The CSA board of directors has been asked to make their license compatible with GPL, but refused. Bluetooth has GPL-licensed implementations. However, the main Matter SDK is licensed under Apache 2.0 alongside the TypeScript and Rust implementations.

On May 11, 2021, the Zigbee Alliance announced its rebranding to Connectivity Standards Alliance.
