= IPhone 16 =

2024 smartphone by Apple

iPhone 16 iPhone 16 Plus

- iPhone 16 in Ultramarine
- Developer: Apple
- Type: Smartphone
- Series: iPhone
- First released: September 20, 2024; 2 years ago
- Discontinued: 16: September 9, 2025; 14 months ago (256 GB and 512 GB); 16 Plus: September 9, 2026; 2 months ago
- Predecessor: iPhone 15 and 15 Plus
- Successor: iPhone 17
- Related: iPhone 16 Pro and 16 Pro Max iPhone 16e
- Compatible networks: 2G GSM/EDGE, 3G UMTS/HSPA+, 4G LTE, 5G NR
- Form factor: Slate
- Colors: Ultramarine; Teal; Pink; White; Black
- Dimensions: 16: 147.6 × 71.6 × 7.8 mm (5.81 × 2.82 × 0.31 in); 16 Plus: 160.9 × 77.8 × 7.8 mm (6.33 × 3.06 × 0.31 in)
- Weight: 16: 170 g (6.0 oz); 16 Plus: 199 g (7.0 oz)
- Operating system: Original: iOS 18; Current: iOS 27.2.1, released November 9, 2026
- System-on-chip: Apple A18
- Modem: Qualcomm Snapdragon X71 5G
- Memory: 8 GB LPDDR5X
- Storage: 128, 256 or 512 GB NVMe
- SIM: Dual eSIM (US); Dual nano-SIM (Hong Kong, Macau and mainland China); nano-SIM and eSIM (elsewhere)
- Battery: 16: 13.84 Wh (3561 mAh) Li-ion @ 3.89 V; 16 Plus: 18.11 Wh (4674 mAh) Li-ion @ 3.88 V
- Charging: MagSafe and Qi 2 wireless; USB-C fast-charge
- Rear camera: 48 MP, f/1.6, 26 mm (wide); 12 MP, f/2.2, 13 mm (ultrawide)
- Front camera: 12 MP, f/1.9, 23 mm (wide)
- Display: Super Retina XDR OLED: 16: 6.1 in (155 mm) 2556 × 1179 resolution (~460 ppi density); 16 Plus: 6.7 in (170 mm) 2796 × 1290 resolution (~460 ppi density)
- Sound: Dolby Atmos-tuned Spatial Audio
- Connectivity: Wi-Fi 7 (802.11a/b/g/n/ac/ax/be) tri-band Bluetooth 5.3 (A2DP, LE); Ultra-wideband (UWB); Thread; NFC (reader mode, Express Cards); USB-C: USB 2.0 480 Mbit/s; GPS, GLONASS, Galileo, QZSS, BeiDou
- Water resistance: IP68 dust/water resistant (up to 6 m for 30 min)
- Hearing aid compatibility: M3, T4
- Other: Emergency SOS, Messages and Find My via satellite, FaceTime Audio or Video at 1080p over Wi-Fi and 5G, Voice over 5G Standalone (if supported by the carrier)
- Website: apple.com/iphone-16

The iPhone 16 and iPhone 16 Plus are smartphones developed and marketed by Apple. They are the eighteenth-generation iPhones, succeeding the iPhone 15 and iPhone 15 Plus. The devices were announced alongside the higher-priced iPhone 16 Pro and 16 Pro Max during the Apple Event at Apple Park in Cupertino, California, on September 9, 2024, and released on September 20.

The iPhone 16 was partially discontinued on September 9, 2025, specifically the 256 GB and 512 GB variants, following the announcement of the iPhone 17. The iPhone 16 Plus was fully discontinued and quietly removed from Apple's website on September 9, 2026, following the announcement of the iPhone 18 Pro, iPhone 18 Pro Max, and the iPhone Duo. Apple continues to sell the 128 GB storage variant of the iPhone 16.

== History ==
The devices were unveiled during an event on September 9, 2024, the first time an iPhone release had been announced on a Monday since the iPhone 4 in 2010. It is also the first iPhone not to include Apple stickers in the box, as Apple removed them for environmental reasons. Stickers can be included if a customer asks for them at an Apple Store.

== Design ==
The iPhone 16 is equipped with an aluminum design and a color-infused glass back, with the exception of white and black models. Like the iPhone 15, the device features a flat frame with rounded contours. The iPhone 16 and iPhone 16 Plus have a vertical camera layout, similar to the iPhone 11 and iPhone 12, as opposed to the diagonal layout for iPhone 13, iPhone 14, and iPhone 15. The iPhone 16 and 16 Plus come in five colors: Ultramarine, Teal, Pink, White, and Black.

Color	Name
	Ultramarine
	Teal
	Pink
	White
	Black

== Hardware ==
The iPhone 16 and the iPhone 16 Plus use an Apple A18 system on a chip. The chip is optimized for running generative artificial intelligence and features a Neural Engine that is twice as fast as its predecessor.

The iPhone 16 includes an updated 48-megapixel Fusion camera, the same resolution as the iPhone 15, with 2 μm, quad pixel PDAF, sensor-shift OIS, 100% Focus Pixels, support for super-high-resolution photos (24MP and 48MP). It has a new ultrawide camera with a wider aperture, automatic focus and 1.4 μm, 100% Focus Pixels.

The iPhone 16 international model supports Nano-SIM and eSIM, while the US model is eSIM only and the China model does not have any eSIM support.

All ‌iPhone 16‌ models have an improved thermal design. The main logic board has been updated, centralizing chip placement and optimizing the surrounding architecture. Apple claims that the recycled aluminum substructure dissipates heat for up to 30 percent higher sustained performance for gaming.

Every model in the iPhone 16 lineup has support for Wi-Fi 7.

=== Display ===
The iPhone 16 and iPhone 16 Plus retain their screen sizes of 6.1 inches (150 mm) and 6.7 inches (170 mm), respectively. They use Super Retina XDR OLED display technology and feature a full-edge screen design with slim borders. The iPhone 16 has a resolution of 2556×1179 pixels, while the iPhone 16 Plus has a resolution of 2796×1290 pixels. Both run on a 60 Hz refresh rate and neither are flicker free due to the use of pulse-width modulation for brightness control.

=== Camera ===
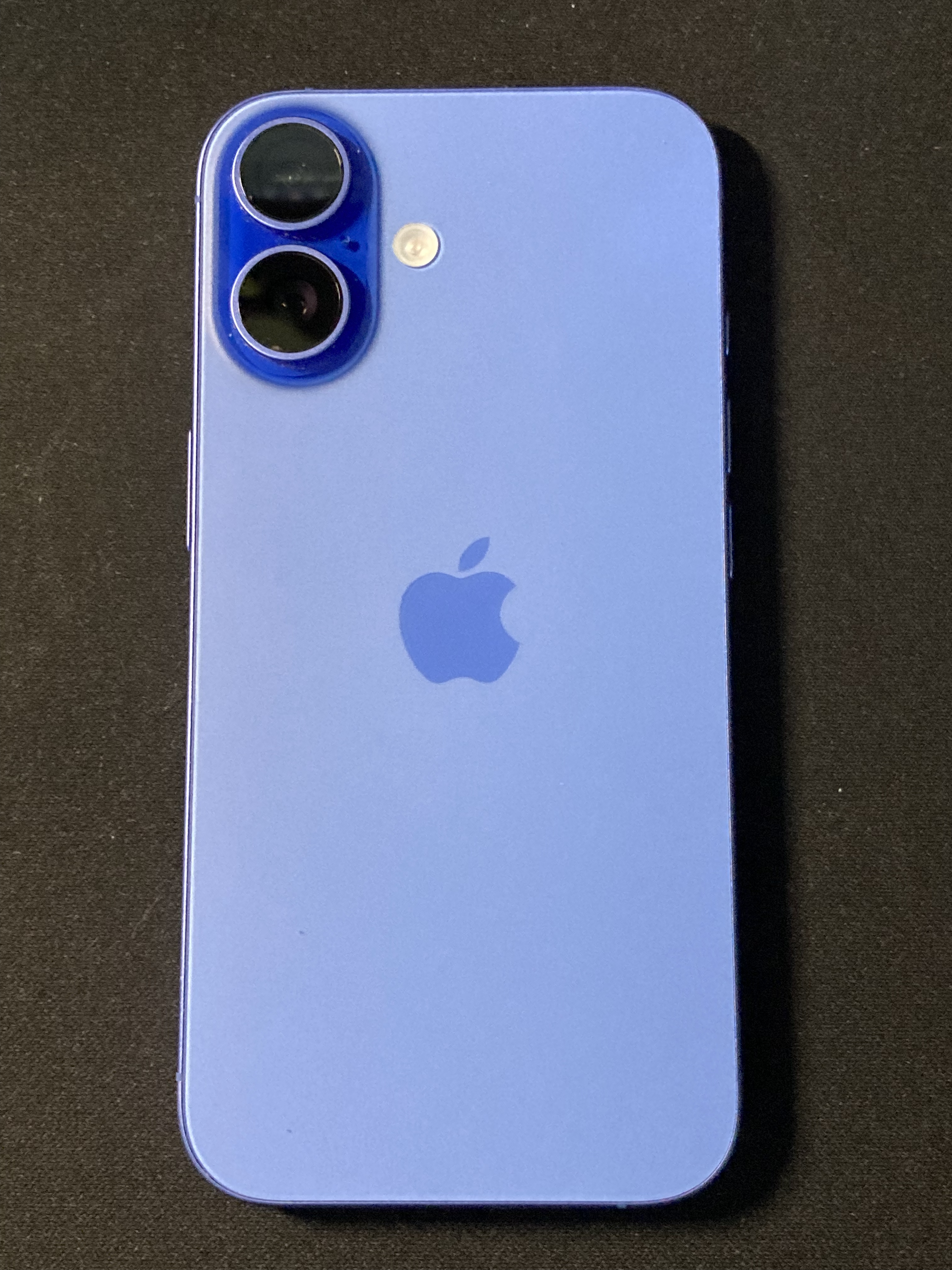
Back view of iPhone 16 in Ultramarine

iPhone 16 features a more refined dual-lens array on the back, with a 48 MP Fusion wide-angle lens and 12 MP ultrawide lens. The cameras are now aligned vertically for the first time since the iPhone 12, instead of diagonally like on the iPhone 15, enabling spatial video capture.

There is also improved Photographic Styles feature for real-time lighting and color adjustments, allowing specific tones and colors to be manipulated.

=== Action button ===
The iPhone 16 and iPhone 16 Plus come with the Action button, which was first featured on the iPhone 15 Pro lineup. By default, the Action button toggles silent mode. However, users can change the button's feature to do different functions other than silent mode, like open the camera app or toggle a focus mode.

=== Camera Control button ===
All iPhone 16 models now come with a new button called Camera Control. This button is on the right side of the device and allows the user to open the camera app, switch between different camera controls and features, and take photos and videos. The button can distinguish between light and hard presses. By pressing the button once, it opens the camera app. By lightly pressing it twice, it opens a small menu with different camera controls, such as zoom or tone. Pressing the button hard once takes a photo, while holding for a few seconds starts a video. The button can also be customized to open other apps that use the iPhone's cameras, such as Magnifier, Code Scanner, or third party camera apps.

=== Battery and charging ===
The iPhone 16 has been upgraded in terms of battery capacity.

The base iPhone 16 has a video playback duration of up to 22 hours, while the iPhone 16 Plus has a video playback of up to 27 hours. The iPhone 16 has a duration of audio playback of up to 80 hours, 20% less than the iPhone 16 Plus with 100 hours of audio playback. The MagSafe wireless charging standard has been refreshed with a longer cable as an option, allowing the iPhone 16 and iPhone 16 Plus to charge at a faster speed of 25 W with a 30 W power adapter.

== Software ==
The iPhone 16 launched with iOS 18. While the device was announced alongside Apple Intelligence, these features were delayed until after release.

iOS 18 includes recovery tools that allow users to recover and restore firmware wirelessly onto iPhone 16 series phones using another iPhone.

Prior to the launch of iOS 18.4, Apple added the ability to open Visual Intelligence by customizing the Action button or Lock Screen, or opening Control Center on the iPhone 16 or iPhone 16 Plus, in addition to the ability to press and hold the Camera Control button to open the Visual Intelligence.

All iPhone 16 models support iOS 26, which was released in September 2025.

== Release and pricing ==
The iPhone 16 has a starting price of US$799 (equivalent to $820.02 in 2025), while the iPhone 16 Plus starts at US$899 (equivalent to $922.65 in 2025). Pre-orders began on September 13, 2024, and sales started September 20. With the release of the successor, the iPhone 17, the price of the iPhone 16 models were reduced to US$699 and US$799, respectively.

On September 9, 2026, the iPhone 16 was raised back to its launch price of US$799, while the iPhone 16 Plus was discontinued on the same day.

=== Availability by region ===
September 20, 2024

- Australia
- Austria
- Bahrain
- Brazil
- Belgium
- Canada
- China
- Croatia
- Czech Republic
- Denmark
- Finland
- France
- Germany
- Greece
- Hong Kong
- Hungary
- India
- Italy
- Ireland
- Japan
- Luxembourg
- Malaysia
- Mexico
- Netherlands
- New Zealand
- Norway
- Oman
- Poland
- Portugal
- Qatar
- Romania
- Saudi Arabia
- Serbia
- Singapore
- Slovakia
- South Africa
- South Korea
- Spain
- Sweden
- Switzerland
- Taiwan
- Thailand
- Turkey
- United Arab Emirates
- United Kingdom
- United States

September 26, 2024

- Israel

September 27, 2024

- Macao
- Vietnam
- Malta

October 18, 2024

- Bangladesh
- Philippines

April 11, 2025

- Indonesia

=== Indonesian sales ban ===
On October 20, 2024, the Indonesian Ministry of Industry announced a formal ban on the sale and use of iPhone 16 models in Indonesia, citing that Apple has not fulfilled their promised investments in the country, and failing to meet the 40% local content requirement threshold for certification. Apple subsequently offered a $100 million investment in exchange for lifting of the ban, but the Ministry of Industry rejected this offer, stating that it "has not met principles of fairness" and demanded a larger amount, which later said to be at least $1 billion.

After further negotiations, which included the plan to build manufacturing, research and development facilities, the Ministry of Industry lifted the ban on February 26, 2025, with Apple subsequently entered the process of obtaining a local content certificate for selling the iPhone 16 models in Indonesia, starting from April 11.

== Reception ==
The iPhone 16 has received positive feedback for several aspects but also shows a few limitations. The upgraded design is a favorite, bringing a refreshed aesthetic with the available vibrant color options, which feel more dynamic than past models. The display maintains Apple's Super Retina HDR quality but is limited to a 60 Hz refresh rate, which some users find outdated compared to faster displays on cheaper competitor phones. The iPhone 16 Plus has been praised, weighing 30 grams less and having longer battery life than the iPhone 16 Pro Max, while having a similar screen size to the Pro Max. The "base model iPhone has often felt like a notable downgrade from its Pro counterparts, but that’s not the case this year", with the iPhone 16 and 16 Plus having enough features to make the 16 Pro and 16 Pro Max somewhat redundant. The phone's performance was well received by critics, with the A18 chip being around 30% faster in processing speed and 40% in graphics calculations compared to the A16 used in its predecessor.

Julian Chokkattu of Wired rated the iPhone 16 and 16 Plus 8 out of 10 points in his review, praising the phone's camera, performance, and battery life, but criticizing its 60 Hz display and slow USB 2 data speeds.

Preceded by iPhone 15 / 15 Plus	iPhone; 18th generation alongside iPhone 16 Pro / 16 Pro Max and iPhone 16e	Succeeded by iPhone 17
