= IPhone Air =

2025 smartphone by Apple

iPhone Air

- iPhone Air in Sky Blue
- Developer: Apple
- Type: Smartphone
- Series: iPhone
- First released: September 19, 2025; 13 months ago
- Related: iPhone 17 iPhone 17 Pro and 17 Pro Max iPhone 17e
- Compatible networks: 2G GSM/EDGE, 3G UMTS/HSPA+, 4G LTE, 5G NR/5G-A
- Form factor: Slate
- Colors: Sky Blue; Light Gold; Cloud White; Space Black
- Dimensions: 156.2 × 74.7 × 5.64 mm (6.15 × 2.94 × 0.22 in)
- Weight: 165 g (5.82 oz)
- Operating system: Original: iOS 26; Current: iOS 27.2.1, released November 9, 2026
- System-on-chip: Apple A19 Pro
- Modem: Apple C1X
- Memory: 12 GB LPDDR5X
- Storage: 256 GB, 512 GB or 1 TB NVMe
- SIM: Dual eSIM
- Battery: 12.263Wh (3149mAh) @ 3.894V
- Charging: MagSafe and Qi 2 wireless; USB-C fast-charge
- Rear camera: 48 MP, f/1.6, 26 mm (wide)
- Front camera: 18 MP, f/1.9 (wide)
- Display: 6.5 in (165 mm) OLED, 2736 × 1260 resolution at 460 ppi, 120 Hz refresh rate
- Sound: Mono speaker
- Connectivity: Wi-Fi 7 (802.11a/b/g/n/ac/ax/be) tri-band Bluetooth 6.0 (A2DP, LE); Ultra-wideband (UWB); Thread; NFC (reader mode, Express Cards); USB-C: USB 2.0 480 Mbit/s; Dual-frequency GPS (L1, L5), GLONASS, Galileo, QZSS, BeiDou, NavIC
- Water resistance: IP68 dust/water resistant (up to 6 m for 30 minutes)
- Made in: China, India
- Other: Emergency SOS, Messages and Find My via satellite, FaceTime Audio or Video at 1080p over Wi-Fi and 5G, Voice over 5G Standalone (if supported by the carrier)
- Website: apple.com/iphone-air

The iPhone Air is a smartphone developed and marketed by Apple. Part of the nineteenth generation of the iPhone, it was announced alongside the lower-priced iPhone 17 and the higher-priced iPhone 17 Pro and 17 Pro Max during the Apple Event at Apple Park in Cupertino, California, on September 9, 2025. With a depth of 5.6 mm (0.22 in), it was the thinnest iPhone ever at the time of its release, surpassing the 6.9 mm (0.27 in) thick iPhone 6; this excludes the top of the phone with a depth of 11.3 mm (0.44 in).

== Overview ==
The iPhone Air was announced alongside the lower-priced iPhone 17 and the higher-priced iPhone 17 Pro and 17 Pro Max during the Apple Event at Apple Park in Cupertino, California, on September 9, 2025. The iPhone Air replaces the Plus series in the iPhone line-up and is an option focused on lightweight design and enhanced features. To make the device thin, the iPhone Air had a depth of 5.6 mm (0.22 in), was eSIM only, and it had a smaller battery than previous iPhone models.

== Design ==
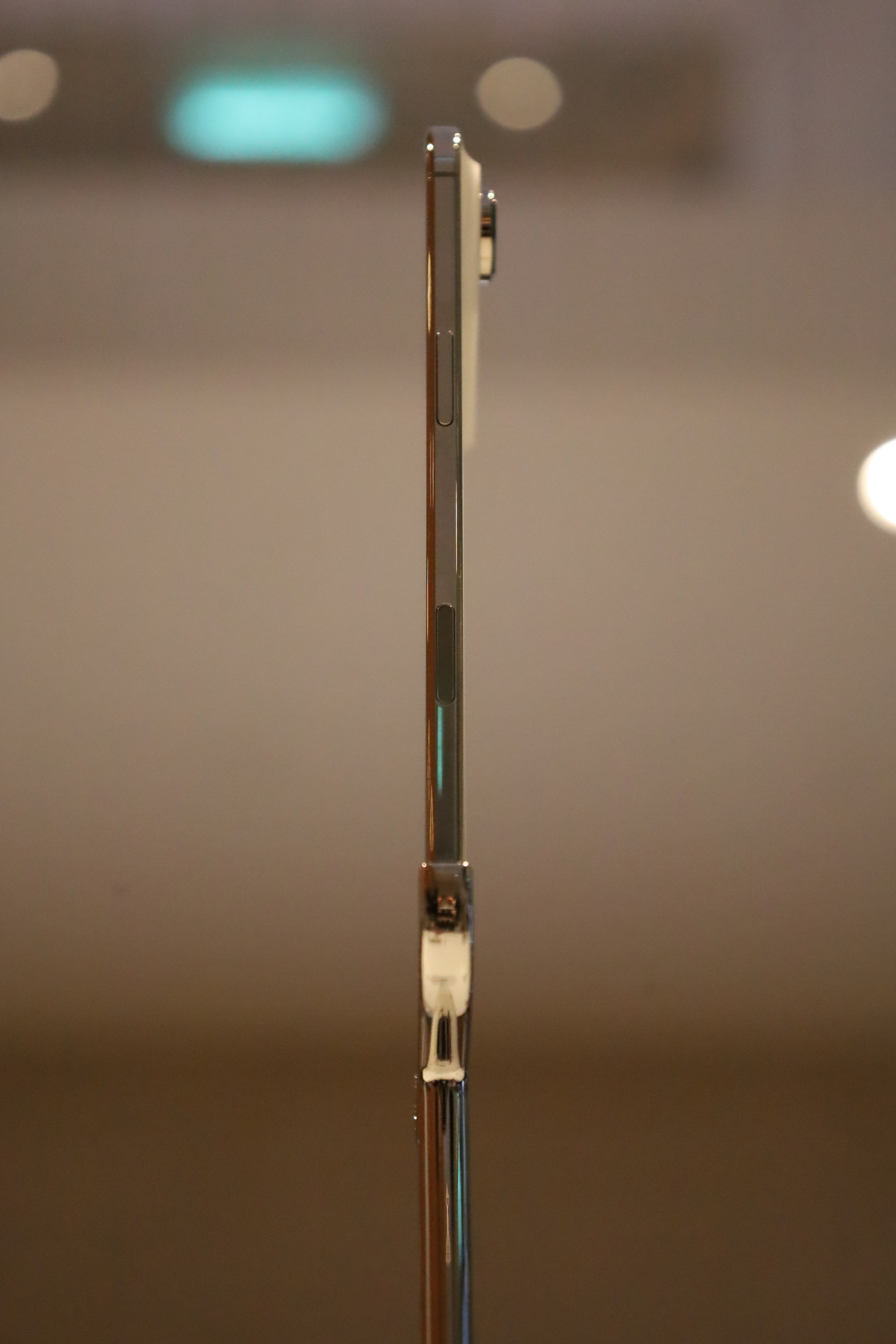
On release, the iPhone Air was the thinnest iPhone model ever developed by Apple, surpassing the iPhone 6.

The iPhone Air features a slim body and a flat-sided titanium frame with softened edges. It is lightest of the nineteenth generation of iPhones, as well as the only model to retain a titanium build. The front glass uses Ceramic Shield 2 with a new anti-reflective coating. The back glass is protected by Ceramic Shield and has an elevated oval area called a plateau. This area houses the cameras, speaker, and logic board. The iPhone Air is available in four colors: Sky Blue, Light Gold, Cloud White, and Space Black.

Color	Image	Name
		Sky Blue
		Light Gold
		Cloud White
		Space Black

== Specifications ==
=== Chipset ===
The iPhone Air features the A19 Pro system-on-chip (SoC) with a six-core CPU, five-core GPU, and a 16-core Neural Engine. It uses the new Apple-designed C1X modem and N1 networking chips, part of a trend by Apple to reduce reliance on third-party suppliers. The N1 chip includes Wi-Fi 7, Bluetooth 6, and Thread.

=== Display ===
The iPhone Air has a 6.5-inch (170 mm) Super Retina XDR OLED display with 3000 nits peak brightness and a dynamic refresh rate of up to 120 Hz. The display has a resolution of 2736×1260 at 460 pixels per inch. It has always-on functionality and adjusts down to 1 Hz when not in use.

=== Camera ===
The iPhone Air features a 48 MP Fusion camera system with a single lens. As it lacks an ultrawide lens, it does not have a macrophotography mode and cannot take spatial photos.

The front of the device features an 18 MP Center Stage camera. The front camera has the first square sensor on an iPhone, which enables expanding the field of view or rotating from portrait to landscape orientation for group shots, independent of the device orientation.

=== Charging and transfer speeds ===
The device is equipped with a USB-C port that supports USB 2.0 speeds and charging; however, unlike other USB-C iPhone models, it does not support DisplayPort video output.

=== Connectivity ===
All iPhone Air units support eSIM, and are sold without physical SIM card support worldwide. Previously, models without physical SIM card support (starting with the iPhone 14 series) had been sold only in the United States; the iPhone 17 and 17 Pro continue this trend by offering physical SIM card support in models sold outside the US.

According to ifanr, Apple created the eSIM Carrier Activation feature to meet China's regulatory requirement of in-person eSIM activation. This involves an NFC reader at carrier stores to obtain device info after identity verification, after which the phone will automatically download and activate the pre-configured eSIM. Apple's Mathias added that eSIM Quick Transfer will be launched in mainland China, which will allow users to move eSIMs to new devices without returning to the store.

=== Security ===
Starting with all iPhone 17 models and the iPhone Air, devices based on the A19 and A19 Pro include Memory Integrity Enforcement (MIE). MIE is an always-on, hardware-and-OS, memory-safety defense that uses Apple's secure memory allocators, Enhanced Memory Tagging Extension (EMTE) in synchronous mode, and Tag Confidentiality Enforcement policies. By default, MIE hardens key attack surfaces including the kernel and over 70 userland processes while preserving performance. Apple states that MIE targets mercenary spyware by making end-to-end exploit chains significantly more expensive and difficult to develop and maintain.

== Release and pricing ==
At launch, the iPhone Air had a starting price of US$999. Pre-orders began on September 12, 2025, and sales started on September 19. On September 9, 2026, the starting price of the iPhone Air was raised to US$1099.

=== Availability by region ===
September 19, 2025

- Australia
- Austria
- Bahrain
- Brazil
- Belgium
- Bulgaria
- Canada
- Croatia
- Czech Republic
- Denmark
- Finland
- France
- Germany
- Greece
- Hong Kong
- Hungary
- India
- Italy
- Ireland
- Japan
- Luxembourg
- Macao
- Malaysia
- Mexico
- Netherlands
- New Zealand
- Norway
- Oman
- Poland
- Portugal
- Qatar
- Romania
- Saudi Arabia
- Serbia
- Singapore
- Slovakia
- South Africa
- South Korea
- Spain
- Sweden
- Switzerland
- Taiwan
- Thailand
- Turkey
- United Arab Emirates
- United Kingdom
- United States
- Vietnam

October 12, 2025

- Bangladesh

October 17, 2025

- Indonesia
- Philippines

October 22, 2025

- China

== Reception ==
The Central News Agency tested the iPhone Air, finding its battery life on par with the iPhone 17 Pro and its photo quality excellent. The agency did, however, point out its restricted camera framing and insufficient gaming performance.

Preceded by First	iPhone; 19th generation alongside iPhone 17 and iPhone 17 Pro / 17 Pro Max	Succeeded by Most recent
