= ISight =

Webcam brand by Apple

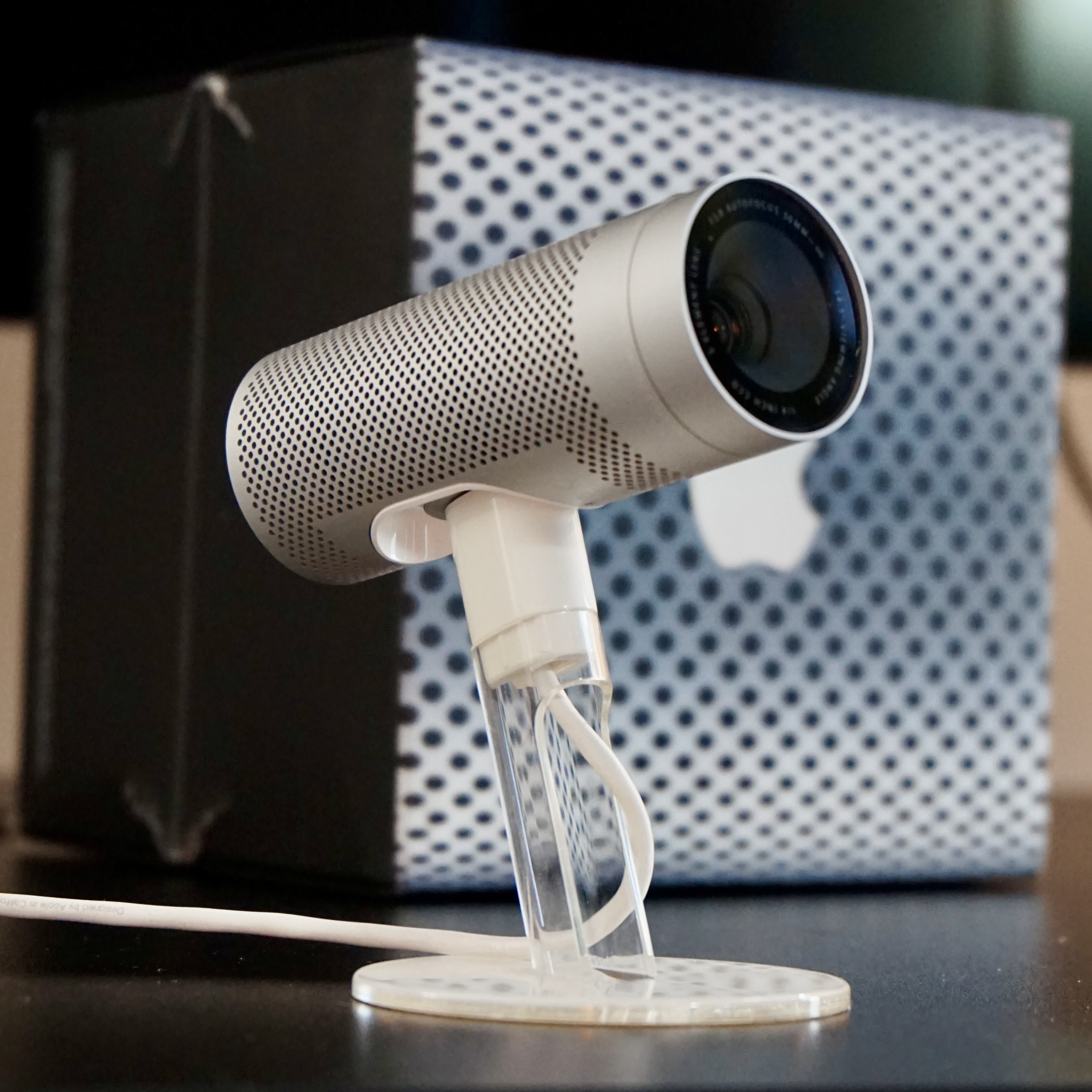
External iSight camera

iSight is a brand name used by Apple Inc. that primarily refers to a series of cameras used in its products. The name was originally used for the external iSight webcam announced in 2003. The device retailed for US$149, connected via FireWire, and came with a set of mounts for Apple displays and computers.

Apple later used the iSight name to refer to front-facing cameras built into the iMac, MacBook, MacBook Air, MacBook Pro, Thunderbolt Display, and Cinema Display. In November 2010, Apple began referring to front-facing cameras as "FaceTime cameras," and briefly referred to the rear cameras on iPhone (up to iPhone 4), iPod Touch, iPad devices as “iSight” cameras.

The original iSight external webcam was discontinued in 2006 and remains Apple's last standalone camera device. Apple gradually discontinued use of iSight branding throughout the 2010s.

== External iSight camera ==
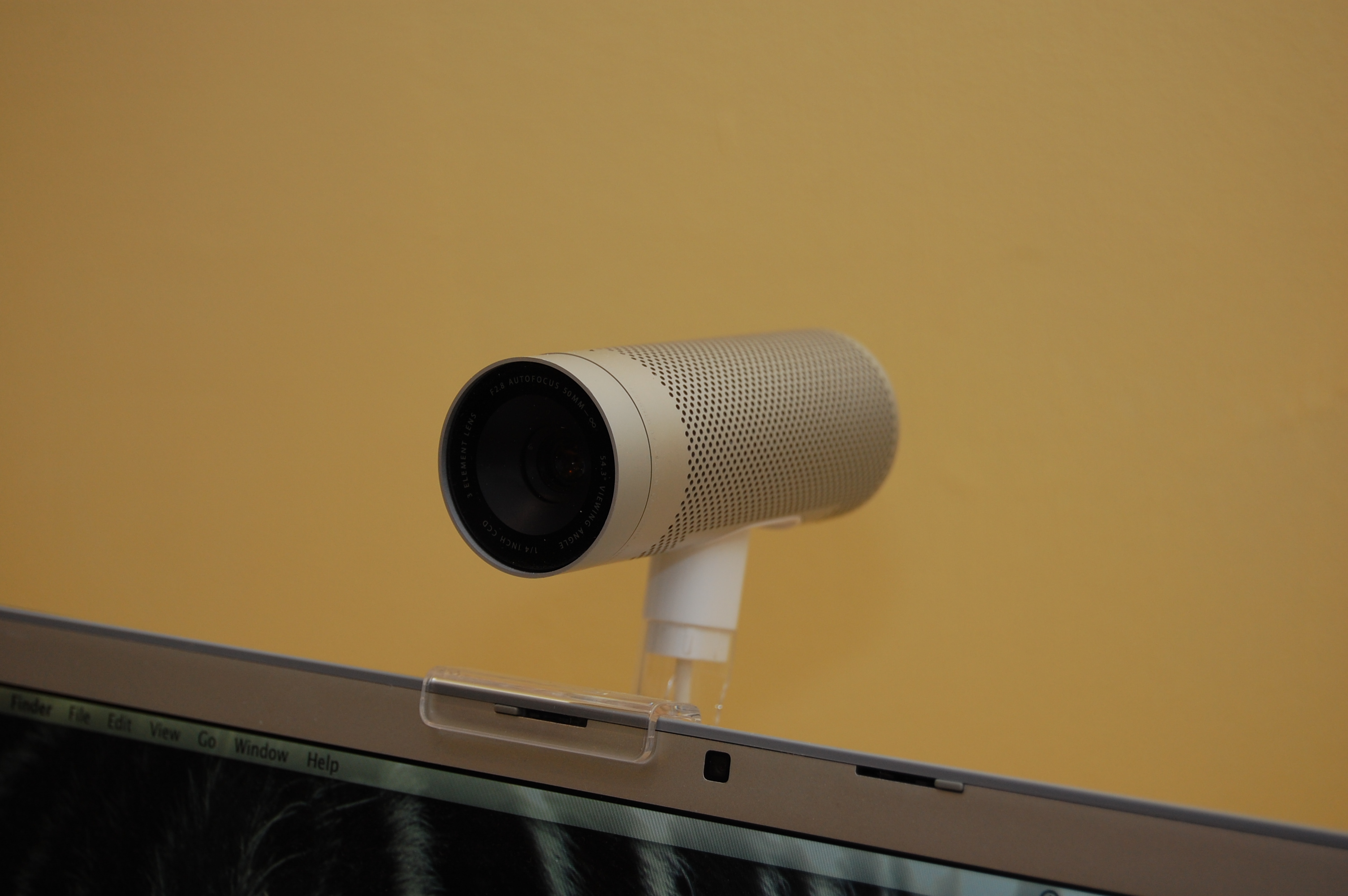
External iSight camera attached to a MacBook Pro

Apple introduced the original iSight camera at the 2003 Worldwide Developers Conference alongside iChat AV. It featured an aluminum body, a ¼-inch color CCD sensor with 640×480-pixel VGA resolution, and an f/2.8 lens with two aspherical elements. It also supported autofocus (50 mm to infinity), autoexposure, and video capture at 30 frames per second in 24-bit color with a variety of shutter speeds. It used a single FireWire 400 (IEEE 1394a) cable for audio, video, and power. The device incorporated internal microphones with dual-element noise suppression. The iSight camera weighed 2.3 ounces (63.8 grams). A small green LED illuminated when the camera was in use. It also included a privacy shutter that could be closed by twisting the camera front.

Varying camera mounts, including a later magnetic adapter, were included. The device was fully compatible with macOS, and partially compatible with the Microsoft Windows and Linux-based operating systems.

Apple discontinued the external iSight camera in December 2006. It was the second and last standalone camera device line created by Apple, with the first having been the Apple QuickTake.

== Built-in iSight camera ==
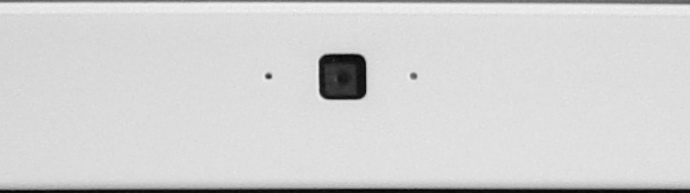
Built-in iSight webcam on a MacBook

Apple has also used the "iSight" brand to refer to built-in video cameras in MacBook laptops, iMac desktops, and the LED Cinema Display. Built-in iSight cameras used an internal USB 2.0 interface, not the FireWire 400 (IEEE 1394a) interface used by the external iSight camera. Further, built-in iSight cameras used plastic lenses, had fixed focal distances, and used CMOS active pixel sensors, rather than the CCD used in the external iSight. LED-Backlit MacBook Pros upgraded the built-in iSight webcams to 1280x1024 pixels. The built-in iSight camera was a popular companion to the Photo Booth app.

=== Security concerns ===
Some MacBooks were reported to be affected by the iSeeYou vulnerability, potentially allowing their iSight cameras to record the user without the user's knowledge.

== Replacement with FaceTime Camera Branding ==
With the June 2010 release of the iPhone 4, Apple introduced the FaceTime communication platform. Simultaneously, the company began refer to the integrated front-facing camera on the device as "FaceTime Camera," replacing "iSight."

In 2011, the iSight branding on cameras built-in to displays on the MacBook Pro and iMac was renamed to FaceTime camera. The FaceTime HD cameras included with the 2011 and later models of the MacBook Pro and iMac can output 720p high-definition video. The iMac Pro, released in December 2017, introduced a newer generation FaceTime HD camera that output 1080p video.

In March 2012, with the release of the third generation iPad, Apple re-introduced iSight camera branding but for the device's rear camera. Similar changes were made with iPhone and iPod Touch releases (retroactively, in the cases of older models still being sold at the time). In general, rear-facing iSight-branded cameras captured higher-resolution photos, whereas front-facing "FaceTime Cameras" had lower-resolutions and were used for video conversations.

Apple would once again discontinue use of the iSight branding in 2015, starting with the release of the iPhone 6s and the release of Live Photos. Apple began discontinuing the use of the FaceTime camera branding with the iPhone X in 2017.

Starting with the M4 models of the iMac, MacBook Pro, and MacBook Air, as well as the Studio Display and Studio Display XDR, the built-in video camera now takes screenshots at a resolution of 12MP and support face tracking. The camera technology is referred to as Center Stage.
