= Apple A19 =

System-on-a-chip designed by Apple Inc.

Apple A19 series
General information
- Launched: September 19, 2025
- Designed by: Apple Inc.
- Common manufacturer: TSMC
- Product code: A19: Tilos; A19 Pro: Thera

Physical specifications
- Cores: 2 p-cores @ 4.26 GHz + 4 e-cores @ 2.60 GHz
- Memory (RAM): A19: 8 GB; A19 Pro: 12 GB; (LPDDR5X)
- GPUs: A19: 4-core (iPhone 17e); 5-core (iPhone 17); A19 Pro: 5-core: (iPhone Air); 6-core: (iPhone 17 Pro, iPhone 17 Pro Max)
- Co-processor: NPU: 35 TOPS (16 cores)

Cache
- L2 cache: A19: 8 MB (p-cores), 4 MB (e-cores); A19 Pro: 16 MB (p-cores), 6 MB (e-cores)
- L3 cache: A19: 12 MB; A19 Pro: 32 MB

Architecture and classification
- Application: A19: iPhone 17, iPhone 17e, Studio Display, Apple TV 4K (4th generation); A19 Pro: iPhone Air, iPhone 17 Pro, iPhone 17 Pro Max, Studio Display XDR
- Technology node: 3 nm (TSMC N3P)
- Instruction set: ARM64

History
- Predecessor: Apple A18
- Successor: Apple A20 Pro

The Apple A19 and Apple A19 Pro are a pair of 64-bit ARM-based systems on a chip (SoC) designed by Apple Inc., part of the Apple silicon series. The A19 is used in the iPhone 17, iPhone 17e, and the fourth-generation Apple TV 4K, while the A19 Pro is used in the iPhone 17 Pro, iPhone 17 Pro Max, and iPhone Air. Both chips are manufactured by TSMC using the N3P variant of their 3 nm process node. Announced on September 9, 2025, they are the successors to the Apple A18 and Apple A18 Pro processors, respectively.

== Design ==
=== CPU ===
Both the A19 and A19 Pro feature a 6-core CPU architecture with two performance cores and four efficiency cores, operating at frequencies up to 4.26 GHz for performance cores and 2.60 GHz for efficiency cores. The A19 Pro variant includes enhanced cache configurations and improved front-end bandwidth and branch prediction on the performance cores.

The performance cores in the A19 feature 8MB of L2 cache, while the efficiency cores have 4MB. The A19 Pro increases this to 16MB for performance cores and 6MB for efficiency cores. Additionally, the A19 includes a 12MB system-level cache, expanded to 32MB in the A19 Pro.

=== GPU ===
The A19 features a 4-core or 5-core Apple-designed GPU (80 execution units, 640 ALUs, 5 clusters) based on the new Apple10 architecture, while the A19 Pro includes both 5-core and 6-core configurations depending on the device (96 execution units, 768 ALUs, 6 clusters). The iPhone 17e uses the A19 with a 4-core GPU, unlike the iPhone 17 which has a 5-core GPU. The iPhone Air uses the A19 Pro with a 5-core GPU, while the iPhone 17 Pro and Pro Max feature the full 6-core GPU configuration.

The Apple10 architecture introduces doubled FP16 performance compared to previous generations and includes dedicated tensor processing units called "Neural Accelerators" integrated into each GPU core. These units are optimized for matrix multiplication operations in machine learning workloads, enabling approximately up to four times the peak GPU compute performance on the A19 Pro compared to the A18 Pro. The architecture also includes updated dynamic caching and unified image compression.

=== Neural engine ===
Apple states that the A19's 16-core Neural Engine is capable of 35 trillion operations per second (35 TOPS). The same Neural Engine was used in the Apple A17 and Apple A18, although Apple states that the A19 Pro performs faster than the A18, attributing the improvement to increased memory bandwidth ration, and the GPU's integrated Neural Accelerators.

=== Memory and media ===
The A19 series supports LPDDR5X memory with different specifications between variants. The A19 includes 8GB of LPDDR5X (8533 MT/s) memory providing 68.2 GB/s of memory bandwidth, while the A19 Pro features 12GB of LPDDR5X (9600 MT/s) memory with bandwidth up to 76.8 GB/s. Both chips include updated display engines and image signal processors, with the A19 Pro exclusively supporting Apple ProRes RAW recording in addition to standard H.264, H.265, and ProRes formats.

=== Security ===
Starting with all iPhone 17 models and iPhone Air, devices based on the A19 and A19 Pro include Memory Integrity Enforcement (MIE), a hardware and software-based memory safety system utilizing ARM's Enhanced Memory Tagging Extension (EMTE) in synchronous mode. The system operates continuously to defend against buffer overflow and use-after-free vulnerabilities while protecting against side-channel attacks.

=== Thermal management ===
The A19 Pro includes enhanced thermal management in the iPhone 17 Pro and Pro Max models, featuring a vapor chamber containing deionized water, laser-welded into the aluminum unibody. This helps move heat away from the A19 Pro chip, enabling up to 40% better sustained performance during demanding tasks, such as video editing, gaming, and large language model processing.

== Performance ==
According to initial benchmarks, the A19 demonstrates approximately 12% higher single-core CPU performance compared to the A18, with multi-core performance improvements of around 18% on Geekbench 6. GPU performance shows gains of approximately 33% over the A18.

The A19 Pro increased single-core performance by approximately 15% and multi-core by 20% compared to the A18 Pro. GPU performance increased by ~27%, while sustained performance is ~36% higher on the iPhone 17 Pro compared to the 16 Pro.

== Products that include the A19 series ==
=== A19 ===
- iPhone 17e – 4-core GPU
- iPhone 17 – 5-core GPU
- Apple Studio Display (second generation)
- Apple TV 4K (fourth generation) – 5-core CPU

=== A19 Pro ===
- iPhone Air – 5-core GPU
- iPhone 17 Pro – 6-core GPU
- iPhone 17 Pro Max – 6-core GPU
- Apple Studio Display XDR

== Technical specifications ==
Specification		A19		A19 Pro
Codename		Tilos		Thera
Part Number		T8150		
Fabrication Process		3 nm (TSMC N3P)		
CPU	Cores	2 performance (P) + 4 efficiency (E)		
CPU	Clock speed	4.26 GHz (P), 2.60 GHz (E)		
Cache	L1 instruction	192 KB (P), 128 KB (E)		
Cache	L1 data	128 KB (P), 64 KB (E)		
Cache	L2	8 MB (P), 4 MB (E)		16 MB (P), 6 MB (E)
Cache	L3	12 MB		32 MB
GPU	Cores	4	5	6
GPU	SIMD EUs	16	20	24
GPU	FP32 ALUs	512	640	768
GPU	Clock speed	1.62 GHz		
FP32		1.659 TFLOPS	2.074 TFLOPS	2.488 TFLOPS
AI cores		16		
RAM	Size	8 GB		12 GB
RAM	Type	LPDDR5X-8533		LPDDR5X-9600
RAM	Clock speed	4.266 GHz		4.8 GHz
RAM	Bus width	64-bit		
RAM	Bandwidth	68.3 GB/s		76.8 GB/s

== See also ==
- Apple silicon
- System on a chip
- Apple M5
