= Retina display =

High-resolution display brand by Apple

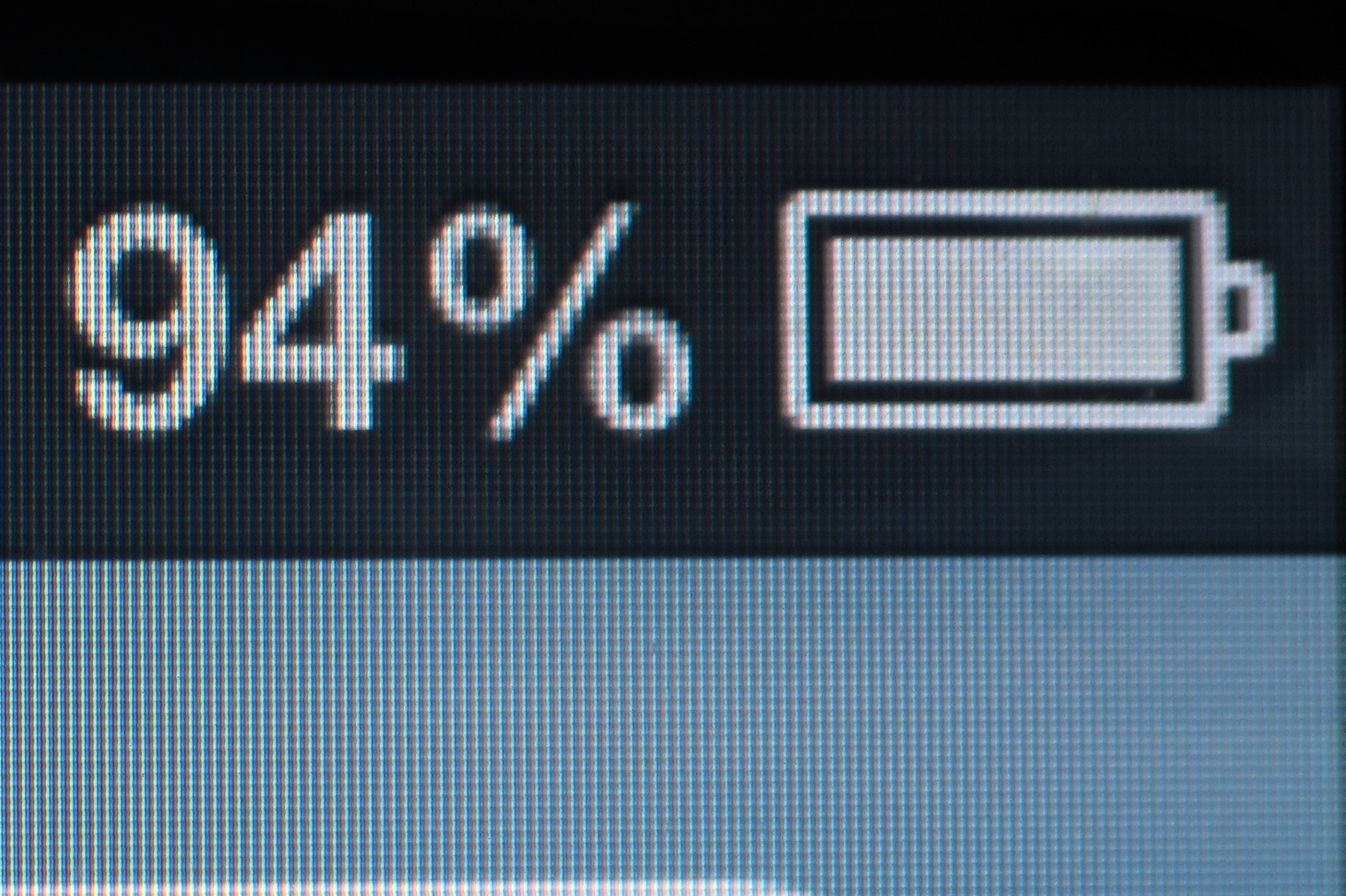
Part of the Retina display on an iPhone 4. The pixels are not visible at normal viewing distance, creating an impression of sharp, print-like text.

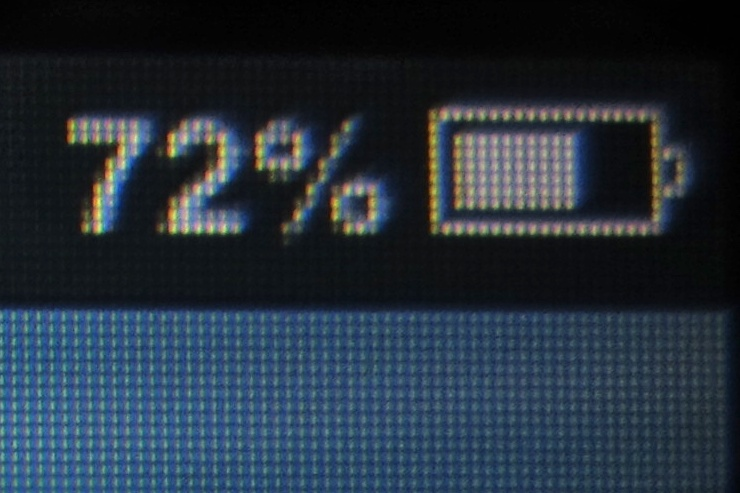
Part of the non-Retina display on an iPhone 3GS. The pixels are visible at normal viewing distance.

Retina display is a branded series of LCDs and OLED displays by Apple Inc. that have a higher pixel density than their traditional displays. Apple has registered the term "Retina" as a trademark with regard to computers and mobile devices with the United States Patent and Trademark Office and Canadian Intellectual Property Office. The applications were approved in 2012 and 2014, respectively.

The Retina display debuted in 2010 with the iPhone 4 and the iPod Touch (4th generation), and later the iPad (3rd generation) where each screen pixel of the iPhone 3GS, iPod Touch (3rd generation), and iPad 2 was replaced by four smaller pixels, and the user interface scaled up to fill in the extra pixels. Apple calls this mode HiDPI mode. In simpler words, it is one logical pixel that corresponds to four physical pixels. The scale factor is tripled for devices with even higher pixel densities, such as the iPhone 6 Plus and iPhone X. The advantage of this equation is that the CPU "sees" a small portion of the data and calculates the relative positions of each element, and the GPU renders these elements with high-quality assets. The goal of Retina displays is to make the text and images being displayed crisper.

The Retina display has since expanded to most Apple product lines, such as Apple Watch, iPhone, iPod Touch, iPad, iPad Mini, iPad Air, iPad Pro, MacBook, MacBook Neo, MacBook Air, MacBook Pro, iMac, and Apple's computer monitors such as the Studio Display, Pro Display XDR, and Studio Display XDR, some of which have never had non-Retina displays. Apple uses various marketing terms to differentiate between its LCD and OLED displays having various resolutions, contrast levels, color reproduction, or refresh rates. It is known as Liquid Retina display for the iPhone XR, iPad Air (4th generation), iPad Mini (6th generation), iPad Pro (3rd generation) and later models, and Retina 4.5K display for the iMac.

Apple's Retina displays do not have a fixed minimum pixel density, but vary depending on and at what distance the user would typically be viewing the screen. Where on smaller devices held or worn closer to the user's eyes, such as watches and phones, the displays must have very high pixel density for the pixels to be indiscernible to the user, for displays viewed from farther away, such as those of notebook or desktop computers, slightly less pixel density is required in order to achieve the same angular resolution. Later products have had additional improvements, such as an increase in the screen size, contrast ratio, or pixel density. Apple has used names such as Retina HD display, Retina 5K display, Super Retina HD display, Super Retina XDR display, and Liquid Retina display for various iterations.

== Rationale and detractors ==
When introducing the iPhone 4, Steve Jobs said the density of pixels needed for a Retina display is about 300 ppi (120 dot/cm) for a device held 10 to 12 inches (25 to 30 cm) from the eye. This definition includes the distance from the screen to the observer (the viewing distance), because moving the eye closer to the display makes it easier to see detail up close, and moving away makes it harder. One metric that takes into account both the pixel density of a screen and the viewing distance is angular pixel density, typically expressed in units of pixels per degree (PPD). For pixels centered in the field of vision spanning a small visual angle, the angular pixel density can be approximated as:

$$\frac{\pi}{360 \arctan \left (\frac{0.5}{d r}\right)}$$

where $d$ is the distance between the screen and observer (e.g. in meters), and $r$ is the absolute pixel density of the screen in pixels per unit length (e.g. in pixels per meter).

Based on Jobs' statement, the threshold for a Retina display is an angular pixel density of 52–63 PPD. For example, holding a phone 11 in (28 cm) away, the value of 58 PPD means that a tall skinny triangle emanating from the eye with a height equal to the viewing distance and a top angle of one degree will have a base on the device's screen that covers 58 pixels.

The essence of Retina display is to eliminate the appearance of graininess on a screen, for example when displaying complex languages (for example Arabic, Hebrew and CJKV) on a screen.

A Retina display may also include hardware support for wide-color gamut, such as DCI-P3.

Many authors have challenged Apple's claim. For example, Raymond Soneira, president of DisplayMate Technologies, said that the physiology of the human retina is such that there must be at least 477 pixels per inch in a pixelated display for the pixels to become imperceptible to the human eye at a distance of 12 inches (305 mm), corresponding to 0.6 arcminutes per pixel or 100 PPD. John Brownlee, in an article at Apple fan website CultOfMac, stated that the threshold to discern individual pixels is between 0.3 and 0.4 arcminutes (150–200 PPD). Others have defended Apple. Astronomer and science blogger Phil Plait stated that a resolution of 0.6 arcminutes corresponds to "perfect eyesight" but that "a better number for a typical person is more like 1 arcmin resolution, not 0.6", corresponding to 20/20 vision or 60 PPD. Plait argued that what Jobs said was fine as the iPhone 4S's resolution is better than 1 arcmin. The retinal neuroscientist Bryan Jones cites a paper calculating 0.78 arcminutes per cycle of retinal resolution (corresponding to 77 PPD), and states the optics of the system may degrade image quality somewhat, thus giving the commonly accepted resolution of 1 arcminute. Soneira has replied that "If you allow poor vision to enter into the specs, then any display becomes a retina display. That turns it into a meaningless concept that will be exploited by everyone." A 2024 study found that the eye had resolution limits of 94 PPD for foveal achromatic vision, 89 PPD for red–green patterns, and 53 PPD for yellow–violet patterns.

== Models ==
In practice, thus far, Apple has converted a device's display to Retina by doubling the number of pixels in each direction, quadrupling the total resolution. This increase creates a sharper interface at the same physical dimensions. The only exceptions to this have been the iPhone 6 Plus, 6S Plus, 7 Plus, and 8 Plus, which render their images at triple the number of pixels in each direction, before down-sampling to 1080p resolution.

The displays are manufactured worldwide by different suppliers. In 2012, the iPad's display came from Samsung, while the MacBook Pro display was made by LG Display. There was a shift of display technology from twisted nematic (TN) liquid-crystal displays (LCDs) to in-plane switching (IPS) LCDs starting with the iPhone 4 models in June 2010.

In 2014, the iPhone 6 was released in two models. The basic iPhone 6 had the same ppi as the iPhone 5, while the iPhone 6 Plus, with 401 ppi, was marketed as a Retina HD display. Around the same time, other phone manufacturers like Samsung, HTC, and LG released phones with higher pixel densities, some exceeding 500 ppi. By 2025, most smartphones surpassed the original Retina display threshold, with even lower-end models exceeding 300 ppi. Typical pixel densities at the beginning of 2025 ranged from around 260 ppi to over 600 ppi. The iPhone 17, released in September 2025, has 460 ppi.

Apple handheld devices featuring Retina displays and the first Retina HD screens:

Model	Marketing name	Screen size	Resolution	Aspect Ratio	Pixel density		Pixel size (μm)	Angular pixel density (px/°; at typ. distance)	typ. viewing distance	Total pixels
Model	Marketing name	Screen size	Resolution	Aspect Ratio	ppi	px/cm	Pixel size (μm)	Angular pixel density (px/°; at typ. distance)	typ. viewing distance	Total pixels
iPhone 4, 4S and iPod Touch 4	Retina display	3.5 in (89 mm)	960×640	2:3	326	128	77.9	56.9	10 in (25 cm)	614,400
iPhone 5, 5C, 5S and SE 1, iPod Touch 5, 6 and 7	Retina display	4.0 in (100 mm)	1136×640	9:16	326	128	77.9	56.9	10 in (25 cm)	727,040
iPhone 6, 6S, and 7	Retina HD display	4.7 in (120 mm)	1334×750	9:16	326	128	77.9	56.9	10 in (25 cm)	1,000,500
iPhone 6 Plus, 6S Plus, and 7 Plus	Retina HD display	5.5 in (140 mm)	1920×1080	9:16	401	158	63.4	70.0	10 in (25 cm)	2,073,600
iPad Mini 2, 3, and 4	Retina display	7.9 in (200 mm)	2048×1536	3:4	326	128	77.9	85.3	15 in (38 cm)	3,145,728
iPad 3, 4, Air 1 and 2, Pro 9.7-inch	Retina display	9.7 in (250 mm)	2048×1536	3:4	264	104	96	69.1	15 in (38 cm)	3,145,728

== Reception ==
Reviews of Apple devices with Retina displays have generally been positive on technical grounds, with comments describing it as a considerable improvement on earlier screens and praising Apple for driving third-party application support for high-resolution displays more effectively than on Windows. While high-dpi displays such as IBM's T220 and T221 had been sold in the past, they had seen little take-up due to their cost of around $8400.

Reviewing the iPhone 4 in 2010, Joshua Topolsky commented:

"to our eyes, there has never been a more detailed, clear, or viewable screen on any mobile device. Not only are the colors and blacks deep and rich, but you simply cannot see pixels on the screen...webpages that would be line after line of pixelated content when zoomed out on a 3GS are completely readable on the iPhone 4, though the text is beyond microscopic."

Former Microsoft employee Bill Hill, an expert on font rendering, offered similar comments:

That much resolution is stunning. To see it on a mainstream device like the iPad—rather than a $13,000 exotic monitor—is truly amazing, and something I've been waiting more than a decade to see. It will set a bar for future resolution that every other manufacturer of devices and PCs will have to jump.

Writer John Gruber suggested that the arrival of Retina displays on computers would trigger a need to redesign interfaces and designs for the new displays:

The sort of rich, data-dense information design espoused by Edward Tufte can now not only be made on the computer screen but also enjoyed on one. Regarding font choices, you not only need not choose a font optimized for rendering on screen, but should not. Fonts optimized for screen rendering look cheap on the retina MacBook Pro—sometimes downright cheesy—in the same way they do when printed in a glossy magazine.

== Competitors ==
Two years prior to the release of device with a high-density screen from Apple, HTC released the HTC Touch Diamond with a 286 ppi screen. In October 2008, the Sony Ericsson Xperia X1 was one of the first smartphones which offered higher resolution than the VGA screens seen before, with an 800 × 480 screen at 311 ppi.

The first Android smartphone with a similar display, the Meizu M9, was launched in the beginning of 2011. In October of the same year the Galaxy Nexus was announced, which had a display with a better resolution. By 2013 the 300+ ppi mark was found on midrange phones such as the Moto G. From 2013 to 2014, many flagship devices such as the Samsung Galaxy S4 and HTC One (M8) had 1080p (FHD) screens around five inches with 400+ ppi which surpassed the Retina density on the iPhone 5.

The second major redesign of the iPhone, the iPhone 6, has a 1334 × 750 resolution on a 4.7-inch screen, while rivals such as the Samsung Galaxy S6 have a QHD display of 2560 × 1440 resolution, close to four times the number of pixels found in the iPhone 6, giving the S6 a 577 ppi that is almost twice that of the iPhone 6's 326 ppi. The larger iPhone 6 Plus features a "Retina HD display", which is a 5.5-inch 1080p screen with 401 ppi.

Aside from resolution, all generations of iPhone Retina displays receive high ratings for other aspects such as brightness and color accuracy, compared to those of contemporary smartphones, while some Android devices such as the LG G3 have sacrificed screen quality and battery life for high resolution. Ars Technica has suggested the "superfluousness of so many flagship phone features—the move from 720p to 1080p to 1440p and beyond...things are all nice to have, but you'd be hard-pressed to argue that any of them are essential". Furthermore, developers can better optimize content for iOS due to Apple's few screen sizes in contrast to Android's wide display format variations.

Many Windows-based Ultrabook models have offered 1080p (FHD) screens standard since 2012 and often QHD or QHD+ as optional upgrade displays.

== See also ==
- Resolution independence
- Pixel density
  - HiDPI
- Pixelplus
