= Apple Studio Display (2022–present) =

Line of computer monitors by Apple

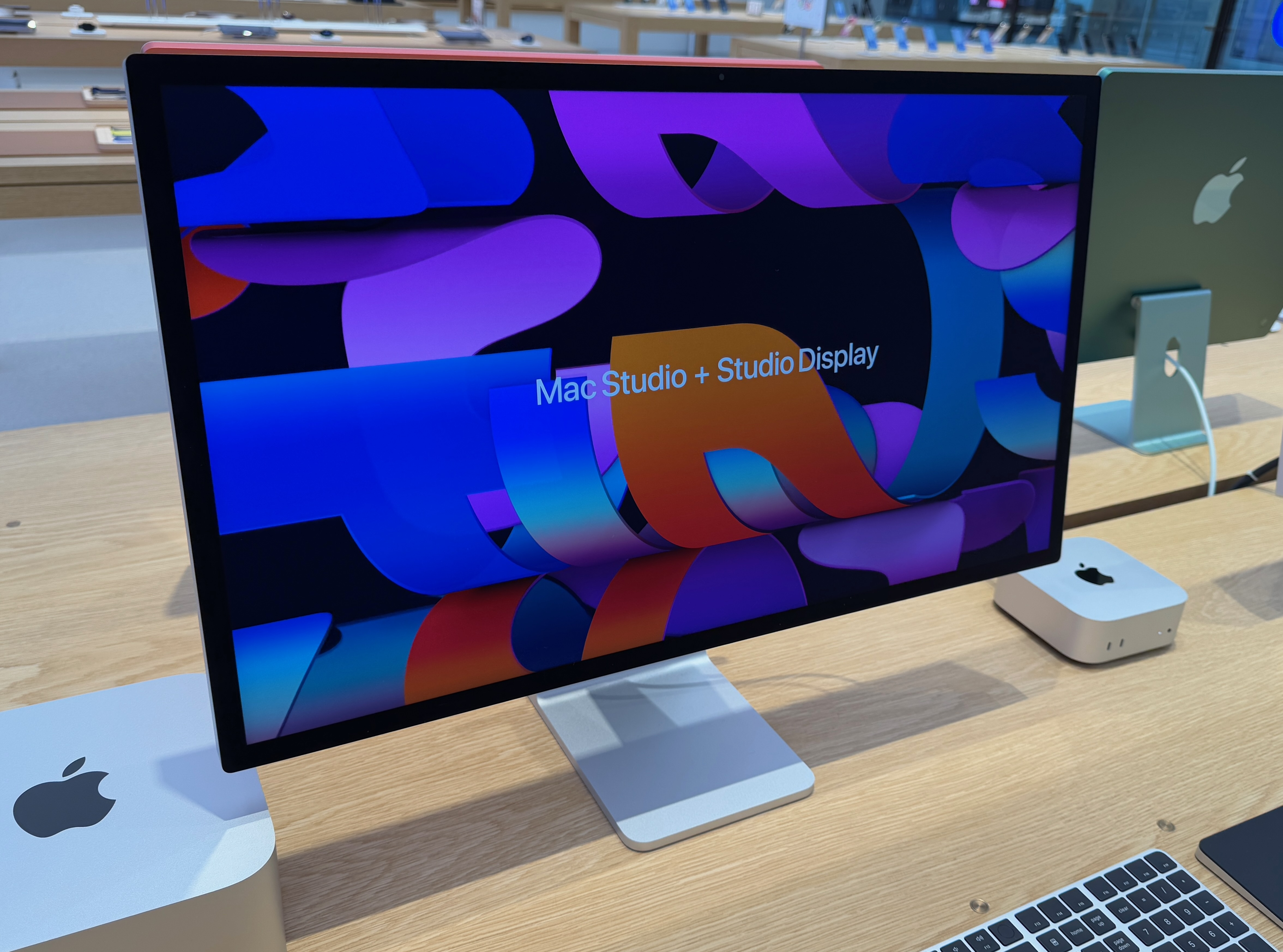
- Developer: Apple Inc.
- Type: Computer monitor
- Released: March 18, 2022; 4 years ago (first generation); March 11, 2026; 7 months ago (second generation and XDR)
- Introductory price: $1599 (first and second generation with standard glass) $1899 (first and second generation nano-texture glass) $3299 (XDR with standard glass) $3599 (XDR with nano-texture glass)
- Discontinued: March 3, 2026; 7 months ago (first generation)
- Operating system: Studio Display Firmware (iOS 17 distribution)
- Current firmware: Studio Display Firmware 17
- Predecessor: LG UltraFine (Apple-endorsed third party); Apple Thunderbolt Display (Apple-branded); Pro Display XDR (to Studio Display XDR)
- Related: Pro Display XDR (to first generation)
- Website: Official website

The Apple Studio Display (marketed as Studio Display) is a line of 27 in (690 mm) flat panel computer monitors developed and sold by Apple Inc. The first generation Studio Display was announced on March 8, 2022, alongside the Mac Studio desktop, and was released on March 18, 2022. It was sold alongside the Pro Display XDR as a consumer option.

The second-generation Studio Display and the higher-end Studio Display XDR were released on March 11, 2026.

Apple reused the "Studio Display" name nearly 18 years later since a different display model, launched in March 1998.

== Overview ==
=== First generation (2022) ===
The first generation Studio Display is the first Apple-branded consumer display released since the Apple Thunderbolt Display was discontinued in 2016. In the interim, Apple worked with LG to design the Thunderbolt 3-enabled UltraFine line, consisting of 21.5 in (550 mm) (later revised to 24 in (610 mm)) 4K and 27-inch 5K displays. The Studio Display name was previously used for a line of displays sold by Apple from 1998 to 2004.

The Studio Display features a 27 in (690 mm), 5K LED-backlit panel, with 5120×2880 resolution at 218 pixels per inch and 600 nits of brightness, an increase from the 500 nits panel used in the LG UltraFine and 27 in (690 mm) iMac. The panel also supports P3 wide color and True Tone technology. It does not support HDR content. It also includes a six-speaker system with force-cancelling woofers that support spatial audio and Dolby Atmos, and a three-microphone array that supports talking to Siri. On the rear of the display is a Thunderbolt 3 port that supports DisplayPort 1.4 with Display Stream Compression (DSC) 1.2 and provides up to 96W of host charging for connected laptops, and three downstream 10 Gbit/s USB-C ports.

The Studio Display includes an Apple A13 Bionic system-on-a-chip, which was introduced with the iPhone 11 line, to power audio and webcam processing. The built-in webcam supports Center Stage, introduced with the iPad Pro (5th generation), which pinpoints the positions of the users and automatically tracks the camera view accordingly to perspectively center them. The A13 chip is paired with 64 GB of internal storage but only uses 2 GB at a time.

The Studio Display comes in three mounting option configurations: a tilt-adjustable stand, a tilt- and height-adjustable stand similar to the Pro Display XDR, and a VESA mount. The mounts are built into the display and are not user interchangeable, but can be reconfigured by an Apple Store or authorized service provider after purchase. Like the Pro Display XDR, it could also be configured with the optional laser-etched "nano-texture" glass finish to reduce glare.

The Studio Display has a 1.8 m (5.9 ft) proprietary power cable, which requires a special tool to separate from the display. The display comes with a braided 1 m (3 ft) Thunderbolt 3 cable, and longer braided Thunderbolt 4 Pro cables in lengths of 1.8 m (6 ft) and 3 m (10 ft) are available separately.

=== Second generation and XDR (2026) ===
The second generation Studio Display and Studio Display XDR were announced on March 3, 2026. Both include Thunderbolt 5 connectivity with a second downstream Thunderbolt port, a Center Stage camera that supports Desk View, and improved speakers. The second generation Studio Display includes an Apple A19 chip, while the Studio Display XDR has an A19 Pro chip. Both are paired with 128 GB of internal storage. In addition to the Studio Display's features, the Studio Display XDR includes Mini LED backlighting with 2,000 nits of peak brightness for HDR content, a 120 Hz refresh rate, and 140W of host charging for connected laptops. Following the announcement, the Pro Display XDR was discontinued.

== Compatibility ==
=== First generation (2022) ===
The first generation Studio Display is compatible with all Macs with Thunderbolt 3 or newer running macOS Monterey 12.3 and later:

- MacBook Pro (2016 or later)
- MacBook Air (2018 or later)
- Mac Mini (2018 or later)
- iMac (2017 or later)
- iMac Pro (2017)
- Mac Pro (2019 or later)
- Mac Studio (2022 or later)

It is also compatible with the following iPads running iPadOS 15.4 and later:

- iPad Pro (3rd generation or later)
- iPad Air (5th generation or later)

The Studio Display works with other systems supporting DisplayPort, including Windows-based systems, but only supported Macs have access to features beyond display, speakers and webcam. Intel Macs running Windows via Boot Camp are supported with version 6.1.17. Other Apple devices with DisplayPort such as the iPhone 15 and newer, 6th generation iPad Mini and newer, 10th generation iPad and newer, the 4th generation iPad Air and the MacBook Neo will output to it, but at lower upscaled resolutions.

=== Second generation and XDR (2026) ===
The second generation Studio Display and Studio Display XDR (at 60 Hz) are compatible with all Macs with an Apple M-series chip running macOS Tahoe 26.3.1 and later:

- MacBook Air (M1, 2020) or later
- MacBook Pro (M1, 2020) or later
- Mac mini (M1, 2020) or later
- iMac (M1, 2021) or later
- Mac Studio (M1 Max/Ultra, 2022) or later
- Mac Pro (M2 Ultra, 2023)

They are also compatible with the following iPads running iPadOS 26.3.1 and later:

- iPad Pro (3rd generation or later)
- iPad Air (5th generation or later)

Using the Studio Display XDR at 120 Hz requires a Mac with an M2 Pro/Max/Ultra chip, M3 Pro/Max/Ultra chip, or an M4 chip or newer, or the iPad Pro (M5). 140W charging is compatible with a 16-inch MacBook Pro with an M3 Pro/Max chip or newer.

The MacBook Neo and other Apple devices with DisplayPort running iOS/iPadOS 26.3.1 and later will output to it, but at lower upscaled resolutions.

== Technical specifications ==
		Studio Display (2022)			Studio Display (2026)			Studio Display XDR	
Timetable	Announced	March 8, 2022			March 3, 2026				
Timetable	Released	March 18, 2022			March 11, 2026				
Timetable	Discontinued	March 3, 2026			n/a				
Timetable	Unsupported	Supported							
Model number(s)		A2525			A3350			A3348	
Order number(s)		MK0U3LL/A			MFEY4LL/A			MFEL4LL/A	
Video	Display	27 inches (690 mm), IPS LCD (TFT), glossy glass or nano-texture glass covered screen, 5K (5120×2880) resolution, True Tone technology							
Video	Backlight	LED						Mini LED with 2304 dimming zones	
Video	Aspect ratio	16:9 (widescreen)							
Video	Pixel density	218 pixels per inch							
Video	Refresh rate	60 Hz						120 Hz, Adaptive Sync	
Video	Colors	P3 wide color gamut, 10-bit depth for 1.073 billion colors						P3 + Adobe RGB wide color gamuts, 10-bit depth for 1.073 billion colors	
Video	Contrast ratio	970:1						1,000,000:1	
Video	Brightness	600 nits						Up to 1000 nits (SDR), 2000 nits peak (HDR)	
System on a chip		Apple A13 Bionic			Apple A19			Apple A19 Pro	
Storage		64 GB NAND flash memory			128 GB NAND flash memory				
Input/Output	Camera	12 MP Ultra Wide camera with 122° field of view supporting Center Stage							
Input/Output	Camera	—N/a			Supports Desk View				
Input/Output	Speakers	High-fidelity six-speaker system with force-cancelling woofers supporting spatial audio and Dolby Atmos							
Input/Output	Microphone	Studio-quality three-mic array with high signal-to-noise ratio and directional beamforming and support for "Hey Siri"							
Power input		100–240 V AC @ 50–60 Hz							
Material		Aluminum frame and glass front							
Connections	Cables	AC power cord							
Connections	Peripheral connections	3× powered USB-C (10 Gbit/s) ports for peripheral devices 1× 96 W powered Thunderbolt 3 (USB-C) port			2× powered USB-C (10 Gbit/s) ports for peripheral devices 1× 96 W powered Thunderbolt 5 (USB-C) port, 1× downstream Thunderbolt 5 (USB-C) port			2× powered USB-C (10 Gbit/s) ports for peripheral devices 1× 140 W powered Thunderbolt 5 (USB-C) port, 1× downstream Thunderbolt 5 (USB-C) port	
Mounting options		Tilt-adjustable stand	Tilt- and height-adjustable stand	VESA Mount Adapter	Tilt-adjustable stand	Tilt- and height-adjustable stand	VESA Mount Adapter	Tilt- and height-adjustable stand	VESA Mount Adapter
Dimensions	Height	18.8 in (480 mm)	23 in (580 mm) – 18.8 in (480 mm)	14.3 in (360 mm)	18.8 in (480 mm)	23 in (580 mm) – 18.8 in (480 mm)	14.3 in (360 mm)	23 in (580 mm) – 18.8 in (480 mm)	14.3 in (360 mm)
Dimensions	Width × Depth	24.5 in × 1.2 in (622 mm × 30 mm)						24.5 in × 1.3 in (622 mm × 33 mm)	
Weight		13.9 lb. (6.3 kg)	16.9 lb. (7.7 kg)	12.1 lb. (5.5 kg)	13.9 lb. (6.3 kg)	16.8 lb. (7.6 kg)	11.9 lb. (5.4 kg)	18.7 lb. (8.5 kg)	13.9 lb. (6.3 kg)

== Reception ==
The Verge praised the Studio Display's macOS integration and sound and microphone quality, but criticized the webcam quality, lack of customizable mounting options, and lack of variable refresh rates, local dimming and HDR, saying it includes "panel tech that is woefully behind the curve". ZDNET praised the display's design, build quality, and color accuracy, but criticized its usability outside of an Apple ecosystem.

== See also ==
- Apple displays
  - Apple Studio Display (1998–2004)
  - Apple Cinema Display (1999–2011)
  - Apple Thunderbolt Display (2011–2016)
  - Pro Display XDR (2019–2026)
