= Apple Thunderbolt Display =

Flat panel computer monitor sold by Apple Inc.

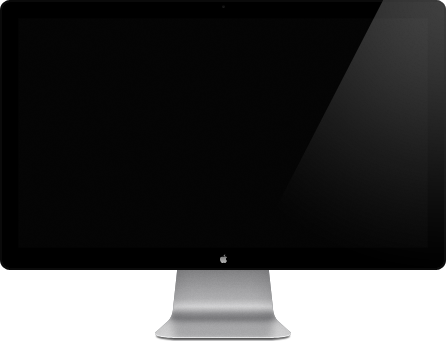
- The Apple Thunderbolt Display
- Developer: Apple Inc.
- Type: Computer monitor
- Released: July 20, 2011; 15 years ago
- Discontinued: June 23, 2016
- Predecessor: Apple Cinema Display
- Successor: LG UltraFine (consumer, Apple-endorsed third party); Apple Studio Display (consumer, Apple-branded); Pro Display XDR (professional, Apple-branded)
- Website: Official website at the Wayback Machine (archived February 7, 2015)

The Apple Thunderbolt Display is a 27 in (690 mm) flat panel computer monitor developed by Apple Inc. and sold from July 2011 to June 2016. Originally priced at $999, it replaced Apple’s 27-inch Cinema Display. It integrates a 720p webcam, speakers and a microphone, as well as Gigabit Ethernet, FireWire 800, a downstream Thunderbolt port and three USB 2.0 ports.

The Thunderbolt Display was discontinued in June 2016, and replaced by LG UltraFine displays Apple developed with LG on the consumer end, while the Pro Display XDR succeeded it in 2019 as Apple's professional display. In 2022, the Apple Studio Display was released as the first Apple-branded consumer display since its discontinuation.

The Thunderbolt Display requires a computer with a Thunderbolt port; only Mac computers are supported officially. Most Macs released since 2011 (with some exceptions) are compatible. Mac models released since 2016 are supported but require the Thunderbolt 3 to Thunderbolt 2 adapter. Despite using the same physical connector, it does not work with Mini DisplayPort input, and similarly, the adapter does not make it compatible with USB-C in general.

== Overview ==
Like its predecessor, the 27-inch LED Cinema Display, the resolution is 2560×1440 pixels in a 16:9 aspect ratio. Its chassis is made of aluminum and glass, resembling the contemporary ranges of iMac and MacBook Pro unibody designs. The display features a built-in 720p FaceTime HD camera (replacing the iSight in the previous model), microphone, and stereo speaker system with subwoofer (2.1 channel). An octopus cable with Thunderbolt and MagSafe is permanently attached to the back of the display for data and charging MacBooks, respectively. On the rear of the display is a Thunderbolt port, a FireWire 800 port, three USB 2.0 ports, and a Gigabit Ethernet port.

The Thunderbolt port allows for the possibility of daisy chaining Thunderbolt Displays from a supported Mac, or connecting other devices that have Thunderbolt ports, such as external hard drives and video capture devices. In July 2012, Apple began including a MagSafe to MagSafe 2 adaptor in the box.

=== Discontinuation and successors ===
On June 23, 2016, Apple announced through a statement it was discontinuing the Thunderbolt Display and would exit the stand-alone display market. Apple subsequently worked with LG to design the Thunderbolt 3-enabled UltraFine line, consisting of 21.5-inch (later 24-inch) 4K and 27-inch 5K displays, which were the only displays sold by Apple from 2016 to 2019. In December 2019, Apple released the Pro Display XDR, the first Apple-branded display since the Thunderbolt Display's discontinuation. In March 2022, Apple released the Apple Studio Display, the first Apple-branded consumer display since the Thunderbolt Display's discontinuation, which similarly includes integrated speakers and a webcam.

== Compatibility ==
The Thunderbolt Display drops compatibility with all previous standards, including VGA, DVI, and DisplayPort. It is not compatible with computers that do not have a Thunderbolt port, including pre-2011 Macs and the vast majority of desktop PCs. The 12-inch Retina MacBook, 2012 Mac Pro and MacBook Neo do not support Thunderbolt. The following Macs support the Thunderbolt Display without an adapter:

- MacBook Pro (2011 to 2015)
  - 2011 and non-Retina 2012 models are compatible with the MagSafe charger; Retina 2012 to 2015 models require the MagSafe to MagSafe 2 adapter
- MacBook Air (2011 to 2017)
  - 2011 models are compatible with the MagSafe charger; 2012 to 2017 models require the MagSafe to MagSafe 2 adapter
- Mac Mini (2011 to 2014)
- iMac (2011 to 2015)
- Mac Pro (2013)

Macs released after 2016 with Thunderbolt 3 and later, which uses a USB-C connector, are compatible using Apple's Thunderbolt 3-to-2 adapter. However, there is no adapter to use the MagSafe charger with laptops.

== Using multiple displays ==
=== MacBook Pro ===
- MacBook Pro (2011): 2 displays: Can daisy chain two Thunderbolt Displays together, but the laptop's LCD may turn off.
- MacBook Pro (2012): 2+2 displays: Can daisy chain two Thunderbolt Displays, in addition to one HDMI display and the MacBook Pro's own display, for four displays total.
- MacBook Pro (late 2016): Apple released a Thunderbolt 3 to Thunderbolt 2 adapter for enabling the Thunderbolt 3 ports of MacBook Pro (late 2016) to connect to Thunderbolt 2 devices.
- MacBook Pro (2017–2019): Using 2 Thunderbolt 3 to Thunderbolt 2 adapters can run four Thunderbolt Displays in addition to the built-in Retina Display for a total of 5 displays.
- MacBook Pro 13-inch M1/M2 (2020–2022): Using a Thunderbolt 3 to Thunderbolt 2 adapter it can run one Thunderbolt Display in addition to the built-in display for a total of two displays.
- MacBook Pro M1/M2 Pro (2021–2023): Using a Thunderbolt 3 to Thunderbolt 2 adapters can run two Thunderbolt Displays in addition to the built-in for a total of three.
- MacBook Pro M1/M2 Max (2021–2023): Using two Thunderbolt 3 to Thunderbolt 2 adapters it can run four Thunderbolt Displays in addition to the built-in display for a total of five displays.

=== MacBook Air ===
- MacBook Air (mid 2011): 1+1 displays: Can use one Thunderbolt Display, in addition to the MacBook Air's own display.
- MacBook Air (mid 2012 to mid 2017): 2+1 displays: Can daisy chain two Thunderbolt Displays, in addition to the MacBook Air's own display.
- MacBook Air (Intel, late 2018 to early 2020): 2+1 displays: Can daisy chain two Thunderbolt Displays, in addition to the MacBook Air's own display.
- MacBook Air (M1, 2020): 1+1 displays: Can use one Thunderbolt Display (with Thunderbolt 3 to Thunderbolt 2 adapter), in addition to the MacBook Air's own display. Further displays have to rely on virtual display output like DisplayLink or Apple Sidecar.
- MacBook Air (M2, 2022): 1+1 displays: Can use one Thunderbolt Display (with Thunderbolt 3 to Thunderbolt 2 adapter), in addition to the MacBook Air's own display. Further displays have to rely on virtual display output like DisplayLink or Apple Sidecar.

=== Mac Pro ===
- Mac Pro (late 2013): 6 displays: Can run six Thunderbolt Displays using six Thunderbolt ports.

=== Mac mini ===
- Mac mini (mid 2011): 1 display. 2 displays daisy chained: AMD version.
- Mac mini (late 2012): 2 displays daisy chained.
- Mac mini (late 2014): 2 displays.
- Mac mini (2018): 2 displays using TB3 to TB2 adapter.
- Mac mini (2020): 1 display using TB3 to TB2 adapter.
- Mac mini (2023): 1 display using TB3 to TB2 adapter.
- Mac mini M4 (2024): 2 displays using TB3 to TB2 adapter.
- Mac mini M4 Pro (2024): 3 displays using TB3 to TB2 adapter.

== Technical specifications ==
Table of models
Component	LED-backlit LCD
Model	Apple Thunderbolt Display (27-Inch)
Release date(s)	July 20, 2011
Discontinued	June 23, 2016
Model number(s)	A1407
Display	27.00 inches (68.6 cm), IPS active-matrix TFT LCD, glossy glass covered screen, QHD (2560 × 1440) resolution, LED edge-lit backlight.
Display	16∶9 aspect ratio (widescreen)
Pixel density	109 px/in
Response time	12 ms
Maximum Refresh rate	59.95 Hz
Colors	16,777,216 (8 bpc / 24 bit/px True Color)
Contrast ratio	1,000∶1
Maximum Brightness	375 cd/m^{2}
Viewing angle	178° horizontal; 178° vertical
Power input	IEC 60320 C7 port, 100–240 V AC @ 50–60 Hz (Up to 250 W while charging a MacBook Pro via MagSafe cable, 2 W or less in energy saver mode)
Material	Aluminum frame and glass front
Audio output	2.1-channel speaker system (49 W)
Cables and peripheral connections	Cables: Single cable with two connectors; Thunderbolt; MagSafe (up to 85 W); AC power cord; Peripheral connections: 3× powered USB 2.0 ports; 1× powered Thunderbolt port; 1× powered FireWire 800 port; 1× Gigabit Ethernet port
Miscellaneous	Kensington Security Slot; 720p FaceTime HD camera with microphone
Dimensions (H × W × D, with stand)	19.35 in × 25.7 in × 8.15 in (49.1 cm × 65.3 cm × 20.7 cm)
Mass	23.5 lb (10.7 kg)
System Requirements	Mac OS X 10.6.8 or later, Thunderbolt port

== See also ==
- Apple displays
  - Apple Studio Display (1998–2004)
  - Apple Cinema Display (1999–2011)
  - Apple Pro Display XDR (2019–2026)
  - Apple Studio Display (2022–current)
