= Pro Display XDR =

Computer monitor sold by Apple Inc.

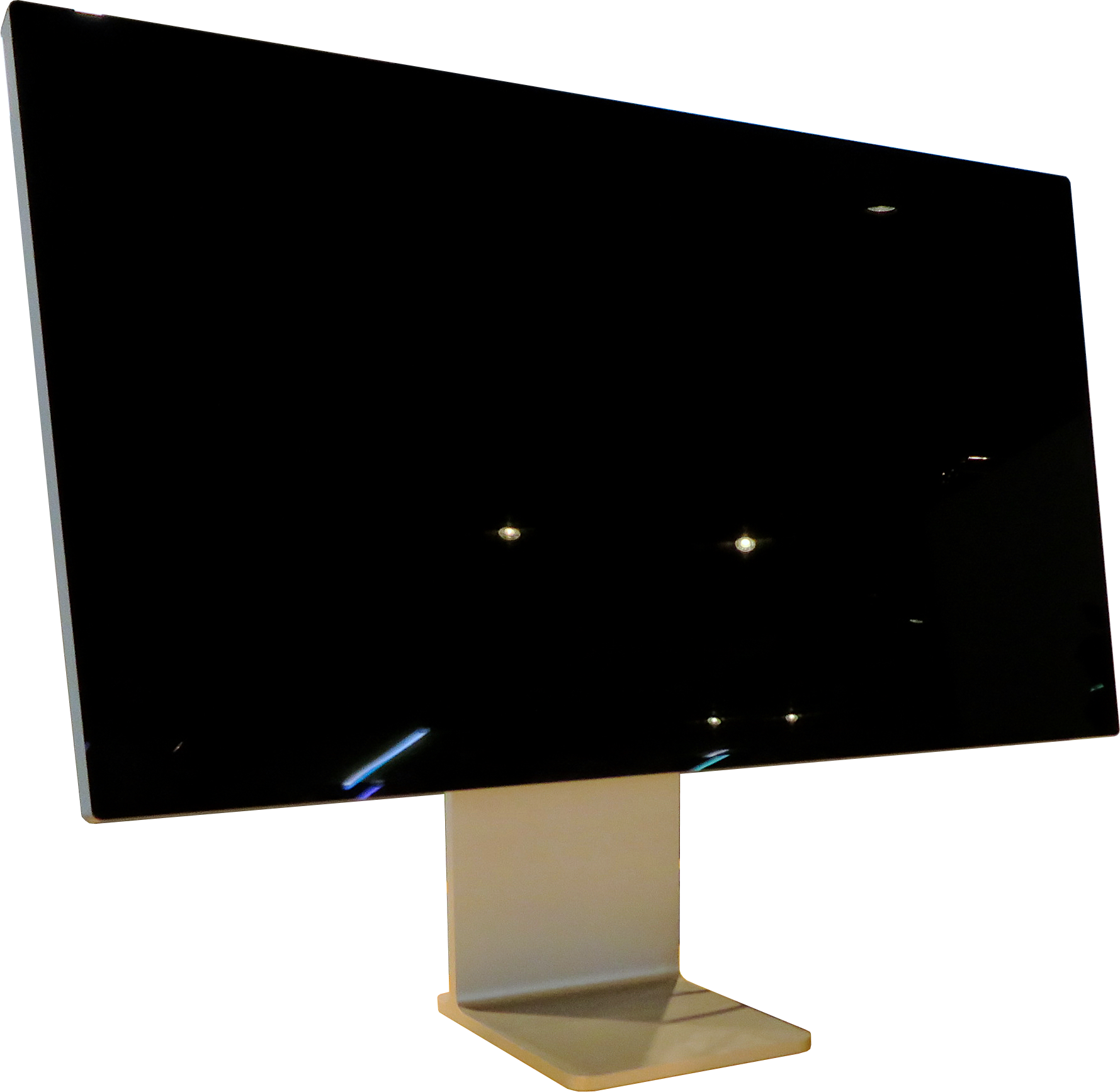
- Pro Display XDR with Pro Stand
- Developer: Apple Inc.
- Product family: Apple displays
- Type: Computer monitor
- Released: December 10, 2019; 6 years ago
- Introductory price: $4999 (standard glass) $5999 (nano-texture glass); Optional: Pro Stand: $999; VESA Mount Adapter: $199
- Discontinued: March 3, 2026
- Display: 31.6-inch 6016 × 3384 LED gloss-texture or nano-texture glass covered screen, 218 ppi pixel density
- Connectivity: Thunderbolt 3
- Power: Up to 100 W (standard glass); Up to 120 W (nano-texture glass)
- Current firmware: Pro Display XDR Firmware 4.2.37
- Dimensions: 16.2 in × 28.3 in × 1.1 in (41.2 cm × 71.8 cm × 2.7 cm) (display) 25.7 in (65.3 cm) – 21 in (53.3 cm) (height range in landscape mode) 31.7 in (80.6 cm) (height in portrait mode)
- Weight: 16.49 lb. (7.48 kg) (without stand); 26 lb. (11.8 kg) (with stand)
- Marketing target: Professional use
- Backward compatibility: iMac (2019 or newer); MacBook Air (2020 or newer); Mac Mini (2020 or newer); MacBook Pro 13-inch (2020 or newer, except May 2020 model with two Thunderbolt 3 ports); MacBook Pro 14-inch (all models); MacBook Pro 15-inch (2018 or newer); MacBook Pro 16-inch (all models); Mac Pro (2019 or newer); Mac Studio (all models); Intel-based Macs with Thunderbolt 3 paired with a Blackmagic eGPU or eGPU Pro or a Sonnet eGFX Breakaway Puck Radeon RX 5500 XT or 5700
- Model Number: A1999
- Predecessor: Apple Thunderbolt Display
- Successor: Apple Studio Display XDR
- Related: Apple Studio Display (1st generation)
- Website: Official website at the Wayback Machine (archived December 11, 2019)

The Pro Display XDR is a discontinued 32-inch flat panel computer monitor made by Apple, based on an LG supplied display, that was released on December 10, 2019. It was announced at the Apple Worldwide Developers Conference on June 3, 2019, along with the 2019 Mac Pro. It is the first Apple-branded display since the Apple Thunderbolt Display was discontinued in 2016. "XDR" stands for "Extreme Dynamic Range". The Pro Display XDR was discontinued in March 2026 and replaced by the smaller and cheaper 27-inch Studio Display XDR.

== Overview ==
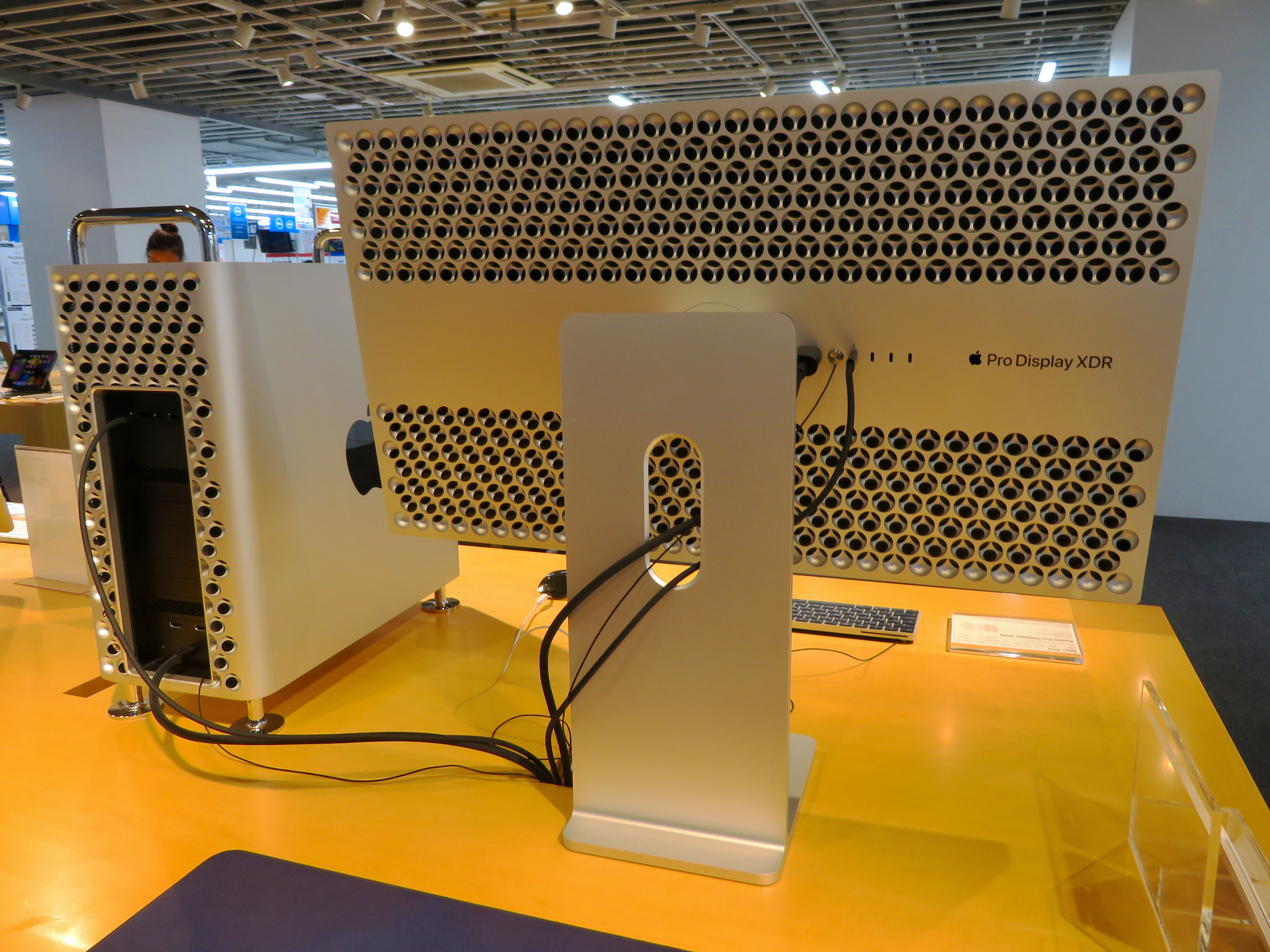
The back of the Pro Display XDR, connected to power and the Mac Pro via Thunderbolt 3 (USB-C)

The Pro Display XDR contains a 6016 × 3384 6K color-calibrated panel, and its rear cover contains a similar lattice pattern to the third-generation Mac Pro. To improve its contrast ratio and HDR capabilities, it uses blue-colored LEDs for its backlight instead of white, at a higher refresh rate than the display itself, and contains a system of "custom lenses and reflectors". The aforementioned lattice serves as a heatsink: Apple stated that this design gave the display sufficient thermal management to operate "indefinitely" at 1000 nits of brightness across the entire screen, and up to 1600 nits in an environment cooler than 25 °C (77 °F). The display is available with an optional laser-etched "nano-texture" glass finish to reduce glare. The nano-texture version requires a custom "dry polishing cloth" included with the display and sold by Apple to clean it.

Mounting options are optionally purchasable separately as an accessory, either the "VESA Mount Adapter" or "Pro Stand". Both use a proprietary magnet system to attach the display. The Pro Stand allows for height adjustment and rotation, and includes a lock switch that releases rotation when the display has enough clearance to rotate 90 degrees. The VESA Mount Mount Adapter allows one to use a VESA-mounted stand. Sensors in the display automatically rotate the user interface to portrait mode. Apple partnered with Logitech to create a 4K webcam that attaches to the top of the display magnetically.

VESA Mount Adapter for the display

== Compatibility ==
The Pro Display XDR runs at full resolution in high dynamic range with the following Macs running macOS Catalina 10.15.2 or later:

- iMac (2019 or newer)
- MacBook Air (2020 or newer)
- Mac Mini (2020 or newer)
- MacBook Pro 13-inch (2020 or newer, except May 2020 model with two Thunderbolt 3 ports)
- MacBook Pro 14-inch (2021 or newer, all models)
- MacBook Pro 15-inch (2018 or newer)
- MacBook Pro 16-inch (2019 or newer, all models)
- Mac Pro (2019 or newer)
- Mac Studio (2022 or newer, all models)
- Intel-based Macs with Thunderbolt 3 paired with a Blackmagic eGPU or eGPU Pro or a Sonnet eGFX Breakaway Puck RX 5500 XT or 5700

It is also compatible with iPads with an M-series chip:

- iPad Pro (fifth-generation and newer)
- iPad Air (fifth-generation and newer)

Other Macs and iPads with DisplayPort will output to it, including Thunderbolt 2-equipped Macs using an adapter, but are limited to lower resolutions and standard dynamic range. Windows and Linux-based systems supporting DisplayPort can output to it but lack configuration abilities like brightness control.

It provides up to 96 W of host charging for MacBooks. The rear USB-C ports require a Mac with an internal GPU supporting Display Stream Compression (2019 16-inch MacBook Pro, 2019 Mac Pro with W5700X, W6600X, W6800X, W6900X or W6800X Duo, 2020 27-inch iMac, and Macs with an M-series chip) to run at 3.0 speed, otherwise they will run at 2.0 speed.

== Reception ==
Shortly after the announcement, the stand came under criticism and mockery for being sold as a separate product, and at what was perceived to be an excessive cost for its function—retailing at $999. Gizmodo noted, "the price for Apple’s Pro Stand is so high, the crowd at WWDC 2019 let out an audible gasp when its pricing was announced, and that was in a room filled with reporters, Apple employees, Apple developers, and other assorted Apple followers who really ought to be immune to Apple sticker shock by now." The Verge jokingly dubbed the Pro Stand "the most expensive dongle ever".

== Technical specifications ==
Model	Pro Display XDR
Component	576 LED-backlit LCD
Release date(s)	December 10, 2019
Discontinuation date(s)	March 3, 2026
Model number(s)	A1999
Display	31.6 inches, TFT IPS active-matrix LCD, glossy glass or nano-texture glass covered screen, 6K (6016 × 3384) resolution, LED 576-zone full array local dimming backlight.
Display	16:9 aspect ratio (widescreen)
Pixel density	218 ppi
Response time	5 ms
Refresh rate	47.95 Hz (48000/1001), 48.00 Hz, 50.00 Hz, 59.94 Hz (60000/1001), 60.00 Hz
Colors	P3 wide color gamut, 10-bit depth for 1.073 billion colors (true 10-bit panel)
Contrast ratio	1,000,000:1
Brightness	1000 nits sustained (full screen), 1600 nits peak
Viewing angle	178° horizontal; 178° vertical
Power input	100-240 V AC @ 50–60 Hz
Material	Aluminium frame and glass front
Cables and peripheral connections	Cables: AC power cord; Peripheral connections: 3× powered USB-C ports for peripheral devices (USB 3.2 Gen 1 for Macs with a GPU supporting Display Stream Compression; otherwise USB 2.0); 1× 96 W powered Thunderbolt 3 (USB-C) port supporting DisplayPort 1.4 with Display Stream Compression (DSC) and Forward Error Correction (FEC)
Mounting	Pro Stand; VESA Mount Adapter
Dimensions	16.2 in × 28.3 in × 1.1 in (41.2 cm × 71.8 cm × 2.7 cm) (display); 25.7 in (65.3 cm) – 21 in (53.3 cm) (height range in landscape mode); 31.7 in (80.6 cm) (height in portrait mode)
Weight	16.49 lb. (7.48 kg) (without stand); 26 lb. (11.8 kg) (with stand)

== See also ==
- Apple displays
  - Apple Studio Display (1998–2004)
  - Apple Cinema Display (1999–2011)
  - Apple Thunderbolt Display (2011–2016)
  - Apple Studio Display (2022–present)
