= IPhone 17 =

2025 smartphone by Apple

iPhone 17

- iPhone 17 in Lavender
- Developer: Apple
- Manufacturers: Foxconn, Pegatron, Wistron
- Type: Smartphone
- Series: iPhone
- First released: September 19, 2025; 13 months ago
- Predecessor: iPhone 16 and 16 Plus
- Related: iPhone 17 Pro and 17 Pro Max iPhone Air iPhone 17e
- Compatible networks: 2G GSM/EDGE, 3G UMTS/HSPA+, 4G LTE, 5G NR/5G-A
- Form factor: Slate
- Colors: Lavender; Sage; Mist Blue; White; Black
- Dimensions: 149.6 × 71.5 × 7.95 mm (5.89 × 2.81 × 0.31 in)
- Weight: 177 g (6.2 oz)
- Operating system: Original: iOS 26; Current: iOS 27.2.1, released November 9, 2026
- System-on-chip: Apple A19
- Modem: Qualcomm Snapdragon X80
- Memory: 8 GB (LPDDR5X)
- Storage: 256 or 512 GB (NVMe)
- SIM: Dual eSIM: United States, Canada, Mexico, Bahrain, Kuwait, Oman, Qatar, Saudi Arabia, United Arab Emirates, Japan; Dual nano-SIM: China; nano-SIM and eSIM: elsewhere
- Battery: 14.351 Wh (3692 mAh) @ 3.887 V lithium-ion
- Charging: MagSafe and Qi 2 wireless; USB-C; Up to 50% in 20 minutes with 40+ W adapter
- Rear camera: Wide: 48 MP, f/1.6, 26 mm; Ultrawide: 48 MP, f/2.2, 13 mm
- Front camera: 18 MP, f/1.9, 23 mm
- Display: 6.3 in (160 mm) 2622 × 1206, 460 ppi, 120 Hz, LTPO Super Retina XDR OLED, HDR10, 3000 nits
- Sound: Stereo speakers, spatial audio
- Connectivity: Wi-Fi 7 (802.11a/b/g/n/ac/ax/be) tri-band Bluetooth 6.0 (A2DP, LE); Ultra-wideband (UWB); Thread; NFC (reader mode, Express Cards); USB-C: USB 2.0 480 Mbit/s; Dual-frequency GPS (L1, L5), GLONASS, Galileo, QZSS, BeiDou, NavIC
- Water resistance: IP68 dust/water resistant (up to 6 m for 30 min)
- Made in: China, India
- Other: Emergency SOS, Messages and Find My via satellite, FaceTime Audio or Video at 1080p over Wi-Fi and 5G, Voice over 5G Standalone (if supported by the carrier)
- Website: apple.com/iphone-17

The iPhone 17 is a smartphone developed and marketed by Apple that is part of the nineteenth generation of the iPhone. Succeeding the iPhone 16 series, the device was announced alongside the higher-priced, refreshed iPhone 17 Pro and 17 Pro Max and the iPhone Air during an Apple Event at Apple Park in Cupertino, California, on September 9, 2025.

== Overview ==
The iPhone 17 was announced alongside the higher-priced, refreshed iPhone 17 Pro and 17 Pro Max and the iPhone Air during an Apple Event at Apple Park in Cupertino, California, on September 9, 2025, and released on September 19. In a break with the iPhone Plus product line that had existed for the previous three generations, Apple did not unveil an iPhone 17 Plus. Its role in the product lineup was replaced by the new iPhone Air, which represented a strategic shift to a lighter, thinner product.

== Design ==
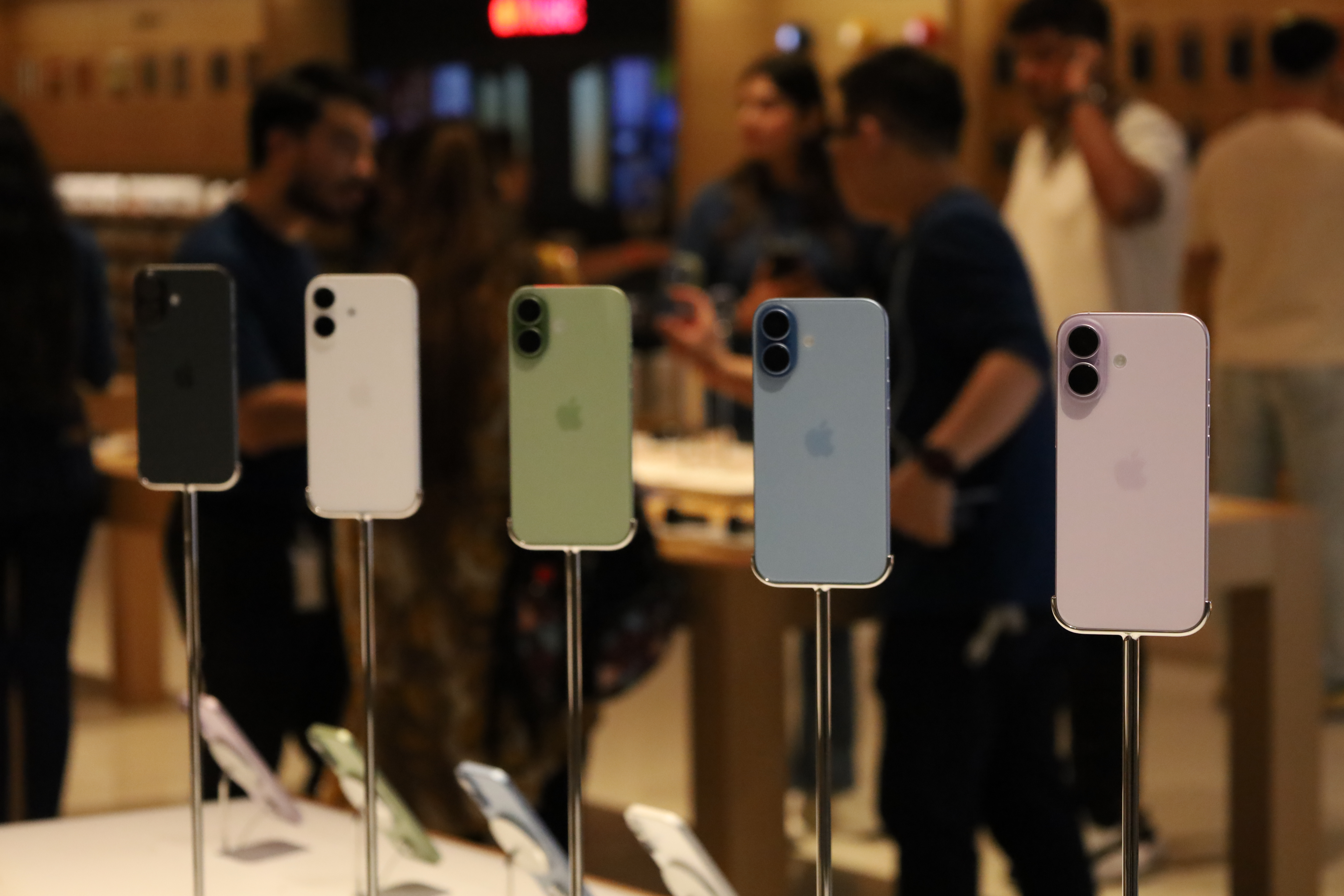
iPhone 17 phones in each different color

The iPhone 17 comes in five colors: Lavender, Sage, Mist Blue, White, and Black.

Compared to the previous model (the iPhone 16), the iPhone 17 uses the same design while improving internal hardware and shrinking the display bezels. Furthermore, the display is larger at 6.3 in (160 mm), compared to the previous model's 6.1 in (150 mm).

Color	Name
	Lavender
	Sage
	Mist Blue
	White
	Black

== Specifications ==
=== Chipset ===
The iPhone 17 uses the Apple A19 chip. It incorporates the Apple-designed N1 networking chip, part of a trend by Apple to reduce reliance on Broadcom and third-party chip suppliers. The N1 supports Wi-Fi 7, Bluetooth 6.0, and Thread. The iPhone 17 does not use Apple's new C1X modem found in the iPhone Air, opting instead for Qualcomm's Snapdragon X80. Apple said it intends to continue adoption of its own chips going forward, but that was not the focus for this year.

The iPhone 17 also removes the 128 GB storage option available on its predecessor, the iPhone 16, making the base model iPhone the first to come only with 256 GB and 512 GB of storage. At launch, prices started at US$799, before being raised to US$899 on September 9, 2026.

=== Display ===
The iPhone 17 has a 6.3-inch (160 mm) LTPO Super Retina XDR OLED display with a resolution of 2622 × 1206 at 460 pixels per inch. It supports a dynamic refresh rate of up to 120 Hz through ProMotion, the first time the technology was included on a non-Pro iPhone model. The display supports HDR10, always-on display, True Tone, P3 wide color, and Haptic Touch, and incorporates the Dynamic Island. It has a 2,000,000:1 contrast ratio. Its brightness ranges from 1 nit to 1,000 nits typical brightness, 1,600 nits peak brightness for HDR content, and 3,000 nits peak outdoor brightness. The display is protected by Ceramic Shield 2, which Apple claims provides three times the scratch resistance of the previous generation, and has fingerprint-resistant oleophobic and anti-reflective coatings.

=== Camera ===
The iPhone 17 uses a 48-megapixel Dual Fusion camera system, with a 48-megapixel Fusion main lens, and a 48 MP Fusion ultra-wide. This enables 12 MP shots with zoom up to 2x with optical quality using the main camera lens.

The front camera uses an 18 MP Center Stage camera with Dual Capture, which allows it to be used in any orientation and to create either a landscape or portrait photo, based on who is in the shot.

=== Security ===
Starting with all iPhone 17 models and iPhone Air, devices based on the A19 and A19 Pro include Memory Integrity Enforcement (MIE). MIE is an always-on, hardware-and-OS, memory-safety defense that uses Apple's secure memory allocators, Enhanced Memory Tagging Extension (EMTE) in synchronous mode, and Tag Confidentiality Enforcement policies. By default, MIE hardens key attack surfaces, including the kernel and over 70 userland processes, while preserving performance. Apple states that MIE targets mercenary spyware by making end-to-end exploit chains significantly more expensive and difficult to develop and maintain.

Comparison of iPhone 16 and iPhone 17 specifications
Feature	iPhone 16	iPhone 17
Display size	6.1-inch	6.3-inch
Display technology	60 Hz	ProMotion (120 Hz) with Always-On Display
Front glass	Ceramic Shield	Ceramic Shield 2
Processor	Apple A18	Apple A19
Front camera	12 MP TrueDepth	18 MP Center Stage
Ultrawide camera	12 MP	48 MP
Camera features	Standard capture	Tap to zoom and rotate, Center Stage for photos/video calls, Dual capture
Video stabilization	Cinematic video stabilization	Ultra-stabilized video
Battery life	Up to 22 hours video playback	Up to 30 hours video playback
Wireless charging	MagSafe (Up to 22W )	MagSafe (Up to 25W)

== Reception ==
IGN's Shubham Agarwal described the iPhone 17 as "Apple's best entry-level iPhone in years", praising the 120 Hz display and the faster 40 W charging for the first time in a non-Pro iPhone model, but criticizing its camera quality in low-light conditions. The A19 was praised for its performance in day-to-day use and multitasking, though IGN noted that "[g]aming performance isn’t as strong as the Pro's, and though it can smoothly run the majority of games on the App Store, some of the heavier ones, like Assassin's Creed Mirage, can stutter at the highest graphic settings."

== Release ==
Pre-orders for the iPhone 17 began on September 12, 2025, and they became available on September 19, 2025.

=== Availability by region ===
September 19, 2025

- Australia
- Austria
- Bahrain
- Brazil
- Belgium
- Bulgaria
- Canada
- China
- Colombia
- Croatia
- Czech Republic
- Denmark
- Finland
- France
- Germany
- Greece
- Hong Kong
- Hungary
- India
- Italy
- Ireland
- Japan
- Luxembourg
- Macao
- Malaysia
- Mexico
- Netherlands
- New Zealand
- Norway
- Oman
- Poland
- Portugal
- Qatar
- Romania
- Saudi Arabia
- Serbia
- Singapore
- Slovakia
- South Africa
- South Korea
- Spain
- Sweden
- Switzerland
- Taiwan
- Thailand
- Turkey
- United Arab Emirates
- United Kingdom
- United States
- Vietnam

October 12, 2025

- Bangladesh

October 17, 2025

- Indonesia
- Philippines

Preceded by iPhone 16 / 16 Plus	iPhone; 19th generation alongside iPhone Air and iPhone 17 Pro / 17 Pro Max	Succeeded by Most recent
