= IPhone 17 Pro =

2025 smartphone by Apple

iPhone 17 Pro iPhone 17 Pro Max

- iPhone 17 Pro in Cosmic Orange
- Developer: Apple
- Type: Smartphone
- Series: iPhone
- First released: September 19, 2025; 13 months ago
- Discontinued: September 9, 2026; 2 months ago
- Predecessor: iPhone 16 Pro and Pro Max
- Successor: iPhone 18 Pro and Pro Max
- Related: iPhone 17 iPhone Air iPhone 17e
- Compatible networks: 2G GSM/EDGE, 3G UMTS/HSPA+, 4G LTE, 5G NR/5G-A
- Form factor: Slate
- Colors: Cosmic Orange; Deep Blue; Silver
- Dimensions: Pro: 150.0 mm × 71.9 mm × 8.75 mm (5.91 in × 2.83 in × 0.34 in); Pro Max: 163.4 mm × 78.0 mm × 8.75 mm (6.43 in × 3.07 in × 0.34 in)
- Weight: Pro: 206 g (7.27 oz); Pro Max: 233 g (8.22 oz)
- Operating system: Original: iOS 26; Current: iOS 27.2.1, released November 9, 2026
- System-on-chip: Apple A19 Pro
- Modem: Qualcomm Snapdragon X80
- Memory: 12 GB LPDDR5X
- Storage: 256 GB; 512 GB; 1 TB; 2 TB (Pro Max only); NVMe
- SIM: Dual eSIM (US, Guam, US Virgin Islands, Canada, Mexico, Bahrain, Kuwait, Oman, Qatar, Saudi Arabia, United Arab Emirates, Japan); Dual nano-SIM (mainland China); nano-SIM and eSIM (elsewhere)
- Battery: Pro: 15.534 Wh (3988 mAh) @ 3.895 V (physical SIM) 16.558 Wh (4252 mAh) @ 3.894 V (eSIM); Pro Max: 18.748 Wh (4823 mAh) @ 3.887 V (physical SIM) 19.772 Wh (5088 mAh) @ 3.886 V (eSIM)
- Charging: MagSafe and Qi 2 wireless; USB-C fast-charge; Up to 50% charge in 20 minutes with 40 W adaptor or higher, provided via 15 V
- Rear camera: Fusion Main: 48 MP, f/1.78, 24 mm (wide); Fusion Ultrawide: 48 MP, f/2.2, 13 mm (ultrawide); Fusion Telephoto: 48 MP, f/2.8, 100 mm (periscope telephoto); TOF 3D LiDAR scanner; Dolby Vision; ProRes; ProRes RAW
- Front camera: 18 MP Center Stage camera, f/1.9, 23 mm (wide); Dolby Vision; ProRes; ProRes RAW
- Display: Pro: 6.3 in (160 mm) 2622 × 1206 pixel resolution at 460 ppi; Pro Max: 6.9 in (175 mm) 2868 × 1320 pixel resolution at 460 ppi; ProMotion technology with adaptive refresh rates up to 120 Hz; Always-On display at 1 Hz; Wide color gamut (P3); 2,000,000:1 contrast ratio (typical); 1,000 nits max brightness (typical); 1,600 nits peak brightness (HDR); 3,000 nits peak brightness (outdoor); 1 nit minimum brightness
- Sound: Stereo speakers, spatial audio
- Connectivity: Wi-Fi 7 tri-band, Bluetooth 6.0 (A2DP, LE), Ultra-wideband, Thread, NFC (reader mode, Express Cards), LEO satellite (Globalstar, limited), USB-C: USB 10Gbps, Dual-frequency GPS (L1, L5), GLONASS, Galileo, QZSS, BeiDou, NavIC
- Water resistance: IP68 dust and water resistant (up to 6 m for 30 minutes)
- Made in: China, India
- Other: Emergency SOS, Messages and Find My via satellite, FaceTime audio or video at 1080p over Wi-Fi and 5G, Voice over 5G Standalone (if supported by the carrier)
- Website: iPhone 17 Pro and iPhone 17 Pro Max at the Wayback Machine (archived September 9, 2026)

Alternative logo

The iPhone 17 Pro and iPhone 17 Pro Max are smartphones developed and marketed by Apple. Alongside the iPhone 17 and iPhone Air, they form the nineteenth generation of the iPhone, succeeding the iPhone 16 Pro and iPhone 16 Pro Max. The models were unveiled during the Apple Event at Apple Park in Cupertino, California, on September 9, 2025, and released on September 19, 2025. They were discontinued on September 9, 2026, following the announcement of the iPhone 18 Pro and iPhone 18 Pro Max.

== History ==
In August 2025, parts for the iPhone 17 Pro were leaked, which showcased an all-aluminum body, and internals for the iPhone 17 Pro Max. On August 26, 2025, Apple officially sent out invites for the next Apple Event set for September 9, 2025, with the tagline "Awe Dropping".

The iPhone 17 Pro and Pro Max were announced during that event with a new design, improvements to the battery and a larger rear camera plateau. Apple explained that the iPhone 17 Pro Max would offer the longest battery life in an iPhone at the time of launch, with up to 39 hours of video playback.

In November 2025, Apple used the song "Ok, Cool" (Saint Michael, 2023) by Trippie Redd for a commercial advertising the iPhone 17 Pro.

On July 4, 2026, the United States' 250th anniversary, an iPhone 17 Pro Max in Cosmic Orange was buried in a time capsule set to be opened in 2276 upon the United States' 500th anniversary.

== Design ==
Both iPhone 17 Pro models feature a new design over predecessor models. The sides of the phones are more rounded due to a single piece of aluminum connecting the back to the sides. A pane of glass is placed on the back of the phone to enable wireless charging. The models are offered in three colors: Cosmic Orange, Deep Blue, and Silver.

They are the first iPhone Pro models to feature an aluminum chassis rather than a titanium chassis (seen on iPhone 15 Pro, iPhone 16 Pro, and iPhone Air) or a stainless steel chassis (seen on all iPhone Pro models until iPhone 14 Pro). This change was made in response to overheating issues with the iPhone 15 Pro. The phones are also the first iPhone Pro models that are not offered in a neutral dark or black color.

The iPhone 17 Pro and iPhone 17 Pro Max are the last Pro-level iPhones to use the standard-sized Dynamic Island, which was first introduced with the iPhone 14 Pro and Pro Max, as the iPhone 18 Pro and Pro Max have a smaller Dynamic Island.

Color	Image	Name
		Cosmic Orange
		Deep Blue
		Silver

== Specifications ==
=== Chipset ===
The iPhone 17 Pro and Pro Max use the A19 Pro system on a chip. It incorporates the new Apple-designed N1 networking chip, part of the trend by Apple to reduce reliance on Broadcom. The Pro and Pro Max do not use Apple's new C1X modem found in the iPhone Air, opting instead for Qualcomm's Snapdragon X80. Apple said it intends to continue adoption of its own chips going forward, but that was not their focus for that year. The base iPhone 17 Pro comes with 12 GB of LPDDR5X RAM.

=== Display ===
The Pro has a 6.3-inch (160 mm) display (2622×1206 pixel resolution) and the Pro Max has a 6.9-inch (180 mm) display (2868×1320 pixel resolution). Excluding size, both displays are identical to the display on the standard iPhone 17 and supports up to 3,000 nits of brightness.

=== Camera ===
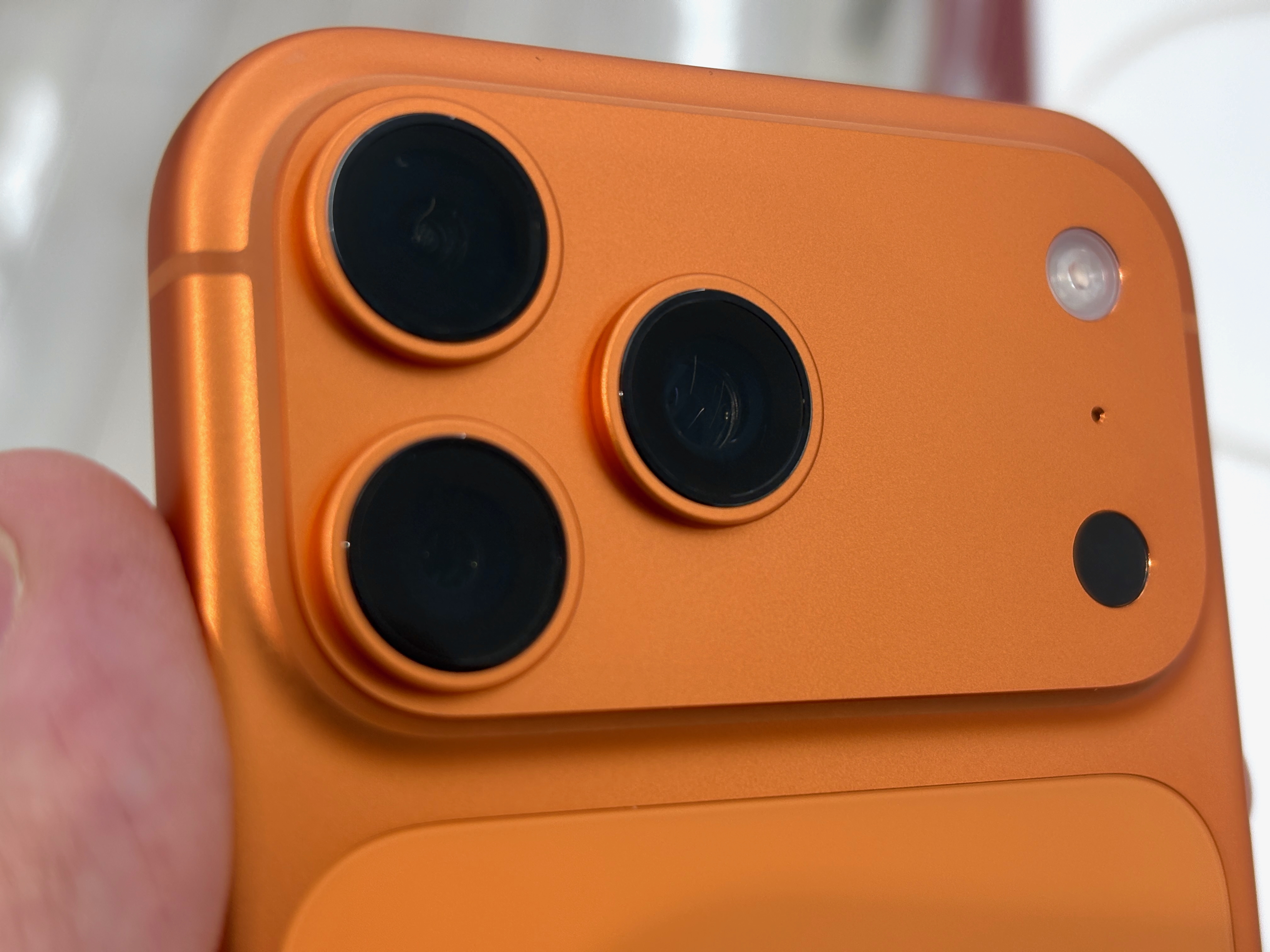
Detail of the "plateau camera"

The "plateau camera" was redesigned for the first time since the iPhone 11 Pro, featuring a large horizontal camera bump and a 4× telephoto "tetraprism" camera lens, instead of the previously used 5×. The new telephoto sensor is 48 MP, allowing for the use of sensor crop to emulate an optical-quality 8× zoom. The increase from 5× to 8× allows for smoother transitions from 1× to 8× zoom levels, and the higher quality sensor allows for optical-quality zoom without digitally cropping. However, the iPhone 17 Pro and Pro Max dropped support for night portrait mode, which was available from iPhone 12 Pro series to 16 Pro series.

The front camera uses a new 18 MP Center Stage camera with a unique square-shaped sensor, allowing the user to rotate the image taken without rotating the phone itself. The new Dual Capture feature allows the phone to take video with both the front and rear cameras at the same time.

=== Security ===
Starting with all iPhone 17 models and iPhone Air, devices based on the A19 and A19 Pro include Memory Integrity Enforcement (MIE). MIE is an always-on, hardware-and-OS, memory-safety defense that uses Apple's secure memory allocators, Enhanced Memory Tagging Extension (EMTE) in synchronous mode, and Tag Confidentiality Enforcement policies. By default, MIE hardens key attack surfaces including the kernel and over 70 userland processes while preserving performance. Apple states that MIE targets mercenary spyware by making end-to-end exploit chains significantly more expensive and difficult to develop and maintain.

=== Thermal system ===
The Pro models introduced a new vapor chamber cooling design. This chamber is built directly into a new aerospace-grade aluminum unibody frame. Apple claims that the chamber provides up to 40% better sustained performance compared to the iPhone 16 Pro by distributing heat more efficiently from the A19 Pro chip during intensive workloads like gaming and video editing. The chamber works by using "thin, hermetically sealed chambers with a drop of water inside that cycles between liquid and gas to help dissipate heat."

== Reception ==
=== Critical reviews ===
PCMag praised the iPhone 17 Pro in their review for its camera quality, increased screen brightness, performance, and build quality, while criticizing its high price and the absence of a 2 TB option, which is only available for the Pro Max version.

In The Guardian's review, the iPhone 17 Pro received praise for its "aluminum unibody design [which] feels nice, although it will scratch more easily than glass." The phone's screen, performance and battery life were also positively highlighted.

Jacqueline Thomas of IGN praised the iPhone 17 Pro Max's "excellent battery life" and described its screen as "one of the best displays on the market". In addition, the phone's "new aluminum chassis, along with its vapor chamber, keeps the phone relatively cool, which makes it a compelling gaming phone – even if it’s not the fastest one out there."

In a series of tests conducted by TechRadar, the iPhone 17 Pro was the fastest smartphone in both single- and multi-core CPU performance, beating the Samsung Galaxy S25 Ultra; however, the S25 Ultra sometimes beat the iPhone 17 Pro in GPU-related benchmarks.

=== Known issues ===
Some users reported that the colored aluminum body of their iPhone 17 Pro got scratches easily on the lip of the camera plateau, revealing the silver aluminum underneath; this phenomenon became known as "scratchgate".

== Use by NASA ==
iPhone 17 Pro Max video of Earth setting behind the Moon, taken from Artemis II

In February 2026, after extensive stress-testing, NASA cleared the use of the iPhone 17 Pro Max on its crewed missions, beginning with the Crew-12 mission to the International Space Station. With the Artemis II mission around the Moon in April 2026, the iPhone 17 Pro Max became the first smartphone to leave Earth orbit, capturing photos of the Earth and Moon from deep space.

== Release ==
Pre-orders for the iPhone 17 Pro and iPhone 17 Pro Max began on September 12, 2025, and they became available on September 19, 2025.

=== Availability by region ===
September 19, 2025

- Australia
- Austria
- Bahrain
- Brazil
- Belgium
- Bulgaria
- Canada
- China
- Colombia
- Croatia
- Czech Republic
- Denmark
- Finland
- France
- Germany
- Greece
- Hong Kong
- Hungary
- India
- Italy
- Ireland
- Japan
- Luxembourg
- Macao
- Malaysia
- Mexico
- Netherlands
- New Zealand
- Norway
- Oman
- Poland
- Portugal
- Qatar
- Romania
- Saudi Arabia
- Serbia
- Singapore
- Slovakia
- South Africa
- South Korea
- Spain
- Sweden
- Switzerland
- Taiwan
- Thailand
- Turkey
- United Arab Emirates
- United Kingdom
- United States
- Vietnam

October 12, 2025

- Bangladesh

October 17, 2025

- Indonesia
- Philippines

Preceded by iPhone 16 Pro / 16 Pro Max	iPhone; 19th generation alongside iPhone 17 and iPhone Air	Succeeded by iPhone 18 Pro / 18 Pro Max
