= Apple Display Connector =

Modified version of DVI video cable

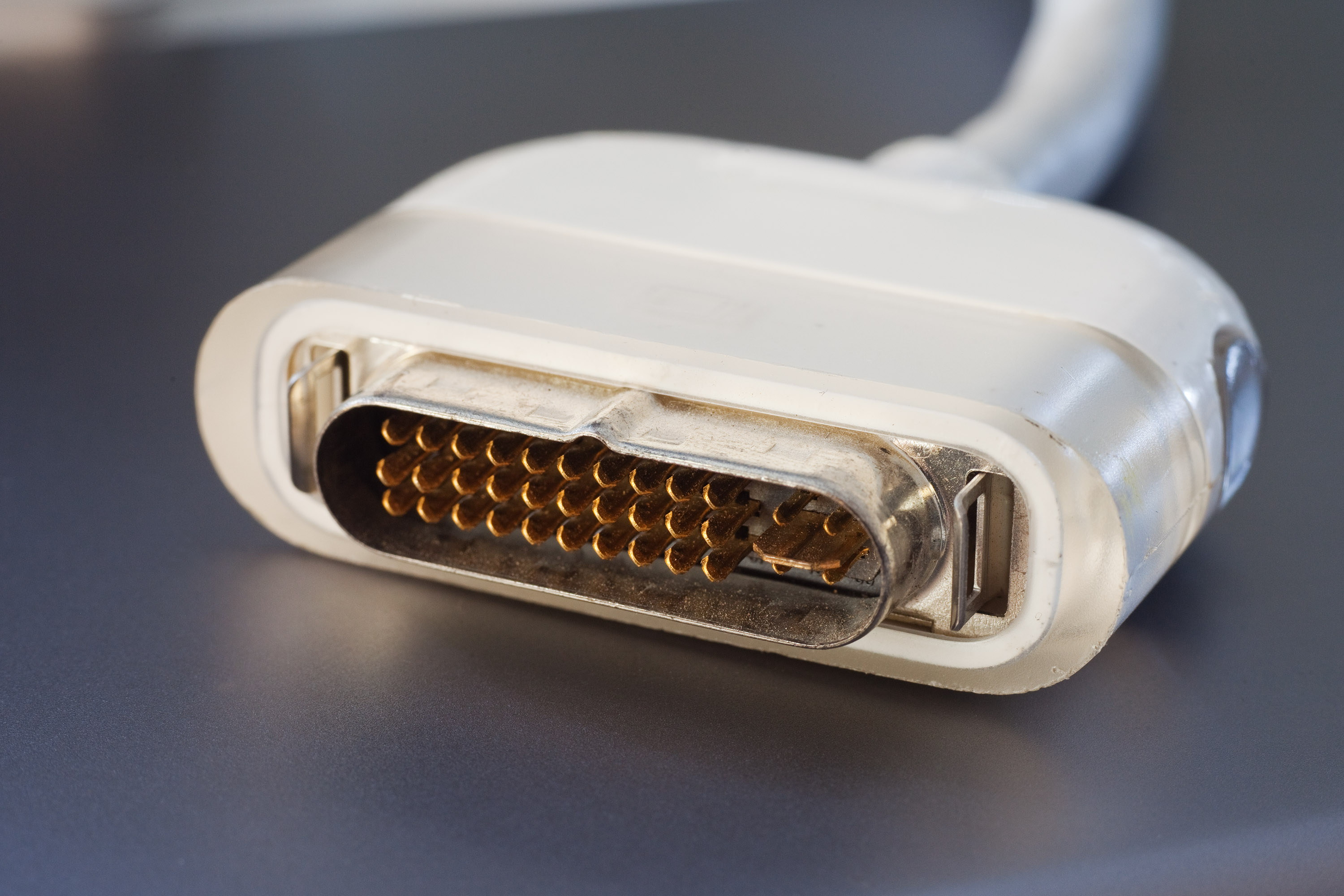
- ADC monitor connector
- Type: analog/digital video connector + USB

Production history
- Designer: Apple Computer
- Designed: 1998
- Manufacturer: Apple Computer
- Superseded: DB-15
- Superseded by: DVI (June 2004)

General specifications
- Hot pluggable: Yes
- External: Yes
- Pins: 35

Electrical
- Max. voltage: 25 V
- Max. current: 4.0 A

Pinout
- Receptacle (at host)
Pin 1	25 V Supply	power
Pin 2	25 V Supply	power
Pin 3	LED	data
Pin 4	TMDS Data0–	data
Pin 5	TMDS Data0+	data
Pin 6	TMDS Data0/5 Shield	data
Pin 7	TMDS Data5–	data
Pin 8	TMDS Data5+	data
Pin 9	DDC Data	data
Pin 10	Vsync	data
Pin 11	25 V Return	power
Pin 12	25 V Return	power
Pin 13	Soft Power	power
Pin 14	TMDS Data1–	data
Pin 15	TMDS Data1+	data
Pin 16	TMDS Data1/3 Shield	data
Pin 17	TMDS Data3–	data
Pin 18	TMDS Data3+	data
Pin 19	DDC CLock	data
Pin 20	Clock Return	data
Pin 21	USB Data+	data
Pin 22	USB Data–	data
Pin 23	USB Return	data
Pin 24	TMDS Data2–	data
Pin 25	TMDS Data2+	data
Pin 26	TMDS Data2/4 Shield	data
Pin 27	TMDS Data4–	data
Pin 28	TMDS Data4+	data
Pin 29	Clock+	data
Pin 30	Clock-	data
C1	data	Analog Blue Video
C2	data	Analog Green Video
C3	data	Analog Horizontal Sync
C4	data	Analog Red Video
C5	data	Analog RGB Return and DDC Return

The Apple Display Connector (ADC) is a display and data connector developed by Apple Inc. as a proprietary modification of the DVI connector. ADC combines analog and digital video signals, USB, and power all in one cable. It was used in later versions of the Apple Studio Display, including the final 17" CRT model, and most versions of the widescreen Apple Cinema Display, after which Apple adopted standard DVI connectors on later models.

ADC was first implemented in the July 2000 Power Mac G4 and G4 Cube, but disappeared from displays when Apple introduced the aluminum-clad 20" (51 cm), 23" (58 cm), and 30" (76 cm) Apple Cinema Displays in June 2004, which feature separate DVI, USB and FireWire connectors, and their own power supplies. An ADC port was still included with the Power Mac G5 until April 2005, when new models meant the only remaining Apple product with an ADC interface was the single processor Power Mac G5 introduced in October 2004. This single processor Power Mac G5 was discontinued soon after in June 2005.

== Compatibility ==
The Apple Display Connector is physically incompatible with a standard DVI connector. The Apple DVI to ADC Adapter, which cost $149US at launch but was in 2002 available for $99US, takes USB and DVI connections from the computer, adds power from its own integrated power supply, and combines them into an ADC output, allowing ADC monitors to be used with DVI-based machines.

On some models of Power Mac G4 the ADC connector replaced the DVI connector. This change necessitated a passive ADC to DVI adapter to use a DVI monitor.

The ADC carries up to 100 W of power, an insufficient amount to run most 19-inch (48 cm) or bigger CRTs widely available during ADC's debut, nor can it run contemporary flat panels marketed for home entertainment (many of which support DVI or VGA connections) without an adapter. The power limit was an important factor for Apple to abandon ADC when it launched the 30-inch (76 cm) Apple Cinema HD Display.

On newer DVI-based displays lacking ADC, Apple still opted for a single "ganged cable" that connects the separate signal cables to each other so they cannot tangle. Such cables, however, employ standard DVI, power, USB and FireWire connectors, avoiding drawbacks to ADC. Beginning in 2008, Apple began transitioning away from DVI, adopting the increasingly common DisplayPort signalling standard, and developed their own Mini DisplayPort connector beginning with the first LED-backlit Cinema Displays. As of 2013, Apple no longer uses a DVI-based interface for any of its displays.

Apple no longer supports ADC adapters or monitors.

== Pin 3 and 11 ==
Power is supplied to the ADC port by an additional finger connector on the video card, which plugs into a slot on the motherboard between the AGP slot and the back panel of the computer; on G4 Macs, some power is also sent through AGP pins 3 and 11. When ADC was introduced, AGP pins 3 and 11 were unassigned. In AGP 8x, pins 3 and 11 were assigned, so because of that, G4s are not directly compatible with AGP 8x. G5 Macs draw all power from the finger connector and therefore are 8x compatible. To use an AGP 8x card in a G4, pins 3 and 11 must be somehow disabled; this can be done by placing tape over the conductive part of the pin, slicing the PCB traces, or on some cards, desoldering surface mount resistors.

== See also ==
- Apple Displays
- HDI-45 connector (a previous attempt by Apple to integrate other interfaces into a video connector)
- List of display interfaces
