= IPhone Plus =

iPhone Plus may refer to:

- iPhone 6 Plus, released in 2014
- iPhone 6s Plus, released in 2015
- iPhone 7 Plus, released in 2016
- iPhone 8 Plus, released in 2017
- iPhone 14 Plus, released in 2022
- iPhone 15 Plus, released in 2023
- iPhone 16 Plus, released in 2024
