= Apple Cinema Display =

Series of computer monitors sold by Apple Inc.

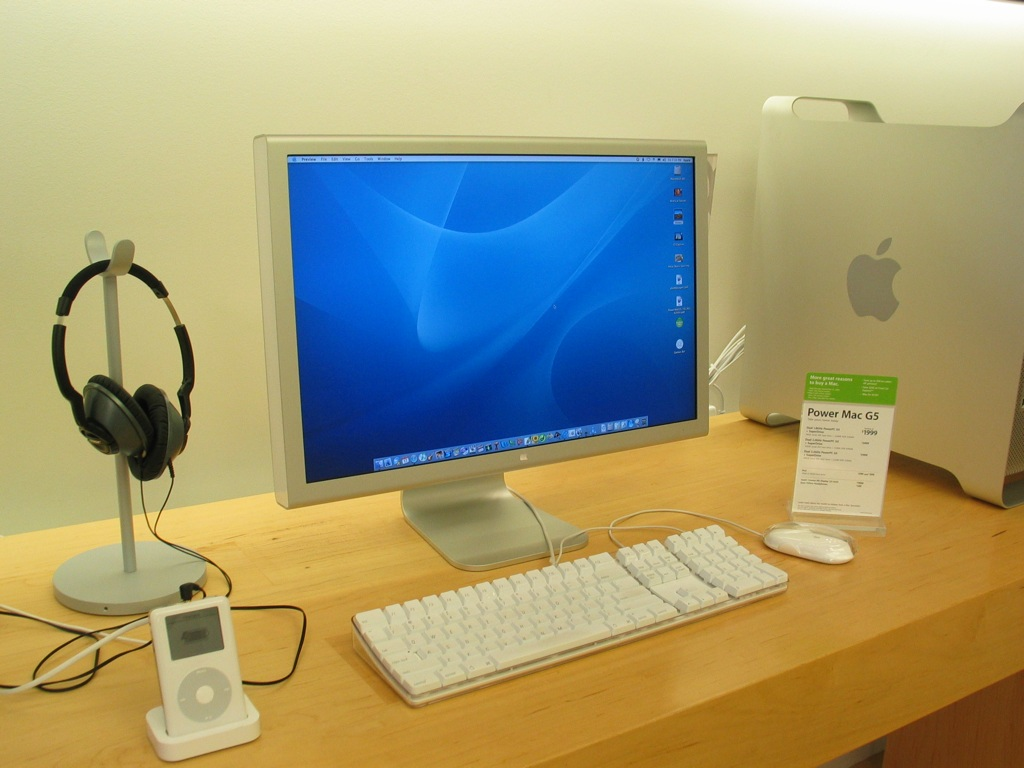
- An aluminum model Apple Cinema Display connected to a Power Mac G5, as seen with a 4th generation iPod Classic
- Developer: Apple Inc.
- Type: Computer monitor
- Released: September 1, 1999; 27 years ago
- Discontinued: July 20, 2011
- Predecessor: Apple Studio Display (1998–2004)
- Successor: Apple Thunderbolt Display
- Website: Official website at the Wayback Machine (archived January 3, 2010)

The Apple Cinema Display is a discontinued line of flat-panel computer monitors developed and sold by Apple Inc. between 1999 and 2011. It was initially sold alongside the older line of Studio Displays, but eventually replaced them. Apple offered 20, 22, 23, 24, 27, and 30-inch sizes, with the last model being a 27-inch size with LED backlighting.

The Cinema Display line had three distinct design languages during its lifetime, the first featuring transparent polycarbonate plastic, and the later two featuring anodized aluminum. The first displays were designed to match the colorful plastic of the Power Mac G3 and later the Power Mac G4, while the second revisions were designed to match the aluminum aesthetics of the Power Mac G5 and PowerBook G4. The last available design matched the unibody laptops released in October 2008, and had a glossy screen.

The Apple Cinema Display name was retired in July 2011 with the introduction of the Apple Thunderbolt Display. Cinema Display models were no longer offered on the Apple Store website as of August 2014.

== Models ==
=== Cinema Display ===
The first model—the 22-inch Apple Cinema Display—was introduced in September 1999 alongside the Power Mac G4 and used DVI for video input. It was enclosed in a high-density plastic frame with an easel-style stand and had a display resolution of 1600×1024.

The 22-inch model was upgraded in July 2000 with the Apple Display Connector (ADC), which ran DVI, USB, and 28V power through a single connector. It did not require an external power brick when it was connected to a computer with an ADC port on it.

It was eventually replaced by a 20-inch model on January 28, 2003, that also used an ADC connector and sported a widescreen display with up to 1680×1050 resolution and a brightness of 230 cd/m^{2}.

The 20-inch Cinema Display was updated again June 28, 2004 to match the aluminum design of the new Cinema HD Display. It retained the 1680x1050 resolution of the previous model but saw its brightness increased to 250 cd/m^{2}, and was introduced at a $1,299 price point. Apple continued to sell this display with no further changes until October 2008.

=== Cinema HD Display ===
The 23-inch model, dubbed the "Cinema HD Display," was introduced on March 21, 2002, and supported full 1:1 1080p playback on a 1920x1200 pixel display.

On June 28, 2004, Apple introduced a redesigned line of Cinema Displays, along with a new 30-inch model that, like the 23-inch model, carried the "Cinema HD Display" name. The new models had an anodized aluminum enclosure that matched Apple's high-end lines of professional products. An alternative stand or a wall mount could be used with a VESA mount adapter kit that was sold separately. Though the display enclosures had not been redesigned for a long period of time, several "silent" improvements were made to the brightness levels and contrast ratios.

==== 30-inch model compatibility ====
Due to the high resolution (2560×1600), the 30-inch model requires a graphics card that supports dual-link DVI. When the monitor was released, no Macintosh models were sold with a dual-link DVI port. A Power Mac G5 with the new Nvidia GeForce 6800 Ultra DDL graphics card was initially required to run the display at full resolution.

All Power Mac G5, PowerBook G4, and Mac Pro mid 2006 to mid 2010 models are capable of supporting it without the use of any adapters. Discrete MacBook Pros are also capable of driving the 30-inch display, while all Macs released after October 2008 require an additional adapter. The 30-inch Cinema Display was introduced together with the GeForce 6800, which supports two DVI-DL ports. ATI's aftermarket AGP X800 Mac Edition also supports dual-link DVI, but has only one port. The Radeon 9600 Mac/PC was another aftermarket graphics card that supported dual-link DVI and was also compatible with older AGP-based Power Macs.

If a computer with a single-link DVI port (such as a Mac laptop with a mini-DVI connector) is connected to the 30-inch display, it will only run at 1280×800, even if the computer is capable of supporting 1920×1200 over a single-link connection.

=== LED Cinema Display ===
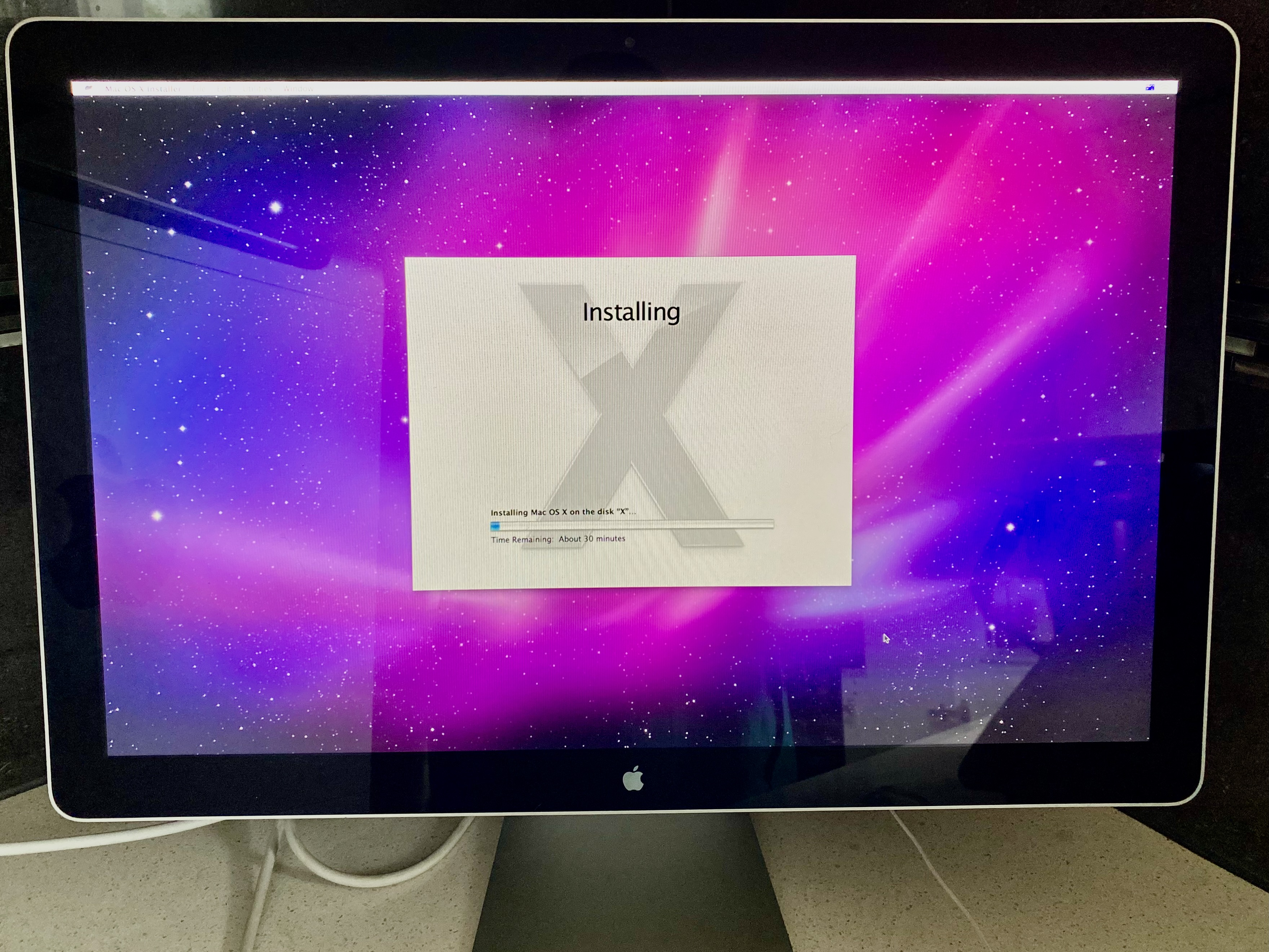
A 24 inch LED Cinema Display showing the installation of Mac OS X Snow Leopard

On October 14, 2008, the 20-inch Cinema Display and the 23-inch Cinema HD Display were discontinued and replaced with the 24-inch LED Cinema Display. Its chassis is made with aluminum and glass, reflecting the appearances of the current iMac, unibody MacBook Pro, and unibody MacBook designs. The display features a built-in iSight camera, microphone and dual speaker system. A MagSafe cable runs from the back of the display and provides 85W of charging for MacBooks. It is the first Cinema Display to use LED backlighting and Mini DisplayPort for video input; however, the LED backlighting is edge-lit as opposed to the fully back-lit CCFL of the previous models, resulting in a lower brightness cd/m^{2} output.

The 24-inch LED Cinema Display is only officially compatible with Macs that have a Mini DisplayPort port. A third-party converter must be used in order to use the display with older Macs.

Newer MacBooks that only have USB-C (or Thunderbolt 3) ports can connect to the 24-inch LED Cinema Display using a USB-C to Mini DisplayPort adapter. However, Apple's Thunderbolt 3 to Thunderbolt 2 adapter cannot be used even though it has the same physical connections. Due to differences in the electrical signaling of Thunderbolt 2 and Mini DisplayPort, a generic USB-C to Mini DisplayPort adapter must be used instead.

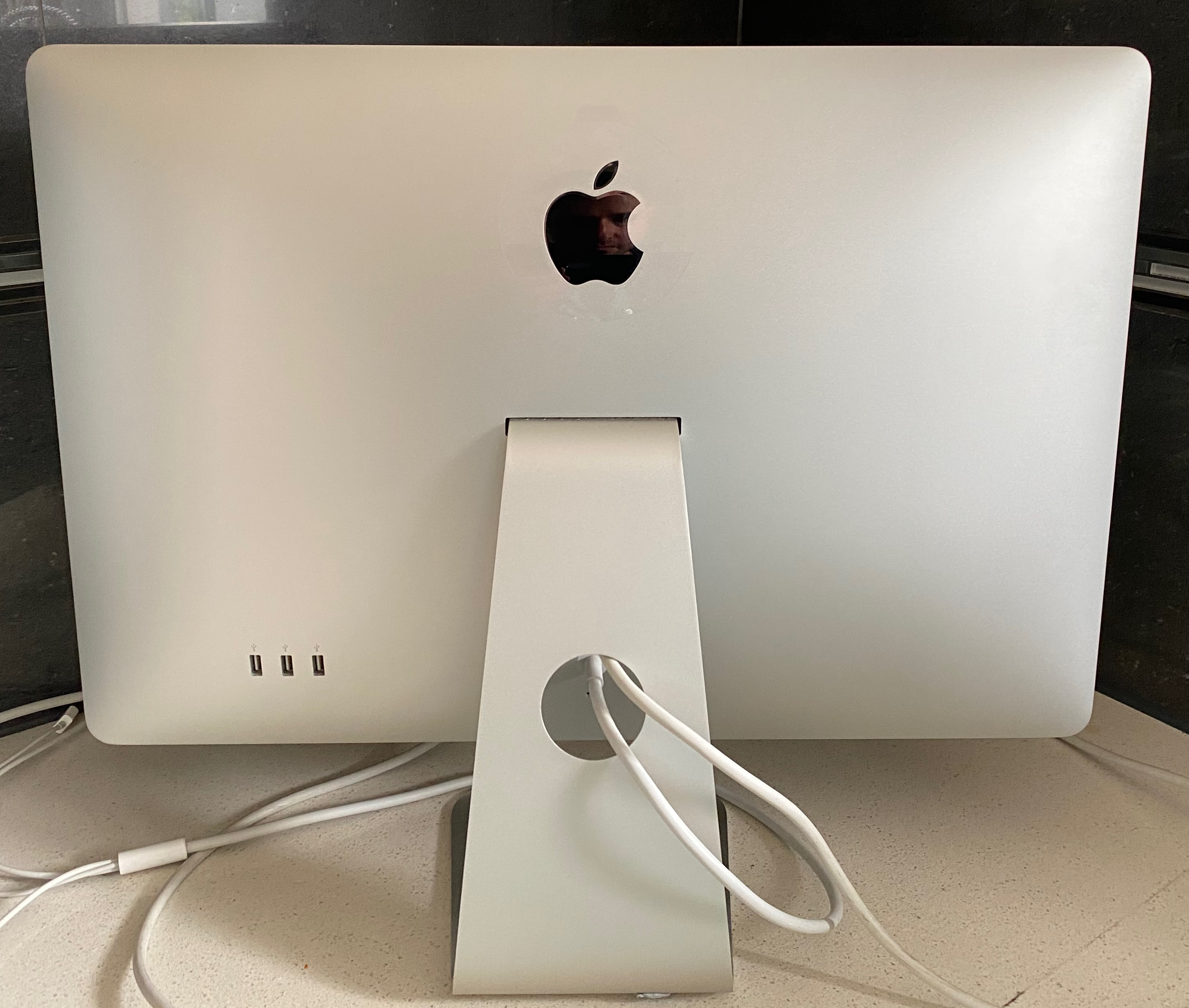
Rear of monitor showing USB hub ports

With the introduction of LED panels, the matte, anti-glare screen panels were retired, except for the 30-inch Cinema Display. Apple had already moved away from matte screens in its line of iMac desktop computers on August 7, 2007. Apple had not offered any equipment with a matte, anti-glare screen after the 15-inch non-Retina MacBook Pro was discontinued in October 2013 until the introduction of the Pro Display XDR in 2019. This had been a cause for concern among users who wanted matte screens for their area of work, particularly graphic designers, photographers and users who extensively view their screens. Matte screens, like matte-surface photographs, diffuse reflected light and cannot provide the same black levels as glossy screens, which are required for working with HDR images and videos and thus are disadvantaged in this area. However, the matte screens have a far lower level of reflectivity, which improves ease-of-use.

The Wall Street Journal referred to Apple's removal of the matte screen as one of their worst design decisions.

On July 26, 2010, the 24-inch LED Cinema Display and the 30-inch Cinema HD Display were replaced by a 27-inch model that supports up to 2560×1440 resolution. This model was sold for $999.

On July 20, 2011, the LED Cinema Display was discontinued and replaced by the Apple Thunderbolt Display.

== Technical specifications ==
=== LCD models ===
Table of models
Component	LCD						
Model	Apple Cinema Display		Apple Cinema HD Display	Apple Cinema Display		Apple Cinema HD Display	
Model number	M5662	M8149	M8536	A1038	A1081	A1082	A1083
Order number	M7478LL/A (North America) M7478ZM/A (international)	M8058LL/A (North America) M8058ZM/A (international)	M8537LL/A (North America) M8537ZM/A (international)	M8893LL/A (North America) M8893ZM/A (international)	M9177LL/A (North America) M9177ZM/A (international)	M9178LL/A (North America) M9178ZM/A (international)	M9179LL/A (North America) M9179ZM/A (international)
Release date(s)	September 1, 1999	July 19, 2000	March 21, 2002	January 28, 2003	June 28, 2004		
Discontinued date	July 19, 2000	January 28, 2003	June 28, 2004		October 14, 2008		July 26, 2010
Display (all 16:10 and matte)	22" 1600 × 1024 (fullscreen)		23" 1920 × 1200	20" 1680 × 1050		23" 1920 × 1200	30" 2560 × 1600
Pixel density (in pixels per inch)	86.35		98.4				101.6
Brightness	180 cd/m^{2}		200 cd/m^{2}	230 cd/m^{2}	250 (or 300*) cd/m^{2}	270 (or 400*) cd/m^{2}	270 (or 400*) cd/m^{2}
Contrast ratio	300:1		350:1		400:1 (or 700:1*)		
Response time	Unknown		16 ms				
Power	62–77 W	35–77 W	70 W	60 W	65 W	90 W	150 W
Material	Polycarbonate frame				Aluminum frame		
Input	DVI-D	Apple Display Connector			DVI-D		Dual-link DVI-D
Output	2x USB 1 ports				2 FireWire 400 ports and 2 USB 2.0 ports		

- On August 7, 2006 the Aluminium Cinema displays had a silent upgrade that boosted the brightness and contrast ratios to 300/400 cd/m^{2} and 700:1. The last Cinema Displays are still desirable to professionals being the last anti-glare displays made by Apple (until the Pro Display XDR) and having a true IPS 8-bit (no dithering) fully back-lit panel and slightly higher brightness than that of the newer Apple Thunderbolt displays, which have a reflective glossy screen and an edge-lit panel. These displays (including the LED Cinema 24”) are the last Apple desktop monitors made in 16:10 aspect ratio that is also used on MacBook Pros and provides more vertical work space.

=== LED-backlit LCD models ===
Table of models
Component	LED-backlit LCD	
Model	LED Cinema Display (24")	LED Cinema Display (27")
Model number	A1267	A1316
Order number	MB382LL/A	MC007LL/A
Release date	October 14, 2008	July 26, 2010
Discontinued date	July 26, 2010	December 2, 2013
Display (all widescreen)	24", glossy glass covered screen, LCD, 1920 × 1200	27", glossy glass covered screen, LCD, 2560 × 1440
Display (all widescreen)	16:10 aspect ratio	16:9 aspect ratio
Built-in camera	iSight 640 x 480	
Brightness	330 cd/m^{2}	375 cd/m^{2}
Colors	16.7 million (maximum) True Color	
Pixel density (in pixels per inch)	94.3	109
Response time	13 ms	
Power	Up to 212 W (while charging a MacBook Pro)	Up to 250 W (while charging a MacBook Pro)
Material	Aluminum frame and glass front	
Cables and peripheral connections	Cables: Single cable with three connectors: Mini DisplayPort with audio support; MagSafe (up to 85W); USB 2.0; AC power cord; Peripheral connections: 3× powered USB 2.0 ports	
Original price	US$899	US$999
