= Always-on display =

Smartphone feature

An always-on display (AOD) is a computer-device feed feature mostly found on smartphones that has the device display show limited information while the phone is asleep. It is widely available on Android handsets and is available on iPhone Pro models since the iPhone 14 Pro and on non-Pro models starting with the iPhone 17. On some Android devices, the feature is called Ambient Display (Google Pixel) or Active Display, depending on its implementation and behavior. Depending on the phone's design, it may be a replacement or complementary to another feature, such as the notification LED.

== Overview ==
A device with AOD enabled keeps a limited portion of the screen on during sleep mode. An Always-On Display may display a set of recent push notifications in place of a notification tone or LED signal, as well as information such as the time, date, and battery status of the device; they often may also be configured to also show various types of notifications as they arrive, or screensavers.

Various devices have differing behavior for this feature. Some phones would have the screen off until new notifications arrive where upon the display would either be active for a few seconds or remain on until the user interacts with the device to dismiss the notification (essentially having the entire screen serve as a larger notification LED); others instead have the phone screen activate when it detects input, such as being picked up or the screen interacted with. These versions are often called ambient displays, in contrast to "true" always-on displays, where at least part of the screen remains on at all times. Again, depending on the manufacturer, not all apps may be supported for showing notifications with this feature - only first-party apps or popular apps may be supported.

== History ==
This technology was first introduced by Nokia in on the Nokia N70 and Nokia 6303 (on TFT display in 2008), and more widely adopted with its next generation AMOLED Symbian phones in 2010 (the Nokia N8, C7, C6-01 and E7). Later functionality was updated with Nokia Sleeping Screen app for last generation of Symbian smartphones (Nokia 808 and other) with features like custom standby screen from any image, and two themes for and 4 themes notifications design. It became a standard feature on most Nokia Lumia Windows Phones in 2013, paired with the Nokia Glance Screen app. The feature has since become more widely available on Android handsets. Apple has the feature since Apple Watch Series 5 (2019) and on iPhone 14 Pro in 2022.

== Battery impact ==
Enabling the Always-On Display feature increases energy consumption, although the Samsung Galaxy S7 and later phones that made the feature popular are built with AMOLED screens in which no power is needed for black pixels. On today's AMOLED phone displays, it is true that only a few pixels may need to be turned on but they do need to be moved to prevent screen burn-in. Assuming that AOD is in use 30% of the time per day, AOD can lead to an extra battery consumption of roughly 3%.

On LCD displays, the backlight has to be turned on, even if only a part of the screen is showing information, so this feature consumes a significant amount of power compared to a notification LED. Some LCD displays use a transflective LCD. It uses a layer called a transflector, typically made from a sheet polymer. It is similar to a one-way mirror but is not specular. Some smartwatches such as the Pebble Smartwatch and the Amazfit Stratos also use this technology. Under bright illumination (e.g. when exposed to daylight) the display acts mainly as a reflective display with the contrast being constant with illuminance.

Typically, an ambient display solution which turns on the screen only when notifications are present, but turns off when they are dismissed, will consume the least amount of battery power while still drawing the user's attention when required. This is in contrast to an Always-on Display which will keep the screen on all of the time, even if notifications may not be present. Since the date and time are less essential than battery status or notifications which may require the user's immediate attention, an AOD can be customized in many app-based implementations to only show notifications or selectively choose what is shown.

== Scheduled on/off times ==
In some phones, the Always-On Display/Ambient Display feature can be toggled on a schedule, such as during nighttime, or when the proximity sensor detects that the device is in a pocket. There may be an option for the phone to keep the screen on only when there are notifications to be acknowledged or dismissed by the user.
