= Apple Studio Display =

Apple Studio Display may refer to:

- Apple Studio Display (1998–2004)
- Apple Studio Display (2022–present)
