= Developer Transition Kit =

Series of prototype Mac computers

The Developer Transition Kit (DTK) refers to two prototype Mac computers made available to software developers by Apple. The first DTK was released in 2005 before the Mac transition to Intel processors to assist developers during the transition from PowerPC processors to Intel x86-64 processors. A second DTK was released in 2020 before the Mac transition to Apple silicon as part of Apple's transition from Intel processors to its Apple silicon platform based on the ARM64 architecture.

== Intel (2005) ==
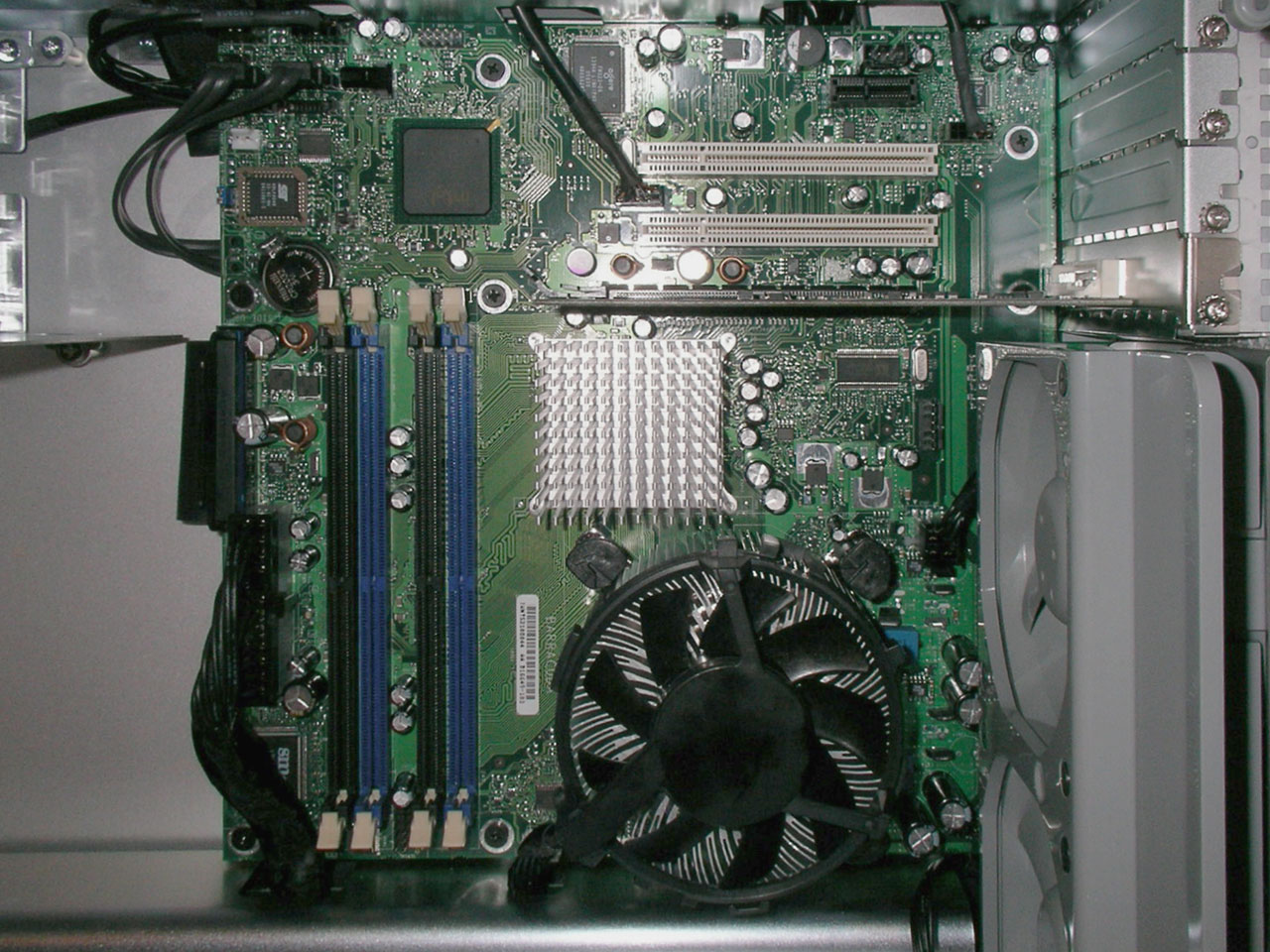
Intel DTK logic board

During the Mac transition to Intel processors, Apple provided software developers with an Intel-based DTK. At the 2005 Worldwide Developers Conference, then-CEO Steve Jobs described the hardware as a non-commercial: "This is a development platform only. This is not a product; this will never be shipped as a product. It's just for you guys to get started in development. You actually have to return them by the end of 2006. We don't want them floating around out there. These are not products."

The DTK identified itself as "Apple Development Platform" and contained a 3.6 GHz Intel Pentium 4 Prescott 2M 660 processor, 1 GB of DDR2 SDRAM, a 160 GB SATA hard drive, and an optical disc drive. Its components were housed in a modified Power Mac G5 enclosure with changes to the cooling system. Connectivity included USB 2.0, FireWire 400, and Gigabit Ethernet. The DTK included Xcode 2.1 and a version of Mac OS X 10.4.1 which runs on Intel's x86 architecture.

The Intel DTK was provided to software developers through a loan program. Developers were required to return the prototype computers to Apple by the end of 2006. Eligibility required membership in Apple's Select or Premier Apple Developer Connection program, with membership fees starting at US$499 (equivalent to $820 in 2025) per year and an additional US$999 (equivalent to $1,650 in 2025) payment for the DTK. Apple later offered developers a free Intel-based iMac in exchange for returning the DTK.

== Apple Silicon (2020) ==
The Apple Silicon DTK was housed in the same enclosure as the unibody Mac mini

At the Worldwide Developers Conference on June 22, 2020, Apple announced a second DTK to assist software developers during the Mac transition to Apple silicon.

Informally described as "an iPad in a Mac mini's body," the DTK identified itself as "Apple Development Platform". It included an Apple A12Z Bionic processor, 16 GB of RAM, a 512 GB solid-state drive, and ports for USB-C, USB-A, HDMI 2.0, and Gigabit Ethernet in an enclosure based on the unibody Mac mini. It supported Wi-Fi 5 (802.11ac) and Bluetooth 5.0. Unlike commercially available Macs at the time, it did not support Thunderbolt 3.

In an interview following the announcement, Apple's senior vice president of Software Engineering, Craig Federighi, said the DTK used the A12Z chip from the iPad Pro rather than a processor intended for future Mac products: "Even that DTK hardware, which is running on an existing iPad chip that we don't intend to put in a Mac in the future, it's just there for the transition, the Mac runs awfully nice on that system. It's not a basis on which to judge future Macs, but it gives you a sense of what our silicon team can do when they're not even trying, and they're going to be trying."

To receive a DTK, developers enrolled in Apple's Universal App Quick Start Program, which cost US$500 (equivalent to $620 in 2025) for a one-year membership. Membership included technical support and the use of a DTK loaned by Apple.

The DTK was required to be returned to Apple one year after enrollment, or earlier if requested by Apple. The terms of use prohibited actions including disassembling the DTK, running unauthorized benchmark tests, and using it for purposes unrelated to software development for the Apple silicon transition.

In February 2021, Apple informed developers that it was requesting the return of DTKs by March 31, 2021, before the end of the one-year program period, while allowing other program benefits to continue until their original expiration dates. Apple also provided a US$200 (equivalent to $240 in 2025) discount code toward the purchase of an M1 Mac before May 2021 after the DTK was returned.

Some developers criticized Apple's decision, saying they needed more time as the DTK had more issues than expected, making it "unusable" in development. Developers also criticized the value of the discount compared with the earlier Intel transition program.

On February 5, 2021, Apple increased the discount code to the full $500 of the program membership, expanded its use to other Apple products, and extended its expiration date through the end of 2021.

== Specifications ==
Model	Intel (2005)	Apple Silicon (2020)
Introduction	June 6, 2005	June 22, 2020
Model identifiers	MA022xx/A; ADP2,1	MYAL2xx/A; ADP3,2; A2330
Processor	3.6 GHz single-core Intel Pentium 4 Prescott 2M 660 with 1 MB L2 cache	Apple A12Z Bionic with 8 MB L3 cache
Memory	1 GB (two 512 MB, two slots empty) DDR2 ECC at 533 MHz	16 GB (not upgradeable) unified LPDDR4X
Graphics	256 MB Intel GMA 900	8-core integrated GPU
Storage	160 GB Serial ATA 7200 rpm HDD	512 GB SSD
Connectivity	Gigabit Ethernet	
Connectivity	—N/a	Wi-Fi 5 (802.11a/b/g/n/ac)
Connectivity	—N/a	Bluetooth 5.0
Peripherals	2× FireWire 400	2× USB-C 3.1
Peripherals	3× USB 2.0	2× USB 3.0 Type A
Peripherals	DVI-D	HDMI 2.0
Audio	3.5 mm headphone jack	
Audio	Built-in mono speaker	
Dimensions (H × W × D)	20.1 × 8.1 × 18.7 in (511 × 206 × 475 mm)	1.4 × 7.8 × 7.8 in (36 × 197 × 197 mm)
Weight	?	2.54 lb (1.15 kg)
OS	Mac OS X 10.4.1 Tiger (preview release)	macOS 11.0 Big Sur (preview release)
