= MacOS Big Sur =

2020 operating system version

macOS Big Sur
- Version of the macOS operating system

- Screenshot of macOS Big Sur in light appearance
- Developer: Apple
- OS family: Macintosh; Unix, based on Darwin (BSD)
- Working state: No longer supported
- Source model: Closed, with open source components
- General availability: November 12, 2020; 6 years ago
- Latest release: 11.7.11 (20G1443) (February 2, 2026; 9 months ago) [±]
- Update method: Software Update
- Supported platforms: x86-64, ARM64
- Kernel type: Hybrid (XNU)
- License: Proprietary software with open-source components
- Preceded by: macOS Catalina
- Succeeded by: macOS Monterey
- Official website: MacOS Big Sur (archived at Wayback Machine)
- Tagline: Doing it all, in new ways.

Support status
- Unsupported as of February 2, 2026. Finder is still able to download driver updates to sync to newer devices.

macOS Big Sur (version 11) is the seventeenth major release of macOS, Apple's operating system for Macintosh computers. The successor to macOS Catalina, it was announced at WWDC 2020 on June 22, 2020, and was released to the public on November 12, 2020. It was succeeded by macOS Monterey, which was released on October 25, 2021.

For the first time since OS X Yosemite six years earlier, macOS Big Sur features a user interface redesign. It features new blurs to establish a visual hierarchy, along with making icons more square and UI elements more consistent. Other changes include a revamp of the Time Machine backup mechanism, and the addition of the Control Center (which was previously introduced, exclusively for touch devices, with iOS 7). It is also the first macOS version to support Macs with ARM-based Apple silicon processors. To mark the transition, the operating system's major version number was incremented, for the first time since 2001, from 10.15 (macOS Catalina) to 11. The release of Big Sur was the first time the major version number of the operating system had been incremented since the Mac OS X Public Beta in 2000. The operating system is named after the coastal region of Big Sur in the Central Coast of California, continuing the naming trend of California locations that began with OS X Mavericks.

macOS Big Sur is the final version of macOS that supports Macs with Nvidia graphics cards, specifically the 15-inch dual graphics late 2013 and mid 2014 MacBook Pro models, as its successor, macOS Monterey, drops support for those models.

== Development history ==
macOS Big Sur was formally announced at Apple's annual Worldwide Developers Conference (WWDC) on June 22, 2020, with the first developer beta being released the same day. The first public beta was released on August 6, 2020, and it was released to the general public on November 12, 2020.

Providing some indication as to how the pre-release operating system may have been viewed internally at Apple during its development cycle, documentation accompanying the initial beta release of macOS Big Sur referred to its version as "10.16", and when upgrading from prior versions of macOS using the Software Update mechanism to early beta releases, the version referred to was "10.16". An exception to this was the Developer Transition Kit, which always reported the system version as "11.0". macOS Big Sur started reporting the system version as "11.0" on all Macs as of the third beta release.

To maintain backwards compatibility, macOS Big Sur identified itself as 10.16 to legacy software and in the browser user agent.

== System requirements ==
Unlike macOS Catalina, which supported every standard configuration Mac that Mojave supported, Big Sur drops support for various Macs released in 2012 and early 2013. Big Sur runs on the following Macs:

- iMac (mid 2014 or later)
- iMac Pro (2017)
- MacBook (early 2015 or later)
- MacBook Air (mid 2013 or later)
- MacBook Pro (late 2013 or later)
- Mac Mini (late 2014 or later)
- Mac Pro (late 2013 or later)
- Developer Transition Kit (only up to Big Sur 11.3 beta 2)

By using patcher tools (such as OpenCore Legacy), macOS 11 Big Sur can be installed on earlier computers that are officially unsupported, such as the 2012 iMac and the 2012 MacBook Pro. Using these methods, it is possible to install macOS Big Sur on computers as old as a 2008 MacBook Pro and iMac and 2009 Mac Mini running smooth with non-metal graphics.

== Changes ==
=== Design ===
macOS Big Sur refreshes the design of the user interface, described by Apple as the biggest change since the introduction of Mac OS X. Its changes include translucency in various places, a new abstract wallpaper for the first time and a new color palette. All standard apps, as well as the Dock and the Menu Bar, are redesigned and streamlined, and their icons now have square shapes like iOS and iPadOS apps, and are distinctly more round. Compared to iOS, Big Sur's icons include more shading and highlights to give a three-dimensional appearance. Its aesthetic has been described as "neumorphism", a portmanteau of new and skeuomorphism. System sounds are redone as well.

The new OS also brings further integration with Apple's SF Symbols, enabling easier use by third-party developers as UI elements for their applications through AppKit, SwiftUI, and Catalyst, which makes it possible to unify third-party applications with the existing Apple-made design language.

The Siri icon in macOS Big Sur was an all-white, outlined version of the Siri waveform/globe, contained within the new standard rounded-rectangle app icon shape. This design was part of the broad redesign of app icons in Big Sur to promote visual consistency across the Apple ecosystem. In macOS Sequoia, the Siri interface was updated as part of the new Apple Intelligence features. The traditional circular "orb" or "globe in a rectangle" look was replaced with a new visual effect: the borders of the screen glow when Siri is active, rather than a distinct icon appearing at the bottom of the screen.

=== Interface ===
==== Control Center ====
An interface with quick toggles for Wi-Fi, Bluetooth, screen brightness and system volume has been added to the menu bar. This interface is functionally and visually similar to the Control Center on iOS and iPadOS.

==== Notification Center ====
The Notification Center is redesigned, featuring interactive notifications and a transparent user interface. Notification Center also features a new widget system similar to that in iOS 14, displaying more information with more customization than previously available.

=== System ===
==== Support for Apple silicon ====
macOS Big Sur is the first release of macOS for Macs powered by Apple-designed ARM64-based processors, a key part of the transition from Intel x86-64-based processors. The chip mentioned in demo videos, and used in the Developer Transition Kit, is the A12Z Bionic. On November 10, 2020, Apple announced the first Mac Apple silicon chip, the Apple M1, in the Late 2020 Mac Mini, MacBook Air, and MacBook Pro. Apple has said that it will support Intel Macs "for years to come", and most software that has not been ported to run on ARM Macs can use Rosetta 2, an x86 emulator and compatibility layer. Likewise, Apple also labeled multi-architecture binary files containing both x86-64 and ARM64 code as Universal 2 binaries, allowing developers to package their applications so that they can run natively on both ARM64 and x86-64 processors.

==== Support for iOS and iPadOS applications ====
On Macs based on Apple silicon, macOS Big Sur can run iOS and iPadOS applications natively and without any modifications needed from developers, aside from allowing the app to be available on the Mac App Store. The first Macs with this capability are those that use the Apple M1 SoC (system on a chip).

==== Time Machine overhaul ====
Time Machine, the backup mechanism introduced back in Mac OS X 10.5 Leopard, has been overhauled to utilize the APFS file system (introduced in MacOS High Sierra) instead of the outdated HFS+. Specifically, the new version of Time Machine makes use of APFS's snapshot technology. According to Apple, this enables "faster, more compact, and more reliable backups" than were possible previously with HFS+-formatted backup destinations. An independent evaluation of this claim found that Time Machine on macOS 11 in conjunction with APFS was 2.75-fold faster upon initial local backup and 4-fold faster upon subsequent backups relative to macOS 10.15's Time Machine implementation using HFS+. A more modest yet nevertheless significant advantage was noted as well for backups to network-attached disks.

New local (i.e. USB- or Thunderbolt-connected) and network-connected Time Machine backup destinations are formatted as APFS by default, though Time Machine can continue backing up to existing HFS+ backup volumes. There is no option to convert existing, HFS+-based backups to APFS; instead, users who want to benefit from the advantages of the new, APFS-based implementation of Time Machine need to start with a fresh volume.

In the new version of Time Machine, encryption appears to be required (instead of merely optional) for local disks, but it remains elective for networked volumes.

It is no longer possible to restore the whole system using a Time Machine backup, as the signed system volume is not backed up. Non-core applications and user data can be restored in full using Migration Assistant, preceded by a system reinstall if necessary.

==== Spotlight ====
Spotlight, the file system indexing-and-search mechanism introduced in Mac OS X 10.4 Tiger, is faster and the interface has been refined. Spotlight is now the default search mechanism in Safari, Pages, and Keynote.

==== Signed system volume ====
The system volume containing the core operating system is cryptographically signed. Apple indicates this is a security measure to prevent malicious tampering. This includes adding an SHA-256 hash for every file on the system volume, preventing changes from third-party entities and the end user.

==== Software updates ====
Software updates can begin in the background before a restart, thus requiring less downtime to complete. Because system files are cryptographically signed, the update software can rely on them being in precise locations, thus permitting them to be effectively updated in place.

==== Encryption ====
macOS Big Sur supports encryption at the file level. Earlier versions of macOS (10.15 Catalina and older) supported encryption only at the level of entire volumes. As of June 2020, this capability is known to be compatible with Macs based on Apple silicon; it is unclear whether it is compatible with Intel-based Macs.

=== Other changes ===
- Bilingual dictionaries in French–German, Indonesian–English, Japanese–Simplified Chinese and Polish–English
- Better predictive input for Chinese and Japanese users
- New fonts for Indian users
- The "Now Playing" widget has been moved from the Notification Center to the Menu Bar
- Podcasts "Listen Now" feature
- FaceTime sign language prominence
- Network Utility has been replaced with a message that it has been deprecated
- A new startup chime was added (it was absent on all machines released from 2016 to 2020) and is now enabled by default; an option was added in System Preferences to enable or disable this functionality.

== Application features ==
The Safari 14 start page with Wikipedia on the reading list

=== Safari ===
Big Sur includes Safari 14, which was also released for macOS Catalina and macOS Mojave on September 16, 2020. Safari 14 includes features such as a new home page in which users can customize what features are visible in addition to being able to set a custom wallpaper. It also allows the viewer to preview a page and favicon before visiting it.

Safari 14 also includes built-in web page translations in English, Spanish, German, French, Russian, Chinese and Portuguese as well as support for 4K HDR content from Netflix on Macs with an Apple T2 chip, although none of these were made available for macOS Catalina and Mojave.

Privacy features such as iCloud Keychain (which notifies users of compromised passwords), extension privacy management and Privacy Report (which monitors privacy trackers and further increases Safari's security) were added for Safari 14. Users were now also able to import password from Google's Chrome browser in addition to being notified of compromised passwords.

Safari 14 also supports WebExtensions API, the WebP image format as well as VP9 decoding, the latter of which allows for the playback of 4K and HDR content from YouTube. In addition, it allowed for better performance and power efficiency.

Safari 14 ended support for Adobe Flash Player in September, three months prior to its end-of-life on December 31, 2020.

=== Messages ===
The Messages app was rewritten to be based upon Apple's Catalyst technology to enable it to have feature parity with its iOS counterpart and to reduce development time and cost. The new version of the app included a refined design as well as the ability to pin up to nine conversations that can sync across iOS, iPadOS and macOS. Users were also now allowed to search for messages and share their names and photos. Photo thumbnails could now also be used for group chats on the app.

In addition, users could mention contacts by putting the @ symbol in front of their name. They were also able to reply to specific messages. Memojis, 3d avatars were also made available on Messages. On Messages, users could now select photos based on parameters.

In India, text message effects were added when users sent certain texts (e.g., texting "Happy Holi" will result in users seeing effects).

=== Changes to the Mac App Store ===
The Mac App Store showing the Safari Extensions category

Refinements and new features of the Mac App Store include:

- A new "nutrition label" section dedicated to the data and information an app collects, also featured in the iOS App Store
- A new extensions category for Safari
- Third party Notification Center widgets, similar to those also added in iOS and iPadOS 14.
- The ability to share in-app purchases and subscriptions on the Mac via iCloud Family Sharing

=== Notes ===
- Collapsible pinned section
- Quick text style and formatting options
- Scanning enhancements

=== Photos ===
- New editing capabilities
- Improved Retouch tool
- New zooming feature in views

=== Maps ===
- Rewritten as a Catalyst app, reducing development time and improving iOS parity.
- "Look Around" interactive street-level 360° panoramas, first implemented in the iOS 13 version of Maps, have been incorporated into the macOS version of Maps.
- Availability of directions for cyclists.
- Electric vehicle routing, based on proximity to charging stations and monitoring of battery levels (on selected car models).
- Guides for exploring new places.

=== Voice Memos ===
- A file structure has been implemented to allow organization of recordings in folders
- Recordings can be marked as Favorites for easier subsequent access
- Smart Folders automatically group Apple Watch recordings, recently deleted recordings, and Favorites
- Audio can be enhanced to reduce background noise and room reverb

== Removed functionality ==
- Calculator Notification Center Widget
- Option to toggle Font Smoothing in System Preferences
- Removed the option not to have a clock in the menu bar.

== Criticism ==
The rollout of Big Sur came with several problems. Upgrading to the initial public release of Big Sur (version 11.0.1) bricked some computers, rendering them unusable. Many of these were 2013 and 2014 MacBook Pros, though problems were also observed on a 2019 MacBook Pro and an iMac from the same year. The initial rollout also disrupted Apple's app notarization process, causing slowdowns even on devices not running Big Sur. Users also reported that the update was slow or even might fail to install. macOS Catalina and Big Sur apps were taking a long time to load because of Gatekeeper issues.

The issues with the COVID-19 pandemic meant it was hard for users to visit an Apple Store to get their machines fixed. Shortly afterwards, Apple released a series of steps explaining how these Macs could be recovered.

Certain Apple applications running on early versions of Big Sur were reported to bypass firewalls, raising privacy and security concerns. This was addressed with the release of macOS Big Sur 11.2, which removed the whitelist for built-in programs. Conversely, security experts have reported that Big Sur will check an application's certificate every time it is run, degrading system performance. There have been reports that the operating system sends a hash back to Apple of every program run and when it was executed. Apple responded that the process is part of efforts to protect users from malware embedded in applications downloaded outside of the Mac App Store.

Some users have reported problems connecting external displays to Macs running Big Sur 11.1 and 11.2.

When upgrading Macs from 10.13, 10.14 and 10.15 to Big Sur the upgrade process could become stuck for seemingly unclear reasons. Only a full system restore from backup would solve this problem. In October 2021, a solution became known that required removal of up to several hundred thousand excess temporary files in the system folders. The problem was fixed in December 2021 in the Big Sur 11.6.2 Full installer.

== Vulnerability ==
In 2021, there were reports of two pieces of malware that infected macOS and include both x86-64 and ARM64 code. The first one was detected in early 2021. The second one, Silver Sparrow, was detected on nearly 30,000 Macs in February 2021.

== Release history ==
The public release of macOS 11 Big Sur began with 11.0.1 for Intel Macs. Version 11.0 was preinstalled on Apple silicon Macs, and Apple advised those with that version to be updated to 11.0.1.

macOS Big Sur releases
Version	Build	Release date	Darwin version	Release notes
11.0 (Note: Preinstalled on MacBook Air (M1, 2020), MacBook Pro (13-inch, M1, 2020), and Mac mini (M1, 2020))	20A2411	November 17, 2020	20.1.0 xnu-7195.41.8~9	Release notes Security content
11.0.1	20B29 (Note: Initial public release)	November 12, 2020	20.1.0 xnu-7195.50.7~2	Release notes Security content
11.0.1	20B50 (Note: Available for all Macs except Late 2013 and Mid 2014 13" MacBook Pros)	November 19, 2020	20.1.0 xnu-7195.50.7~2	Release notes Security content
11.1	20C69	December 14, 2020	20.2.0 xnu-7195.60.75~1	Release notes Security content
11.2	20D64	February 1, 2021	20.3.0 xnu-7195.81.3~1	Release notes Security content
11.2.1	20D74	February 9, 2021	20.3.0 xnu-7195.81.3~1	Release notes Security content
11.2.1	20D75 (Note: Fixes bug where installation with insufficient free space could cause data loss – exclusive to the full installer)	February 15, 2021	20.3.0 xnu-7195.81.3~1	Release notes Security content
11.2.2	20D80	February 25, 2021	20.3.0 xnu-7195.81.3~1	Release notes
11.2.3	20D91	March 8, 2021	20.3.0 xnu-7195.81.3~1	Release notes Security content
11.3	20E232	April 26, 2021	20.4.0 xnu-7195.101.1~3	Release notes Security content
11.3.1	20E241	May 3, 2021	20.4.0 xnu-7195.101.2~1	Release notes Security content
11.4	20F71	May 24, 2021	20.5.0 xnu-7195.121.3~9	Release notes Security content
11.5	20G71	July 21, 2021	20.6.0 xnu-7195.141.2~5 Wed Jun 23 00:26:31 PDT 2021	Release notes Security content
11.5.1	20G80	July 26, 2021	20.6.0 xnu-7195.141.2~5 Wed Jun 23 00:26:31 PDT 2021	Release notes Security content
11.5.2	20G95	August 11, 2021	20.6.0 xnu-7195.141.2~5 Wed Jun 23 00:26:31 PDT 2021	Release notes
11.6	20G165	September 13, 2021	20.6.0 xnu-7195.141.6~3 Mon Aug 30 06:12:21 PDT 2021	Release notes Security content
11.6.1	20G224	October 25, 2021	20.6.0 xnu-7195.141.8~1 Tue Oct 12 18:33:42 PDT 2021	Release notes Security content
11.6.2	20G314	December 13, 2021	20.6.0 xnu-7195.141.14~1 Wed Nov 10 22:23:07 PST 2021	Release notes Security content
11.6.3	20G415	January 26, 2022	20.6.0 xnu-7195.141.19~2 Wed Jan 12 22:22:42 PST 2022	Release notes Security content
11.6.4	20G417	February 14, 2022	20.6.0 xnu-7195.141.19~2 Wed Jan 12 22:22:42 PST 2022	Release notes
11.6.5	20G527	March 14, 2022	20.6.0 xnu-7195.141.26~1 Tue Feb 22 21:10:41 PST 2022	Release notes Security content
11.6.6	20G624	May 16, 2022	20.6.0 xnu-7195.141.29~1 Tue Apr 19 21:04:45 PDT 2022	Release notes Security content
11.6.7	20G630	June 9, 2022	20.6.0 xnu-7195.141.29~1 Tue Apr 19 21:04:45 PDT 2022	Release notes
11.6.8	20G730	July 20, 2022	20.6.0 xnu-7195.141.32~1 Tue Jun 21 20:50:28 PDT 2022	Release notes Security content
11.7	20G817	September 12, 2022	20.6.0 xnu-7195.141.39~2 Mon Aug 29 04:31:06 PDT 2022	Release notes Security content
11.7.1	20G918	October 24, 2022	20.6.0 xnu-7195.141.42~1 Thu Sep 29 20:15:11 PDT 2022	Release notes Security content
11.7.2	20G1020	December 13, 2022	20.6.0 xnu-7195.141.46~1 Sun Nov 6 23:17:00 PST 2022	Release notes Security content
11.7.3	20G1116	January 23, 2023	20.6.0 xnu-7195.141.49~1 Fri Dec 16 00:35:00 PST 2022	Release notes Security content
11.7.4	20G1120	February 15, 2023	20.6.0 xnu-7195.141.49~1 Fri Dec 16 00:35:00 PST 2022	Release notes
11.7.5	20G1225	March 27, 2023	20.6.0 xnu-7195.141.49.700.6~1 Thu Mar 9 20:39:26 PST 2023	Release notes Security content
11.7.6	20G1231	April 10, 2023	20.6.0 xnu-7195.141.49.700.6~1 Thu Mar 9 20:39:26 PST 2023	Release notes Security content
11.7.7	20G1345	May 18, 2023	20.6.0 xnu-7195.141.49.701.3~1 Mon Apr 24 23:00:57 PDT 2023	Release notes Security content
11.7.8	20G1351	June 21, 2023	20.6.0 xnu-7195.141.49.701.4~1 Thu Jun 8 22:36:09 PDT 2023	Release notes Security content
11.7.9	20G1426	July 24, 2023	20.6.0 xnu-7195.141.49.702.12~1 Thu Jul 6 22:12:47 PDT 2023	Release notes Security content
11.7.10	20G1427	September 11, 2023	20.6.0 xnu-7195.141.49.702.12~1 Thu Jul 6 22:12:47 PDT 2023	Release notes Security content
11.7.11	20G1443	February 2, 2026	20.6.0 xnu-7195.141.49.702.12~1 Thu Jul 6 22:12:47 PDT 2023	Release notes

See Apple's main pages for Big Sur release notes: for consumers, for enterprise, as well as their current security content page.

Preceded by macOS 10.15 (Catalina)	macOS 11 (Big Sur); 2020	Succeeded by macOS 12 (Monterey)
