= Product binning =

Categorizing products by quality

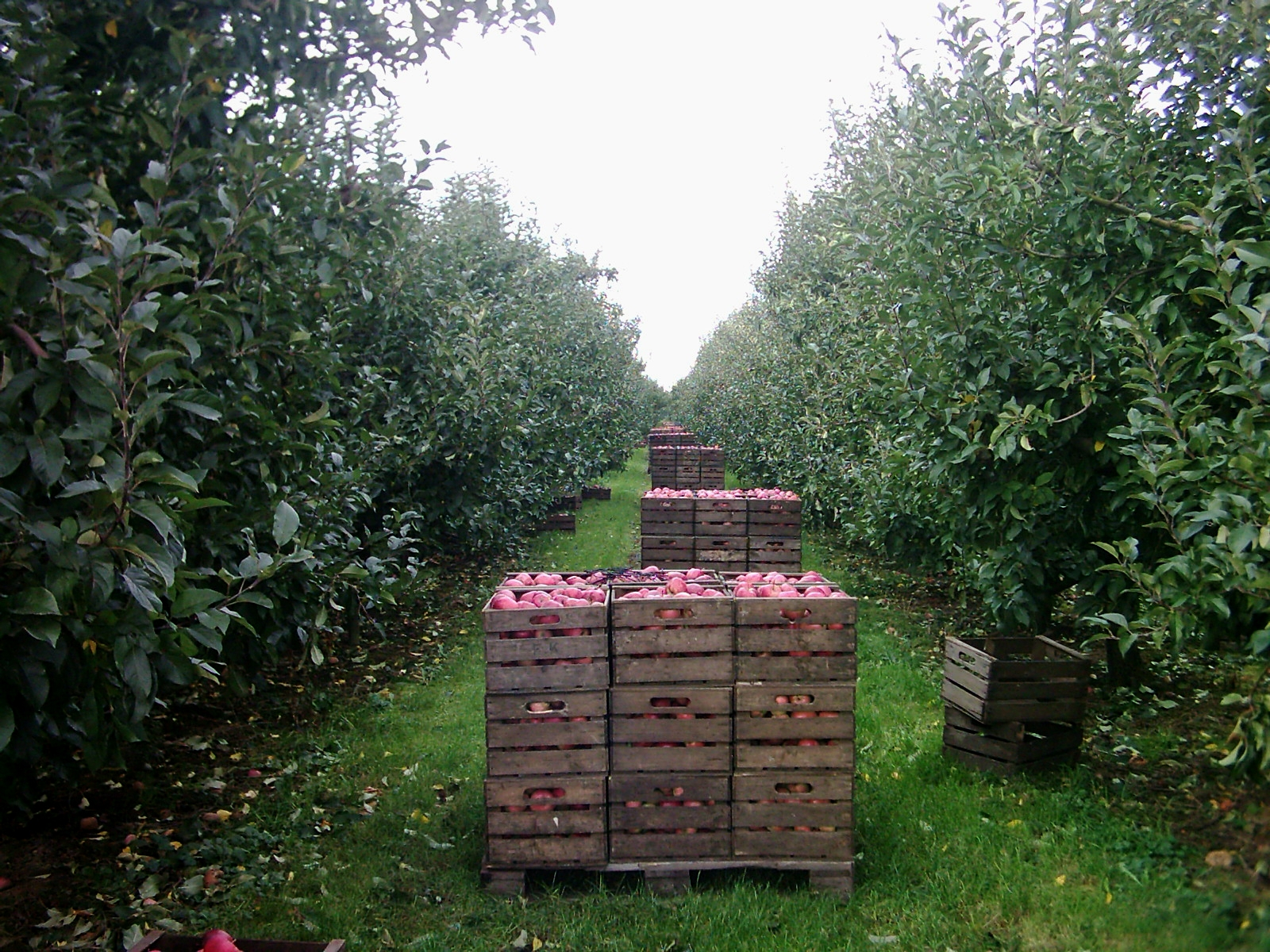
Bins of apples in an orchard. The practice of sorting crops into bins by grade gave rise to the term "binning".

Product binning is the categorizing of finished products based on their characteristics. Any mining, harvesting, or manufacturing process will yield products spanning a range of quality and desirability in the marketplace. Binning allows differing quality products to be priced appropriately for various uses and markets.

== Economic and legal theory ==
In order to undergo binning, manufactured products require testing, usually performed by machines in bulk. Binning allows large variances in performance to be condensed into a smaller number of marketed designations. This ensures coherency in the marketplace, with tiers of performance clearly delineated. The immediate result of this practice is that, for legal and reputational reasons, products sold under a certain designation must meet that designation at a minimum. Individual products may still exceed advertised performance. Different bins may even be assigned different model numbers and prices. Examples are listed in the sections below for various product categories.

== Agriculture ==
An everyday example of product binning occurs with agricultural products, such as fruits, nuts, and vegetables. The yield from a harvest may vary considerably in quality, from near-inedible to ideal photographic appearance. The produce is sorted into quality categories which may be based on nutrition and safety, but also often have criteria that are based on cosmetic appearance. The best quality items may be classified into categories such as "Choice" or "Grade A", and are sold at a premium price for table presentation and consumption.

Items that are less visually appealing or damaged may be binned for incorporation into frozen, dried, canned, or otherwise-processed foods. Consumers rarely see these lesser categories for sale in a raw, unprocessed condition.

Foods of even lower quality may be processed into pet food or animal feed, or composted into fertilizer.

== Semiconductor manufacturing ==
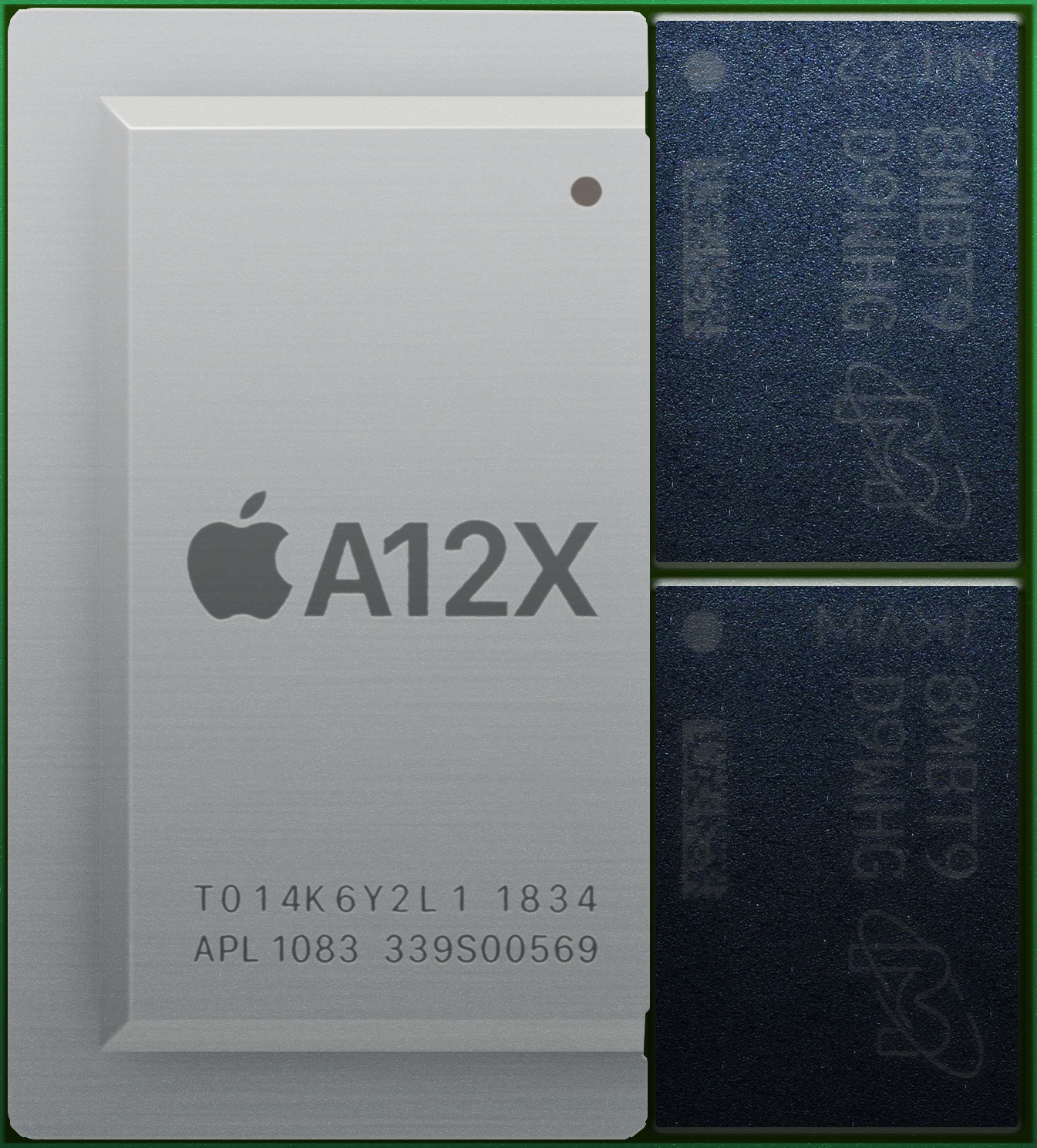
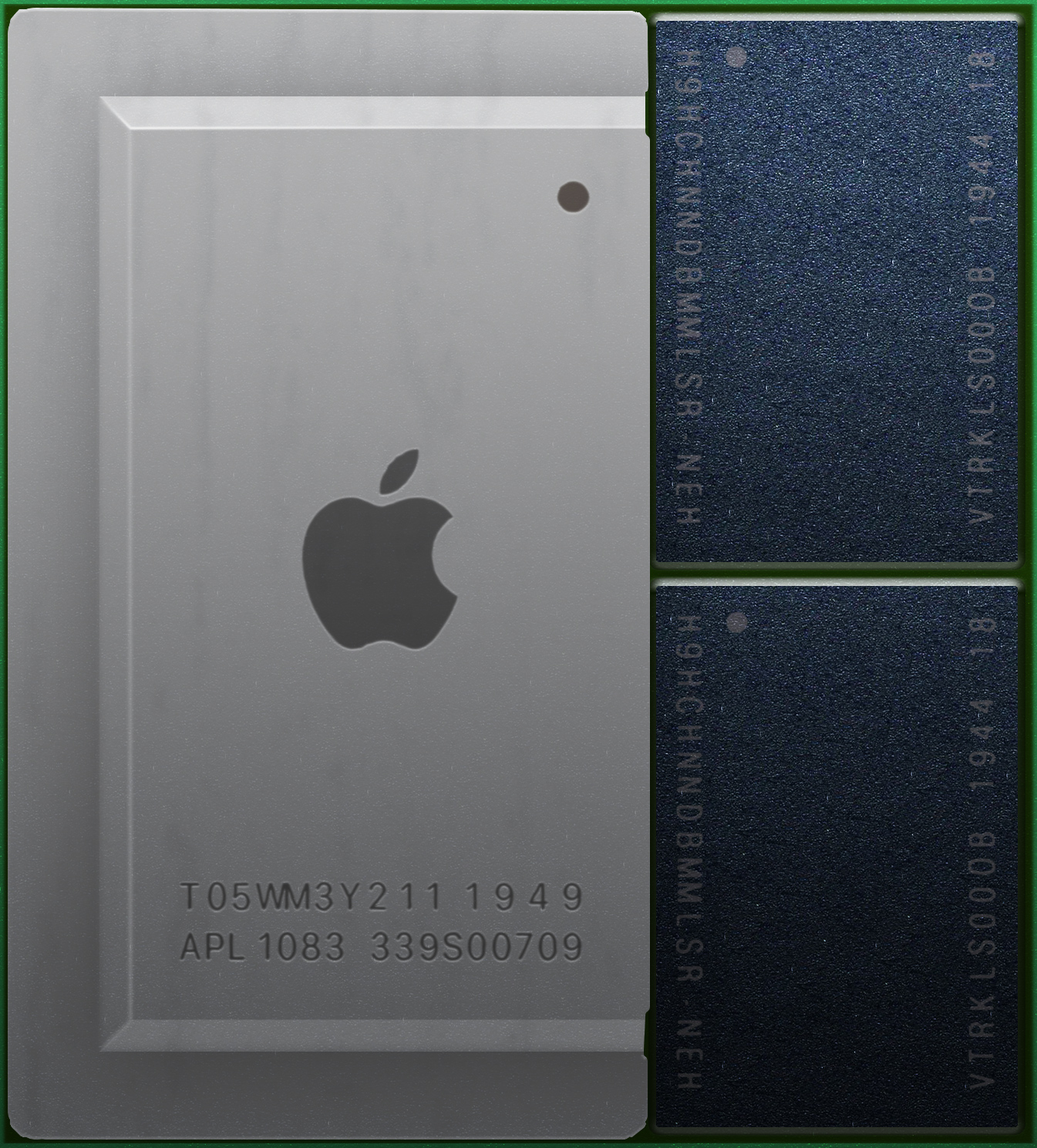
An example of chip binning: Apple's A12X (left) and A12Z (right) share the same die, but one GPU is disabled on the A12X

Semiconductor manufacturing is an inherently variable process, sometimes achieving yields as low as 30 percent. Not every defect renders a chip unusable; by reducing the clock frequency or disabling the affected components, chips that would otherwise be discarded can be sold at a lower price for use in lower-cost products. As in agriculture, where crops are sorted into bins by quality, lower-specification chips are separated out and sold accordingly, a practice that gives rise to the term "binned chips".

This practice is common throughout the semiconductor industry, applied to products including CPUs, RAM, GPUs, and SSDs.

Apple employs chip binning as a cost-reduction strategy across its Apple silicon lineup, improving manufacturing yield and allowing the company to offer products at different price points without designing and manufacturing separate chips. Examples include entry-level MacBook Air models, which have shipped with one or two GPU cores disabled, and the iPhone 17e, which uses a binned A19 with fewer GPU cores than the standard iPhone 17.

=== Speed bump ===
A speed bump, in the context of semiconductors, refers to when a company sells a chip with a minor increase in clock frequency (e.g., from 1.8 to 1.9 GHz) or other small improvements between otherwise identical chips. This is often the result of improved manufacturing, or the use of conservative initial ratings. The revised chips are sold as a separate product bin, typically at slightly higher price point.

=== Core unlocking ===
To improve yield, chips are sometimes fabricated with additional components beyond those advertised. On chips with no defects, the additional components may be disabled. It is sometimes possible for the end user to enable these components. To prevent this, some manufacturers employ laser trimming to physically disable the component and prevent them from being enabled later.
