= IPad Pro (3rd generation) =

Tablet computer developed by Apple (2018–2020)

iPad Pro (3rd generation)

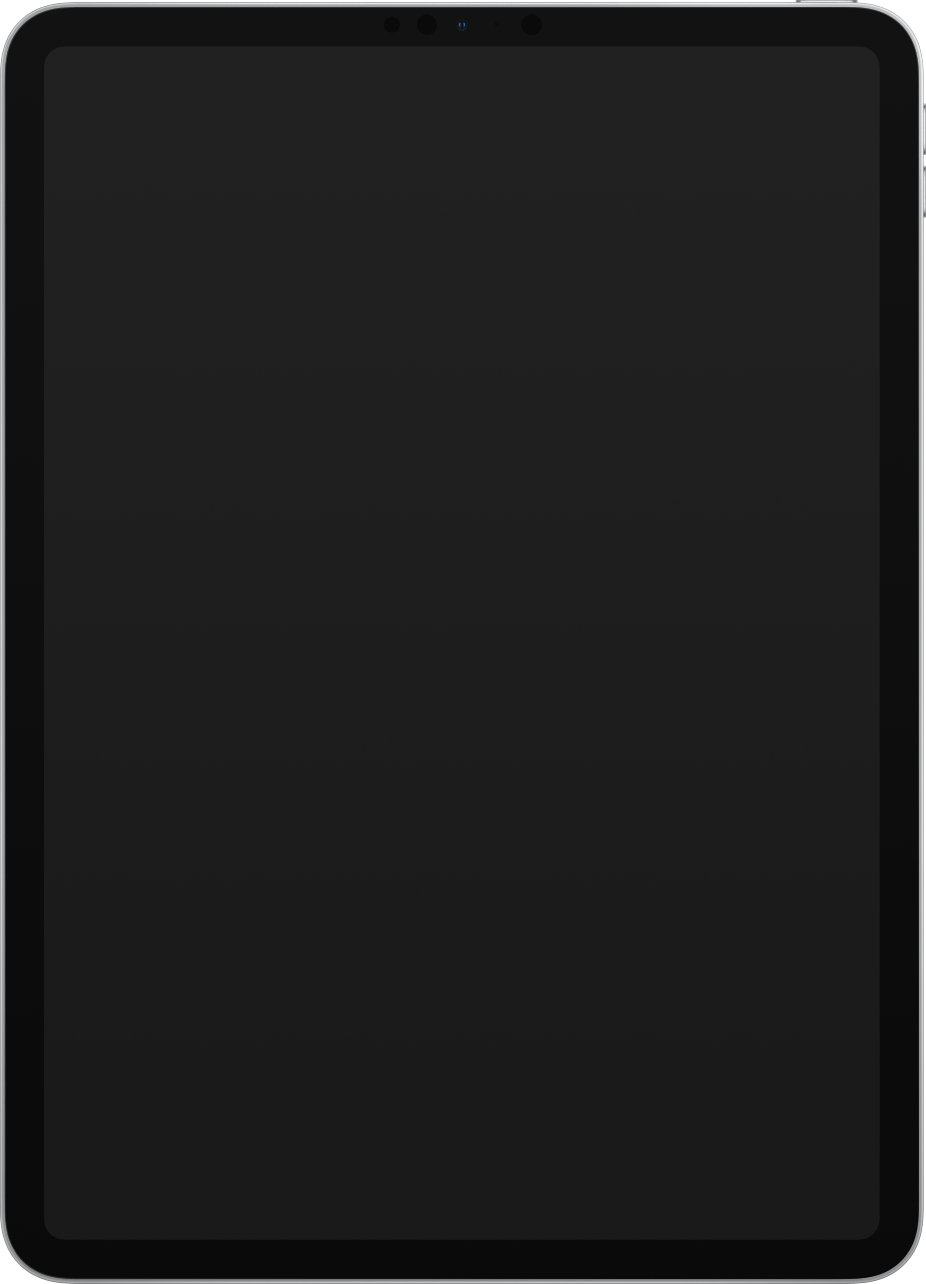
- An 11-inch iPad Pro
- Developer: Apple Inc.
- Product family: iPad Pro
- Type: Tablet computer
- Released: November 7, 2018; 8 years ago
- Discontinued: March 18, 2020; 6 years ago
- Operating system: Original: iOS 12.1; Current: iPadOS 26.7.2, released October 26, 2026
- System on a chip: A12X Bionic
- Memory: 4 GB or 6 GB LPDDR4X
- Storage: 11 inch: 128 GB, 256 GB, 512 GB, 1 TB or 2 TB; 12.9 inch: 64 GB, 256 GB, 512 GB or 1 TB
- Display: 11 inch: (28 cm) (2,388 x 1,668) px (264 ppi), 600-nits Max Brightness, Wide-Color Display (P3), True Tone Display, 1.8% reflectivity, and Fully Laminated Display; 12.9 inch: (33 cm) (2,732 x 2,048) px (264 ppi), 600-nits Max Brightness, Wide-Color Display (P3), True Tone Display, 1.8% reflectivity, and Fully Laminated Display
- Sound: Four speakers, adjusting sound to device orientation
- Predecessor: iPad Pro (2nd generation)
- Successor: iPad Pro (4th generation)
- Related: Apple Pencil
- Website: www.apple.com/ipad-pro/ at the Wayback Machine (archived September 9, 2019)

The third generation of iPad Pro (Note: Apple markets iPad Pro models by specific screen size. Because the 12.9 inch model has the same screen size as the generations before, but the 11 inch model's screen is larger, the two models are designated "iPad Pro 12.9‑inch (3rd generation)" and "iPad Pro 11‑inch (1st generation)".) is a line of tablet computers developed and marketed by Apple Inc. Two models, with a 12.9 inch or 11 inch screen, were both announced on October 30, 2018, and were available to purchase on November 7. This generation of iPad Pro was the first iPad compatible with the new (second generation) Apple Pencil stylus. Like the second generation, a larger size and stylus compatibility were a point of difference from the rest of Apple's available iPads, but the third generation iPad Pro was also the first iPad to use facial recognition (Face ID) to unlock the device.

Upgrades from the second generation iPad Pro include the more powerful A12X Bionic processor, storage capacity up to 1 terabyte and the larger display of the 11 inch model (upgraded from a 10.5 inch model). The third generation iPad Pro also premiered a new design, with a screen that covers more of the front face, and has rounded corners. The 11 inch model is the first generation of that size, and describes itself as such.

== Features ==
The redesigned iPad Pro was announced on October 30, 2018, during an Apple Special Event at the Howard Gilman Opera House in Brooklyn, New York. The 2018 models feature new edge-to-edge Liquid Retina displays, Face ID, improved 12-megapixel and 7-megapixel cameras, USB-C connector, and Apple A12X Bionic processors. The sides of the tablet have been flattened, distinct from the round sides of preceding models. The tablets are offered in 11-inch and 12.9-inch sizes, and are the first iPad models to offer tap-to-wake displays (following the iPhone X), and up to 1 TB of internal storage. The 1 TB models featured more RAM than the smaller storage sizes with an increase to 6 GB, up from 4 GB. These devices are the first iPads to feature a USB Type-C connector, replacing Apple's proprietary Lightning connector, and both devices gained eSIM for the first time (which replaced the proprietary embedded Apple SIM in the previous generation). The third-generation iPad Pro lacked a home button and a headphone jack, a first for the iPad lineup. Additionally, the tablets lack Touch ID, which has been superseded by Face ID using a sensor array on the top bezel. Unlike iPhone models featuring Face ID until iOS 16, the third-generation iPad Pro can unlock in any orientation. The tablets were released on November 7, 2018, only available in Silver and Space Gray as the Gold and Rose Gold finishes from the previous generation have been removed. The 3rd-generation iPad Pro was the thinnest iPad at 5.9 mm thick, until being surpassed by the 13 inch iPad Pro 7th generation.

== Reception ==
The 2018 iPad Pro models were praised for their improved displays, slimmer bezels, the addition of Face ID and general speed improvements. Ben Sin from Forbes noted that although the screen is still an LCD screen, the 120 Hz refresh rate makes it feel more responsive. The switch to a USB-C connector received a mixed response; easier external monitor support and more universal device charging were added at the cost of extra dongles to use older cables and headphones. Some reviewers noted that although the hardware updates are great steps forward, iOS's limitations, including the lack of external storage capabilities (which was later addressed with the iPadOS 13 update) prevents the iPad Pro from competing against traditional computers. The increased prices across the lineup were also criticized.

The chassis has been criticized for bending and breaking easily. Users on forum boards have reported the iPad bending after a few days of use, such as after carrying it around in a backpack. YouTuber Zack Nelson then published a video on his channel JerryRigEverything showing the device cracking and snapping in half after applying just a small amount of pressure with his hands in the center of the device. Nelson concluded that the "two weakest points [were] right dead center on either side of the iPad Pro, [and] the crack happened at the very poorly placed microphone hole and the new Apple Pencil 2 charging duct". Users reported devices already bent right out of the box, mostly cellular models. Apple responded to these reports quickly, asserting that this is normal and a non-issue, a response which has been criticized by many. According to Apple, the bending is a byproduct of its new manufacturing process and within their tolerances, as described on a support page relating to these issues.

== Software ==
The third generation iPad Pro was supplied with iOS 12.1, It received iPadOS 13 on September 24, 2019, iPadOS 14 on September 16, 2020, iPadOS 15 on September 20, 2021, iPadOS 16 on October 24, 2022, iPadOS 17 on September 18, 2023. and iPadOS 18 on September 16, 2024. iPadOS 26 is the last version compatible with the third generation iPad Pro.

== Timeline ==
Timeline of iPad models
See also: List of Apple products

Source: Apple Newsroom Archive.

== See also ==
- Pen computing
- Graphics tablet
