= UTM (software) =

Virtual machine software

- Developers: Turing Software, LLC
- Stable release: 5.0.7 / 16 October 2026; 10 days ago
- Operating system: macOS, iOS, visionOS
- Platform: Apple–Intel architecture, Apple silicon
- License: Apache License
- Website: getutm.app
- Repository: github.com/utmapp/UTM

UTM is an open-source virtual machine application for macOS, iOS, and visionOS, based primarily on the QEMU emulator project.

== Features ==
UTM functions as either a virtualizer or an emulator. As a virtualizer, UTM runs operating systems that have an underlying architecture compatible with the physical device by directly running the virtual machine code on the host CPU. As an emulator, UTM can run operating systems with a different underlying architecture by running just-in-time compilation on the guest code. UTM can integrate with the built-in hypervisor on macOS for virtualization, and it also supports QEMU as a back-end for both virtualization and emulation. QEMU allows UTM to emulate a wide variety of operating systems. When connected to Apple's built-in hypervisor, UTM can use macOS's Rosetta software to efficiently run x86-64 code on ARM processors.

UTM runs on both Intel and Apple silicon processors. The UTM mobile app only supports emulation. UTM does not support GPU virtualization, so it cannot use APIs for hardware acceleration, such as DirectX and OpenGL.

UTM can be freely downloaded from GitHub, although there is a paid version on the Mac App Store that receives automatic updates. The name "UTM" stands for Universal Turing Machine.

== UTM SE ==
UTM SE is a version of UTM that is modified for the iOS App Store. The original version of UTM can still be installed on iOS through sideloading or an unofficial app store, but it cannot be distributed through the App Store due to Apple's restriction against just-in-time compilation. UTM SE therefore uses QEMU's TCG interpreter instead, avoiding the restriction. SE stands for "slow edition", since the lack of compilation drastically reduces performance.

Released in 2024, UTM SE was the first PC emulator on the iOS App Store. Prior to its release, the App Store had already allowed console emulators such as Delta.

UTM SE supports the iPhone, iPad, and Apple Vision Pro.

== Reception ==
Macworld described UTM as "a good, low-cost option that will particularly appeal to developers and users who have a little more technical knowledge", praising its versatility in supporting both virtualization and emulation while criticizing its complex interface. PCMag described UTM as sluggish when emulating Intel-based systems, and stated that its lack of support for DirectX graphics acceleration makes it a poor choice for gaming.
