= Apple A12X =

System-on-a-chip designed by Apple Inc.

Apple A12X Bionic Apple A12Z Bionic
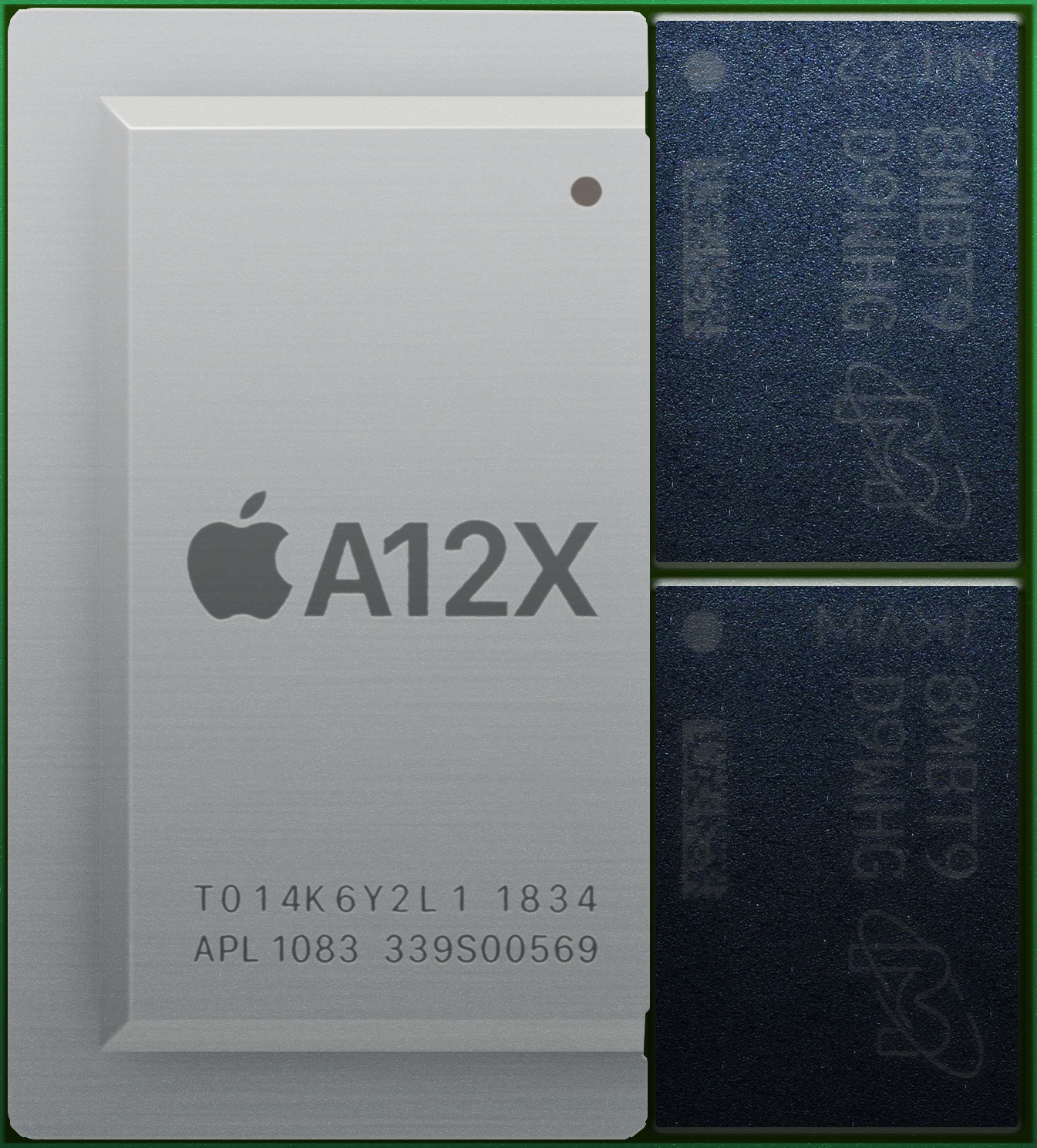

General information
- Launched: A12X: October 30, 2018; A12Z: March 18, 2020
- Discontinued: A12X: March 18, 2020; A12Z: April 20, 2021
- Designed by: Apple Inc.
- Common manufacturer: TSMC
- Product code: APL1083
- Max. CPU clock rate: to 2.49 GHz

Physical specifications
- Cores: 8 (ARM big.LITTLE: 4 "big" Vortex + 4 "little" Tempest)
- GPUs: A12X: 7 cores; A12Z: 8 cores

Cache
- L1 cache: 128 KB instruction and 128 KB data per core
- L2 cache: 8 MB

Architecture and classification
- Technology node: TSMC N7
- Microarchitecture: Vortex; Tempest
- Instruction set: A64 – ARMv8.3-A

Products, models, variants
- Variant: Apple A12

History
- Predecessor: Apple A10X
- Successor: Apple M1

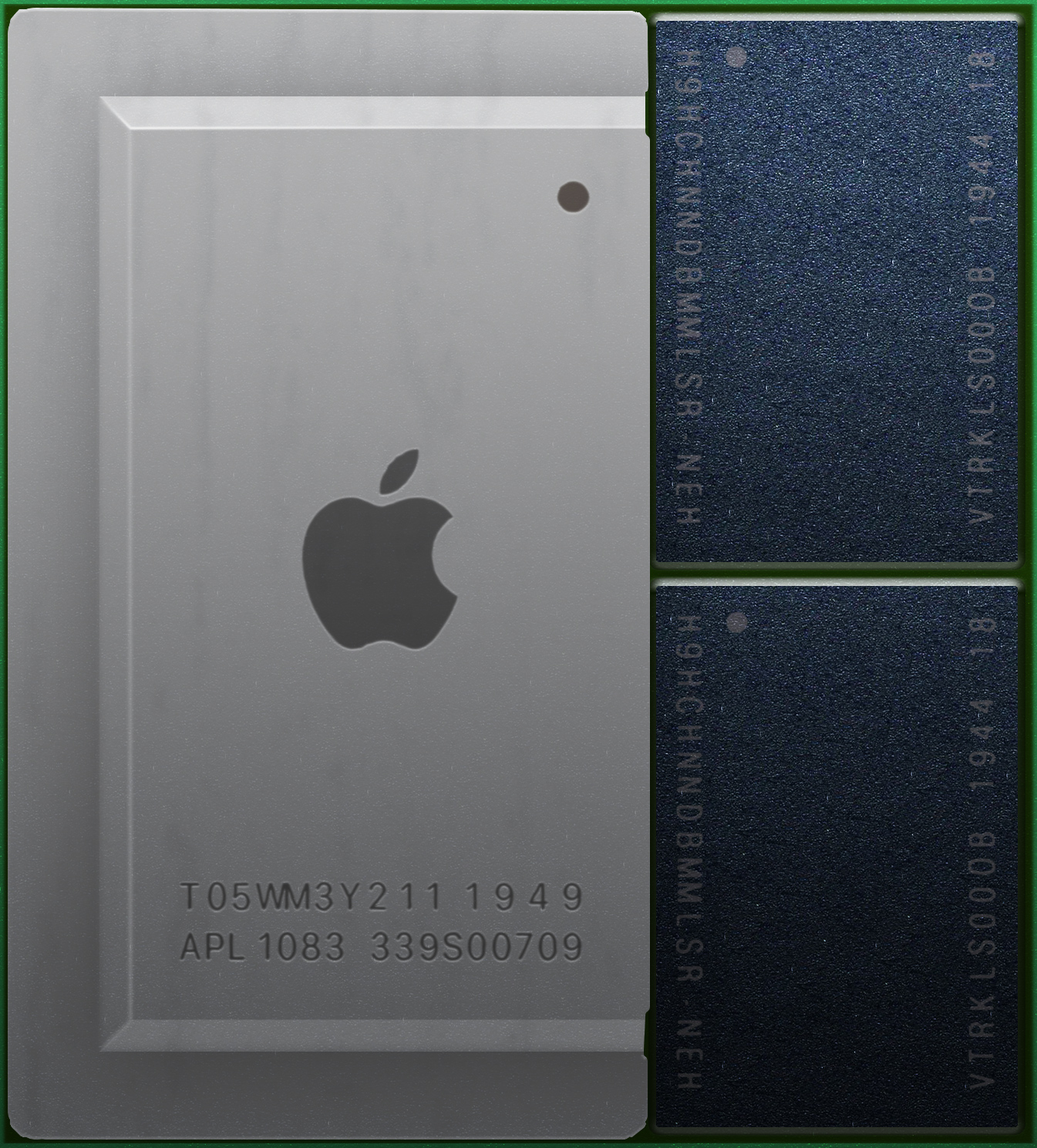
A12Z Bionic

The Apple A12X Bionic is a 64-bit ARM system on a chip (SoC) designed by Apple Inc. and fabricated by TSMC. Part of the Apple silicon family, it was introduced with the third generation iPad Pro on October 30, 2018. It is a higher-performance variant of the A12 chip, featuring an eight-core CPU and a seven-core GPU. Although the chip was designed with eight GPU cores, one core was disabled to improve manufacturing yields and increase the number of usable chips produced from each silicon wafer.

The Apple A12Z Bionic is a revised version of the A12X introduced with the fourth generation iPad Pro on March 18, 2020. It uses the same processor design as the A12X but enables the eighth GPU core after improvements in manufacturing yields.

The A12X was discontinued on March 18, 2020, with the discontinuation of the third generation iPad Pro, while the A12Z was discontinued on April 20, 2021, with the discontinuation of the fourth generation iPad Pro.

iPadOS 26, released in 2025, will be the last major software update for the third-generation iPad Pro. The fourth-generation iPad Pro remains supported by iPadOS 27. The A12Z also powered the Developer Transition Kit, which ran macOS Big Sur during the Mac transition to Apple silicon.

== Design ==
The A12X and A12Z feature an Apple-designed 64-bit ARMv8.3-A octa-core CPU, with four high-performance cores called Vortex and four energy-efficient cores called Tempest. The Vortex cores are a 7-wide decode out-of-order superscalar design, while the Tempest cores are a 3-wide decode out-of-order superscalar design. The Tempest cores are based on Apple's Swift cores from the Apple A6, and are similar in performance to ARM Cortex-A73 CPU cores. It is Apple's first SoC with an octa core CPU.

The A12X integrates an Apple-designed 7-core graphics processing unit (GPU), with twice the graphics performance of the A10X. The A12Z has an 8-core GPU, one more core than the A12X, enabling better performance in 4K video editing, rendering, and augmented reality. Embedded in the A12X and A12Z is the M12 motion coprocessor. The A12Z additionally features tuned performance controllers and a better thermal architecture compared to the A12X, which potentially allows for higher clock speeds. The A12X and A12Z include dedicated neural network hardware that Apple calls a "next-generation Neural Engine". This neural network hardware, which is the same as found in the A12, can perform up to 5 trillion operations per second.

The A12X and A12Z are manufactured by TSMC using a 7 nm FinFET process, and it contains 10 billion transistors vs. the 6.9 billion on the A12. The A12X is paired with 4 GB of LPDDR4X memory in the third-generation 12.9" iPad Pro and the first-generation 11" iPad Pro, or 6 GB in the 1 TB storage configurations. The A12Z is paired with 6 GB of LPDDR4X RAM in the fourth-generation 12.9" iPad Pro and the second-generation 11" iPad Pro.

The A12X has video codec encoding support for HEVC and H.264. It has decoding support for HEVC, H.264, MPEG‑4, and Motion JPEG.

The A12X was designed with eight GPU cores, but Apple disabled one core to improve manufacturing yields and increase the number of usable chips produced from each silicon wafer, reducing production costs. When the A12Z Bionic was introduced, it used the same chip design as the A12X but with the eighth GPU core enabled after manufacturing yields had improved.

=== Developer Transition Kit (2020) ===
At its 2020 Worldwide Developer's Conference, Apple introduced the Developer Transition Kit (2020), which uses the A12Z processor with 16 GB RAM in a Mac mini enclosure, hence being the first Macintosh computer to use the Apple silicon architecture.

The A12Z would be used as the basis for the design of the M1, Apple's first in-house processor designed for use in Mac computers. In an interview shortly after the introduction of the DTK (2020), Apple's SVP of Software Engineering Craig Federighi commented:

“Even that DTK hardware, which is running on an existing iPad chip that we don’t intend to put in a Mac in the future – it’s just there for the transition – the Mac runs awfully nice on that system. It’s not a basis on which to judge future Macs ... but it gives you a sense of what our silicon team can do when they’re not even trying – and they’re going to be trying.”

== Products that include the Apple A12X and A12Z Bionic ==
=== A12X Bionic ===
- iPad Pro (3rd generation)

=== A12Z Bionic ===
- iPad Pro (4th generation)
- Developer Transition Kit (2020)

== See also ==
- Apple silicon, the range of ARM-based processors designed by Apple.
- Apple A12
