= IPad Pro (4th generation) =

Tablet computer developed by Apple (2020–2021)

iPad Pro (4th generation)

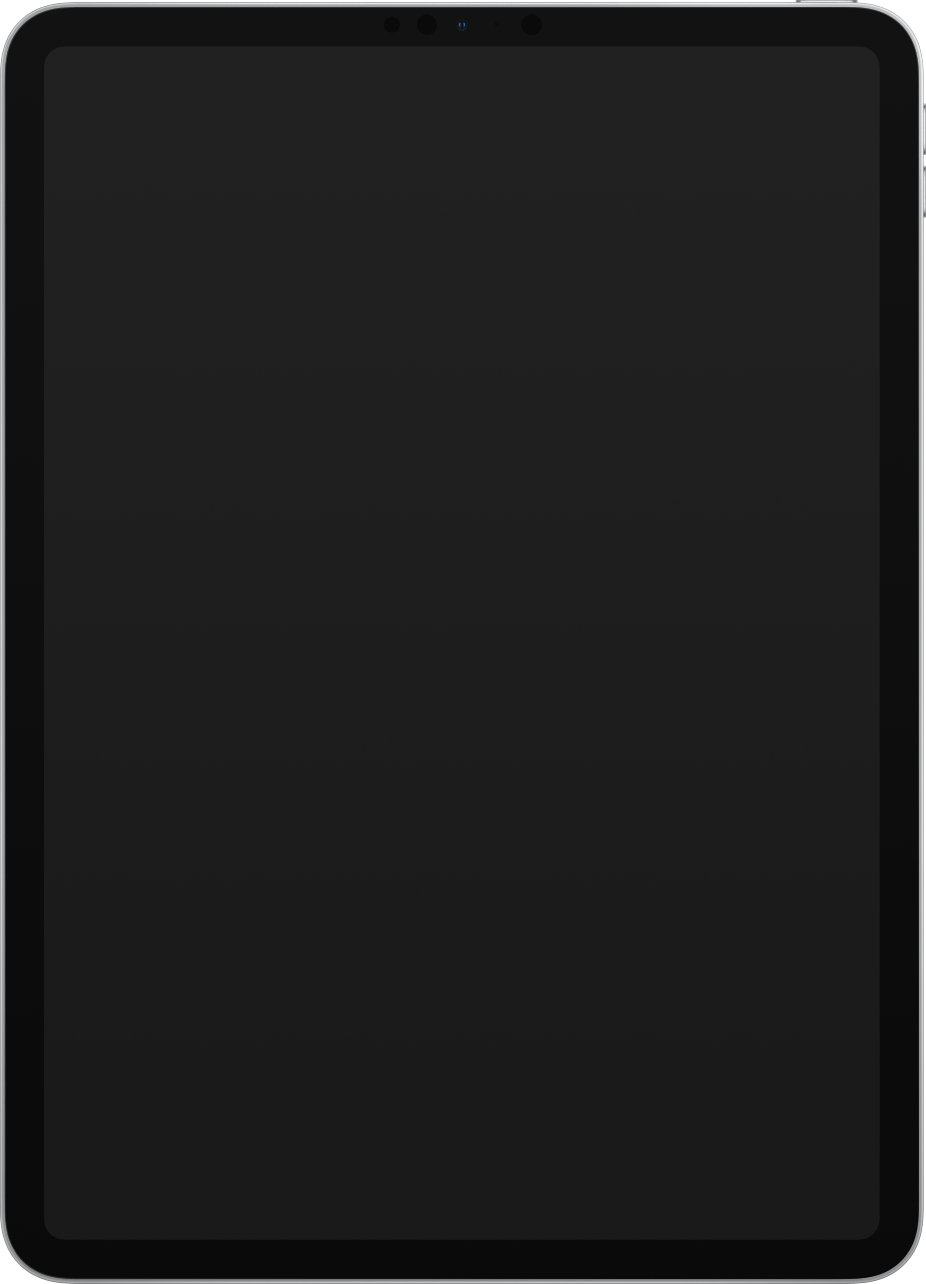
- An 11" iPad Pro
- Developer: Apple Inc.
- Product family: iPad Pro
- Type: Tablet computer
- Generation: 4th
- Released: March 25, 2020; 6 years ago
- Introductory price: 11": $799 (£769); 12.9": $999 (£969)
- Discontinued: April 20, 2021; 5 years ago
- Operating system: Original: iPadOS 13.4; Current: iPadOS 27.0.1, released September 28, 2026
- System on a chip: A12Z Bionic
- Memory: 6 GB LPDDR4X
- Storage: 128 GB; 256 GB; 512 GB; 1 TB
- Display: 11 inch: (28 cm) (2,388 x 1,668) px (264 ppi), 600-nits Max Brightness, Wide-Color Display (P3), True Tone Display, and Fully Laminated Display; 12.9 inch: (33 cm) (2,732 x 2,048) px (264 ppi), 600-nits Max Brightness, Wide-Color Display (P3), True Tone Display, and Fully Laminated Display
- Sound: Four speakers, adjusting sound to device orientation
- Camera: Rear: 12 MP + 10 MP + lidar; 4K@60 video recording; slow-mo 1080p@240 Front: 7 MP
- Dimensions: 11-inch: 247.6 mm (9.75 in) (h); 178.5 mm (7.03 in) (w); 5.9 mm (0.23 in) (d)
- Predecessor: iPad Pro (3rd generation)
- Successor: iPad Pro (5th generation)
- Website: www.apple.com/ipad-pro

The fourth-generation iPad Pro (Note: Apple markets iPad Pro models by specific screen size. The two models are designated "iPad Pro 12.9‑inch (4th generation)" and "iPad Pro 11‑inch (2nd generation)".) is a line of tablet computers developed and marketed by Apple Inc. Two models, with an 11-inch or 12.9 inch screen, were both announced on March 18, 2020, and released on March 25, 2020.

The iPad Pro features a similar design, and the same screen sizes, as the previous generation, but has an upgraded camera module with LiDAR capabilities and an updated A12Z Bionic processor with one additional GPU core. The 11 inch model is the second generation of that size, and describes itself as such.

== Features ==
=== Hardware ===
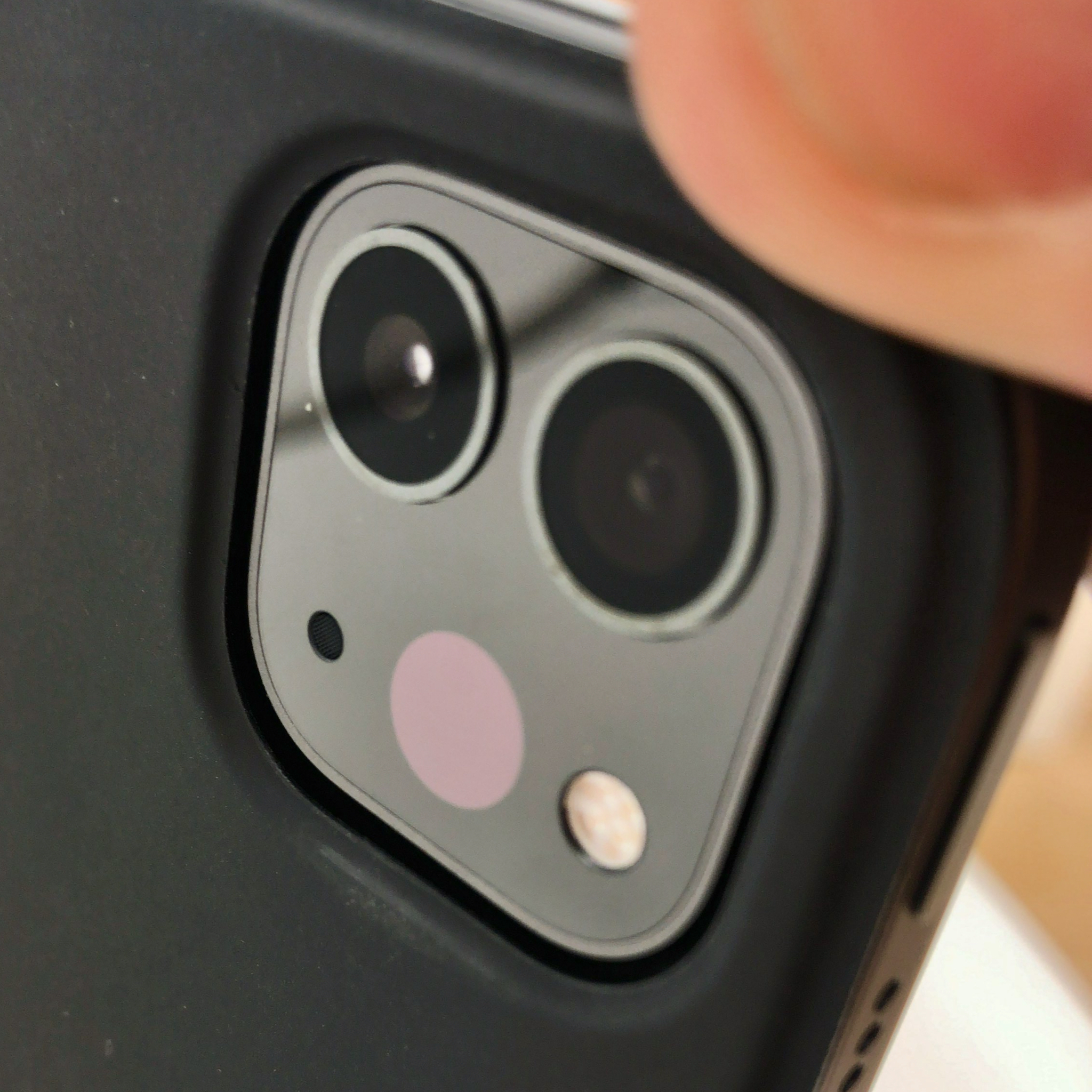
Lidar scanner on iPad Pro

The 2020 model features an Apple A12Z processor, with an octa-core CPU and GPU, support for Wi-Fi 6, and an upgraded camera setup with a 12 MP wide camera, a 10 MP ultra-wide camera, and a lidar scanner for augmented reality. From the 2018 to 2020 models, the RAM was increased from 4 to 6 GB (4-6 GiB) on the 128 GB, 256 GB and 512 GB models. The 4th Generation 1 TB models have the same 6 GB of RAM as the 2018 models. The base storage option was doubled from 64 GB to 128 GB.

=== Accessories ===
A new Magic Keyboard was released on April 22, 2020, which includes a trackpad, backlit keys, USB-C port for pass-through charging, and a cantilever design, allowing the iPad Pro to "float" above the keys. The Magic Keyboard is compatible with the 3rd and 4th generation iPad Pro. Support for trackpads, mice, and pointing devices was announced as a feature of version 13.4 of iPadOS, which was released on March 24, 2020.

Like its predecessor, this version of iPad Pro supports the Apple Pencil, a variety of cases, and USB-C accessories.

== Reception ==
The 2020 model of the iPad Pro was seen as a minor spec bump amongst tech reviewers. Although the addition in RAM and change in storage options were welcomed, the lidar sensor that Apple added for increased AR capability was touted as a feature only a few customers would use. Dieter Bohn from The Verge welcomed the new camera setup. However, he considered the device lacking as a tool for video conferencing. Bohn noted that even though most iPad users now use the device primarily in landscape mode in a keyboard case, Apple continues to place the front-facing camera on the device's short edge, a positioning more compatible with use in portrait mode. He added, "in iPadOS, Apple doesn't allow apps to use the camera unless they're active in the foreground. That's nice from a peace-of-mind perspective but absolutely terrible for video conferencing." Despite receiving an update to iPadOS, the 2020 model was planned to not receive one of the leading features, Stage Manager. This caused controversy as Apple provided inconclusive reasons as to why Stage Manager could not be supported. Due to criticism, a single-screen version of Stage Manager was added on 2018 and 2020 iPad Pros in iPadOS 16.1 Beta.

== Timeline ==
Timeline of iPad models
See also: List of Apple products

Source: Apple Newsroom Archive.

== See also ==
- Pen computing
- Graphics tablet
