= IPadOS version history =

List of iPadOS operating system versions

iPadOS is a mobile operating system for tablet computers developed by Apple Inc. It was first released as a modification of iOS starting with version 13.1 on September 24, 2019. Before the release of iPadOS, iPads were released with iPhone OS, which was later renamed to iOS. New iPadOS versions are released every year mostly in sync with iOS, tvOS, and watchOS.

== iPadOS version history ==
Overview of iPadOS versions
Version	Initial release date	Latest version	Latest release date	Device end-of-life			
Version	Initial release date	Latest version	Latest release date	iPad	Mini	Air	Pro
iPadOS 13	September 24, 2019	13.7	September 1, 2020	—N/a			
iPadOS 14	September 16, 2020	14.8.1	October 26, 2021	—N/a			
iPadOS 15	September 20, 2021	15.8.8	May 11, 2026	—N/a	4	2	—N/a
iPadOS 16	October 24, 2022	16.7.16	May 11, 2026	5th	—N/a		1st
iPadOS 17	September 18, 2023	17.7.11	May 11, 2026	6th	—N/a		2nd
iPadOS 18	September 16, 2024	18.7.10	August 17, 2026	7th	—N/a		
iPadOS 26	September 15, 2025	26.7.1	September 28, 2026	8th	5th	3rd	3rd
iPadOS 27	September 14, 2026	27.0.1	September 28, 2026	TBA			
iPadOS 27	September 14, 2026	27.2 beta 3	October 5, 2026	TBA			
Legend: Unsupported Supported Latest version Preview version

== Releases ==
=== iPadOS 13 ===
iPadOS 13 is the first major release of iPadOS, an iPad-specific fork of iOS meant to emphasize the multitasking and tablet-centric features of the iPad. It was previewed at Apple's WWDC 2019, and released on September 24, 2019 as 13.1. iPadOS version 13.0 was never publicly released, though beta testing for iPadOS 13 started with 13.0.

It added a dark mode for the interface, and Memoji support for iPads with the Apple A9 chips or more recent chips. New multitasking options were added that could display multiple applications simultaneously, including Split View and Slide Over. Apps gained multi-window support. These windows can be navigated using an interface similar to Mission Control on macOS. System-wide support for picture-in-picture was added. Safari gained new keyboard shortcuts and a download manager, and was set to display the desktop versions of websites by default, instead of the mobile version. A new feature, Sidecar, allows an iPad to function as a second monitor for Macs, which allows the Apple Pencil to be used with Mac applications. The Files app gained support for external drives, which can connect to an iPad with USB-C, or through the Lightning Camera Connection Kit for iPads with a Lightning port. Preliminary support for mice and trackpads was added to iPadOS 13, with full support added in iPadOS 13.4.

=== iPadOS 14 ===
iPadOS 14 was released on September 16, 2020. It added new widgets in the Today View, a shelf to the left of the first home screen. The standardized system interfaces for Siri and voice calling applications like Skype were shrunk to the size of notifications, to allow users to continue interacting with the open app. Spotlight search gained improved search suggestions and more detailed web search results. iPadOS 14 also added support for mounting encrypted APFS external hard drives.

=== iPadOS 15 ===
iPadOS 15 was released on September 20, 2021. It introduced an App Library, which automatically categorizes apps into one page, and also added the ability to place widgets on the home screen. Both features had previously only been available on the iPhone, with iOS 14. It also added a new multitasking user interface, with window controls to activate Split View, Slide Over, or full screen in one tap. Quick Notes allows users to create notes by swiping from the bottom right corner, from the Control Center, or with a keyboard shortcut. Tab Groups were added to Safari. iPadOS 15.4 added Universal Control: a user can use a Mac or iPad's keyboard and trackpad across all of their other Macs and iPads, by moving the mouse cursor past the edge of the screen in the direction of the other device.

=== iPadOS 16 ===
iPadOS 16 was released on October 24, 2022 as 16.1 instead of 16.0 (similar to how iPadOS 13 started off as version 13.1 instead of the usual 13.0). It included a new Weather app, Passkeys in Safari, and a new Stage Manager feature that enables more powerful multitasking. iPadOS 16.2 added the Freeform app, a digital whiteboard which can sync across Apple devices.

=== iPadOS 17 ===
iPadOS 17 was released on September 18, 2023. It allowed for customization for, and adding of wallpapers, with just a held tap on the Lock Screen.

=== iPadOS 18 ===
iPadOS 18 was released on September 16, 2024. It allowed users to change icons from Light mode to Dark mode, customize the home screen, lock screen and Control Centre and use Apple Intelligence. This update also introduces dynamic wallpapers that change with the time.

=== iPadOS 26 ===
IPadOS 26 was introduced on June 9, 2025, and it was released on September 15, 2025. It was first iPadOS version to use Apple's new year-based versioning scheme. It introduces Liquid Glass, the first major redesign of the operating system since iOS 7, based around the element of glass. The design language extends to all of Apple's other platforms, including iOS, macOS, watchOS, tvOS and visionOS, marking the first time Apple has used a unified design language across all of their operating systems.

=== iPadOS 27 ===
iPadOS 27 was introduced on June 8, 2026, and it was released on September 14, 2026. It announced advanced Apple Intelligence features, such as an enhanced Siri powered by Google Gemini.

== Hardware support ==
=== iPad ===
Supported iOS and iPadOS versions on the iPad
Model	iOS (Note: The OS was called "iPhone OS" for version 3.2.x only.)										iPadOS							
Model	3	4	5	6	7	8	9	10	11	12	13	14	15	16 (Note: iPadOS 16.0 was only available as a Beta, with version 16.1 being the first stable version.)	17	18	26	27
iPad (1st)	3.2	Supported	Supported	Unsupported	Unsupported	Unsupported	Unsupported	Unsupported	Unsupported	Unsupported	Unsupported	Unsupported	Unsupported	Unsupported	Unsupported	Unsupported	Unsupported	Unsupported
iPad 2	—N/a	4.3	Supported	Supported	Supported	Supported	Supported	Unsupported	Unsupported	Unsupported	Unsupported	Unsupported	Unsupported	Unsupported	Unsupported	Unsupported	Unsupported	Unsupported
iPad (3rd)	—N/a		5.1	Supported	Supported	Supported	Supported	Unsupported	Unsupported	Unsupported	Unsupported	Unsupported	Unsupported	Unsupported	Unsupported	Unsupported	Unsupported	Unsupported
iPad (4th)	—N/a			Supported	Supported	Supported	Supported	Supported	Unsupported	Unsupported	Unsupported	Unsupported	Unsupported	Unsupported	Unsupported	Unsupported	Unsupported	Unsupported
iPad (5th)	—N/a							10.2.1	Supported	Supported	Supported	Supported	Supported	Supported	Unsupported	Unsupported	Unsupported	Unsupported
iPad (6th)	—N/a								11.3	Supported	Supported	Supported	Supported	Supported	Supported	Unsupported	Unsupported	Unsupported
iPad (7th)	—N/a										13.1	Supported	Supported	Supported	Supported	Supported	Unsupported	Unsupported
iPad (8th)	—N/a											Supported	Supported	Supported	Supported	Supported	Supported	Unsupported
iPad (9th)	—N/a												Supported	Supported	Supported	Supported	Supported	Supported
iPad (10th)	—N/a													16.1	Supported	Supported	Supported	Supported
iPad (11th)	—N/a															18.3.1	Supported	Supported

=== iPad Mini ===
Supported iOS and iPadOS versions on the iPad Mini
Model	iOS							iPadOS							
Model	6	7	8	9	10	11	12	13	14	15	16	17	18	26	27
Mini (1st)	6.0.1	Supported	Supported	Supported	Unsupported	Unsupported	Unsupported	Unsupported	Unsupported	Unsupported	Unsupported	Unsupported	Unsupported	Unsupported	Unsupported
Mini 2	—N/a	7.0.3	Supported	Supported	Supported	Supported	Supported	Unsupported	Unsupported	Unsupported	Unsupported	Unsupported	Unsupported	Unsupported	Unsupported
Mini 3	—N/a		8.1	Supported	Supported	Supported	Supported	Unsupported	Unsupported	Unsupported	Unsupported	Unsupported	Unsupported	Unsupported	Unsupported
Mini 4	—N/a			Supported	Supported	Supported	Supported	Supported	Supported	Supported	Unsupported	Unsupported	Unsupported	Unsupported	Unsupported
Mini (5th)	—N/a						12.2	Supported	Supported	Supported	Supported	Supported	Supported	Supported	Unsupported
Mini (6th)	—N/a									Supported	Supported	Supported	Supported	Supported	Supported
Mini (7th)	—N/a												Supported	Supported	Supported

=== iPad Air ===
Supported iOS and iPadOS versions on the iPad Air
Model	iOS						iPadOS							
Model	7	8	9	10	11	12	13	14	15	16	17	18	26	27
Air (1st)	7.0.3	Supported	Supported	Supported	Supported	Supported	Unsupported	Unsupported	Unsupported	Unsupported	Unsupported	Unsupported	Unsupported	Unsupported
Air 2	—N/a	8.1	Supported	Supported	Supported	Supported	Supported	Supported	Supported	Unsupported	Unsupported	Unsupported	Unsupported	Unsupported
Air (3rd)	—N/a					12.2	Supported	Supported	Supported	Supported	Supported	Supported	Supported	Unsupported
Air (4th)	—N/a							14.1	Supported	Supported	Supported	Supported	Supported	Supported
Air (5th)	—N/a								15.4	Supported	Supported	Supported	Supported	Supported
Air (6th)	—N/a										17.4	Supported	Supported	Supported
Air (7th)	—N/a											18.3.1	Supported	Supported
Air (8th)	—N/a												26.3	Supported

=== iPad Pro ===
Supported iOS and iPadOS versions on the iPad Pro
Model	iOS				iPadOS							
Model	9	10	11	12	13	14	15	16	17	18	26	27
Pro (1st)	9.1 / 9.3 (Note: iOS 9.1 on iPad Pro 12.9" (2015). iOS 9.3 on iPad Pro 9.7" (2016).)	Supported	Supported	Supported	Supported	Supported	Supported	Supported	Unsupported	Unsupported	Unsupported	Unsupported
Pro (2nd)	—N/a	10.3.2	Supported	Supported	Supported	Supported	Supported	Supported	Supported	Unsupported	Unsupported	Unsupported
Pro (3rd)	—N/a			12.1	Supported	Supported	Supported	Supported	Supported	Supported	Supported	Unsupported
Pro (4th)	—N/a				13.4	Supported	Supported	Supported	Supported	Supported	Supported	Supported
Pro (5th)	—N/a					14.5	Supported	Supported	Supported	Supported	Supported	Supported
Pro (6th)	—N/a							16.1	Supported	Supported	Supported	Supported
Pro (7th)	—N/a								17.4	Supported	Supported	Supported
Pro (8th)	—N/a										Supported	Supported

== Timeline of iOS and derivative operating systems ==
Timeline of iOS and derivative operating systems

== See also ==
- List of iPad models
- iOS version history
- Issues relating to iOS
