= IPadOS 13 =

2019 tablet operating system by Apple

iPadOS 13

- iPadOS 13 home screen in "dark mode" running on an iPad Pro (3rd generation)
- Developer: Apple Inc.
- Written in: C, C++, Objective-C, Swift, assembly language
- OS family: Unix-like, based on Darwin (BSD), iOS
- Working state: No longer supported
- Source model: Closed with open-source components
- Initial release: September 24, 2019; 7 years ago
- Latest release: 13.7 (17H35) (September 1, 2020; 6 years ago) [±]
- Marketing target: Tablet computers
- Available in: 40 languages
- Update method: OTA, software update through iTunes or Finder
- Package manager: App Store
- Supported platforms: iPad, iPad Air, iPad Mini, iPad Pro
- Kernel type: Hybrid (XNU)
- Default user interface: Cocoa Touch (multi-touch, GUI)
- License: Proprietary software except for open-source components
- Preceded by: iOS 12
- Succeeded by: iPadOS 14
- Official website: iPadOS 13 at the Wayback Machine (archived September 11, 2020)
- Tagline: Incredibly capable. Distinctly iPad.

Support status
- Obsolete, unsupported since all iPads that support iPadOS 13 also support at least iPadOS 14 and 15. Partial third-party app support.

Articles in the series

iPadOS 13 is the first major release of the iPadOS mobile operating system developed by Apple Inc. for their iPad line of tablet computers. The successor to iOS 12 on those devices, it was announced at the company's 2019 Worldwide Developers Conference (WWDC) on June 3, 2019, as a derivation from iOS, with a greater emphasis on multitasking and tablet-centric features. It was released on September 24, 2019. It was succeeded by iPadOS 14, released on September 16, 2020.

== Overview ==
The first iPad was released in 2010 and ran iPhone OS 3.2, which added support for the larger device to the operating system, previously only used on the iPhone and iPod Touch. This shared operating system was rebranded as "iOS" with the release of iOS 4.

The operating system initially had rough feature parity running on the iPhone, iPod Touch, and iPad, with variations in user interface depending on screen size, and minor differences in the selection of apps included. However, over time, the variant of iOS for the iPad incorporated a growing set of differentiating features, such as picture-in-picture, the ability to display multiple running apps simultaneously (both introduced with iOS 9 in 2015), drag and drop, and a dock that more closely resembled the one in macOS than the one on the iPhone (added in 2017 with iOS 11). Standard iPad apps were increasingly designed to support the optional use of a keyboard.

To emphasize the different feature set available on the iPad, and to signal their intention to develop the platforms in divergent directions, at WWDC 2019 Apple announced that the variant of iOS that runs on the iPad would be rebranded as "iPadOS." The new naming strategy began with iPadOS 13.1, in 2019.

== Features ==
=== Home screen ===
Unlike previous versions of iOS, the icon grid displays up to five rows and six columns of apps (30), regardless of whether the device is in portrait or landscape orientation. The first page of the home screen can be configured to show a column of widgets from applications for easy access. Spotlight Search is no longer part of the widgets but can still be accessed by swiping down from the center of the home screen or pressing Command + Space on a connected keyboard.

=== Multitasking ===
iPadOS features a multitasking system developed with more capabilities compared to iOS, with features like Slide Over and Split View that make it possible to use multiple different applications simultaneously. Double-clicking the Home Button or swiping up from the bottom of the screen and pausing will display all currently active spaces. Each space can feature a single app, or a Split View featuring two apps. The user can also swipe left or right on the Home Indicator to go between spaces at any time, or swipe left/right with four fingers.

While using an app, swiping up slightly from the bottom edge of the screen will summon the Dock, where apps stored within can be dragged to different areas of the current space to be opened in either Split View or Slide Over. Dragging an app to the left or right edge of the screen will create a Split View, which will allow both apps to be used side by side. The size of the two apps in Split View can be adjusted by dragging a pill shaped icon in the center of the vertical divider and dragging the divider all the way to one side of the screen closes the respective app. If the user drags an app from the dock over the current app, it will create a floating window called Slide Over which can be dragged to either the left or right side of the screen. A Slide Over window can be hidden by swiping it off the right side of the screen, and swiping left from the right edge of the screen will restore it. Slide Over apps can also be cycled between by swiping left or right on the Home Indicator in the Slide Over window and pulling up on it will open an app switcher for Slide Over windows. A pill shaped icon at the top of apps in Split View or Slide Over allows them to be switched in an out of Split View and Slide Over.

The user can now have several instances of a single app open at once. A new mode similar to macOS's Mission Control has been added which allows the user to see all of the instances of an app.

In many applications, a notable exception being YouTube, videos can be shrunk down into a picture-in-picture window so the user can continue watching it while using other apps. This window containing the video can be resized by pinching and spreading and can be docked to any of the four corners of the screen. It can also be hidden by swiping it off the side of the screen and is denoted by an arrow at the edge where the video is hidden and swiping it will bring it back onscreen.

=== Safari ===
iPadOS Safari now shows desktop versions of websites by default, includes a download manager, and has 30 new keyboard shortcuts if an external keyboard is connected.

=== Sidecar ===
Sidecar allows for an iPad to function as a second monitor for macOS, named in reference to articulated motorcycles. When using Sidecar, the Apple Pencil can be used to emulate a graphics tablet for applications like Photoshop. This feature is supported only on iPads compatible with the Apple Pencil.

=== Storage ===
In addition to accessing local storage for general use, iPadOS allows external storage, such as USB flash drives, portable hard drives, and solid state drives to be connected to an iPad via the Files app. The iPad Pro (3rd generation) connects over USB-C, while the Lightning Camera Connection Kit can be used with previous iPads.

=== Mouse and trackpad support ===
Support for mice and trackpads was available since the first public release, albeit as an accessibility feature only. Complete support was added in version 13.4, which included multitouch gestures for trackpads, and allowed third-party apps to implement new features supporting mice and trackpads.

== Supported devices ==
iPadOS 13 supports iPads with an Apple A8 or A8X chip or later, dropping support for devices with the A7 chip, more specifically the first-generation iPad Air and the iPad Mini 2 and iPad Mini 3. iPadOS 13 (formerly iOS on iPad) is the first version to drop support for an iPad model with Touch ID — specifically, the iPad Mini 3. It also ends support for iPads without any biometric authentication — such as the iPad Air (1st gen) and iPad Mini 2 — both of which used the A7 chip and lacked both Touch ID and Face ID.

iPads with an A8 SoC have limited support.

iPads with an A8X SoC have additional features that are unavailable on A8 iPads.

iPads with an A9 or A9X SoC have partial support.

iPads with an A10, A10X, A12, A12X, or A12Z SoC have full support.

Devices supporting iPadOS 13 include:

- iPad Air 2
- iPad Air (3rd generation)
- iPad (5th generation)
- iPad (6th generation)
- iPad (7th generation)
- iPad Mini 4
- iPad Mini (5th generation)
- All iPad Pro models

An upgrade to iPadOS 13 is automatically offered to supported devices.

== Version history ==
The release of iPadOS 13 began with 13.1. 13.0 was never publicly released, though beta testing for iPadOS 13 started with 13.0.

Version	Build	Codename	Release date	Notes
13.1	17A844	Yukon	September 24, 2019	Initial release on iPad (7th generation): Introduces Dark Mode; Introduces "Sign in with Apple", allowing users to link accounts to their Apple ID; Introduces Apple Arcade; Integrates Siri and Shortcuts; Adds more Memoji customization options; Redesigns the CarPlay Dashboard; Adds custom fonts to the App Store; Enables external drive support in the Files app; Enables SMB support in the Files app; Enables extraction and compression of .zip archives; Adds "Allow Once" location permission; Redesigns volume control in the upper-left corner to be less unobtrusive; Adds 38 more keyboard languages; Adds Voice Control; Introduces Low Data Mode, to reduce data usage over cellular networks; Introduces Optimized Battery Charging, which learns from your charging behavior to only charge your device when you need it; Find My iPhone and Find My Friends are combined into one app; Split View and Slide Over allow showing multiple windows from the same app, such as showing two Safari windows at the same time; App Exposé allows viewing all windows from a specific app; Tapping on iPad's display with Apple Pencil opens the Markup screen; Apple Pencil latency has been reduced; The Home Screen app grid has been increased to 5x6 no matter the screen rotation; Today Widgets can be placed on the left side of Home Screen; QuickType allows shrinking the keyboard to view more screen area; Fixes a bug that caused a malicious iBooks file to cause persistent denial-of-service; Fixes a bug that allowed arbitrary code execution with kernel privileges; Fixes multiple issues in libxslt; Fixes a bug that allowed accessing Contacts on Lock Screen; Fixes two WebKit bugs that allowed arbitrary code execution; Fixes a bug that allows malicious websites to read browsing history
13.1.1	17A854	Yukon	September 27, 2019	Fixes an issue that prevented iPads from restoring from backups; Fixes an issue that caused high battery drain; Fixes an issue that caused abnormally slow sync speed for Reminders; Fixes an issue where Safari search suggestions may re-enable themselves after being disabled; Fixes a bug that prevented apps from receiving the correct sandbox restrictions
13.1.2	17A860	Yukon	September 30, 2019	Fixes a bug that caused the progress bar for iCloud Backup to continue to show after a backup completed; Fixes an issue that caused Shortcuts to not run properly from HomePod
13.1.3	17A878	Yukon	October 15, 2019	Fixes a bug that prevented opening a meeting invite in Mail; Fixes an issue that caused Voice Memos to not sync via iCloud Backup; Improves Bluetooth reliability for Bluetooth hearing aids and headsets; Improves launch performance for Game Center-enabled apps
13.2	17B84	YukonB	October 28, 2019	Allows opting out of and deletion of Siri and Dictation History; Announce Messages with Siri has been reintroduced; Deleting apps on Home Screen is now possible; The Rearrange Apps button has been renamed to Edit Home Screen; Adds over 70 new emoji; The Home App has been updated to support HomeKit Secure Video for security camera footage; Fixes a bug that prevented Password Autofill in third-party apps; Fixes a bug that caused the keyboard to not appear when using Spotlight Search; Fixes a bug that caused Messages to only send one notification if it was configured to send more; Fixes a bug that caused Markup annotations to not save; Fixes a bug that caused Notes to disappear; Fixes a bug that caused iCloud Backup to fail; Improves performance when using AssistiveTouch to open App Switcher; Fixes six bugs that allowed arbitrary code execution with kernel privileges; Fixes two WebKit bugs that allowed arbitrary code execution
13.2.2	17B102	YukonB	November 7, 2019	Fixes a bug that caused apps to quit if in the background; Fixes a bug that prevented charging on Lightning-powered YubiKey accessories
13.2.3	17B111	YukonB	November 18, 2019	Fixes a bug that caused Search in Settings, Mail, Files, and Notes to fail; Fixes a bug that prevented attachments in Messages to not display; Fixes a bug that caused Background App Refresh to fail; Fixes a bug that prevented Mail from fetching new emails
13.3	17C54	YukonC	December 10, 2019	Communication limits have been introduced for Screen Time; Screen Time can limit the contacts devices can call, FaceTime, or Message; Contacts can be managed to show a select list; Editing a video in Photos now has the option to save as new clip; Adds support for NFC, USB, and Lightning FIDO2-compliant security keys in Safari; Fixes an issue that caused the cursor to not move after long pressing the space bar; Fixes an issue that caused Markup to fail to save; Fixes an issue where the missed call badge on the Phone app failed to clear; Fixes a bug that caused the Cellular Data setting to incorrectly show as off; Improves wireless charging speed; Fixes a bug that caused Siri to initiate calls on the incorrect plan for dual SIM-equipped phones; Fixes a bug that allowed applications to elevate privileges; Fixes a bug that caused malicious FaceTime video to allow arbitrary code execution; Fixes four bugs that allowed arbitrary code execution with kernel privileges; Fixes bugs in libpcap; Fixes two WebKit bugs that allow arbitrary code execution
13.3.1	17D50	YukonD	January 28, 2020	Fixes a bug that allowed adding a contact to Communication Limits without entering Screen Time password, if applied; Fixed a bug that caused an excess of undo dialogs to appear in Mail; Fixes a bug that caused push notifications to fail to deliver over WiFi; Adds support for Indian English Siri voices for HomePod; Fixes nine bugs that allowed arbitrary code execution with kernel privileges; Fixes three bugs that allowed applications to read restricted memory; Fixes two bugs that allowed arbitrary code execution; Fixes a bug that caused FaceTime to display camera footage from the wrong camera; Fixes two bugs that allowed accessing Contacts on a device on Lock Screen; Fixes two WebKit bugs that allowed arbitrary execution
13.4	17E255	YukonE	March 24, 2020	Initial release on iPad Pro (4th generation): Adds nine new Memoji stickers; iCloud Drive folders can be shared from the Files app; Universal Purchase allows purchasing one app for use on multiple devices; CarPlay allows using third-party navigation apps; Predictive typing is now supported for Arabic; Mouse and Trackpads are now supported; Fixes a bug that caused Viewfinder in Camera to appear black; Fixes a bug that caused messages in Mail to appear out of order; Fixes a bug that caused abnormally low quality music to be streamed from Apple Music; Adds punctuation symbols to the Burmese keyboard; Fixes a sandbox escape; Fixes a bug that allowed applications to apply arbitrary entitlements to themselves; Fixes a bug that allowed applications to elevate privileges; Fixes three bugs that allowed arbitrary code execution with kernel privileges; Fixes issues in libxml2; Fixes a bug that allowed replying to Messages if that setting was disabled; Fixes a bug that caused Private Browsing activity to be saved in Screen Time; Fixes four WebKit bugs that allowed arbitrary code execution
13.4.1	17E262	YukonE	April 7, 2020	Fixes a bug that caused FaceTime calls to devices running iOS 9.3.6 or OS X El Capitan 10.11.6 and earlier to fail
13.5	17F75	YukonF	May 20, 2020	The passcode field is automatically presented on iPads with Face ID if the user is wearing a mask; Fixes a bug that caused a black screen to appear when attempting to stream video from some websites; Fixes two audio bugs that allowed arbitrary code execution; Fixes a bug that allowed a remote attacker to modify a device's filesystem; Fixes two image bugs that allowed arbitrary code execution; Fixes five bugs that allowed arbitrary code execution with kernel privileges; Fixes a sandbox bug that allowed applications to bypass Privacy preferences; Fixes a privilege escalation bug; Fixes seven WebKit bugs that allowed arbitrary code execution
13.5.1	17F80	YukonF	June 1, 2020	Patches a bug that allowed the unc0ver jailbreak to work
13.6	17G68	YukonG	July 15, 2020	Adds support for narrated News stories with an Apple News+ subscription; Adds a toggle to automatically download updates when on WiFi; Fixes a bug that caused calls originating from Saskatchewan to display as from the US; Fixes a bug that prevented iPhone 6s, iPhone 6s Plus, and iPhone SE (1st generation) from enabling WiFi calling; Improves Control Center stability when AssistiveTouch is enabled; Fixes a bug that caused Japanese hardware keyboards to map as US keyboards; Allows administrators of devices enrolled in MDM to specify domains that are excluded from the MDM-mandated VPN; Fixes ten bugs that allowed arbitrary code execution; Fixes many issues in openEXR; Fixes six bugs that allowed arbitrary code execution as kernel privileges; Fixes a bug that allowed applications with code execution as kernel to bypass PPL; Fixes a bug in libxml2 that allowed arbitrary code execution; Patches two sandbox escapes; Fixes a WebKit bug that allowed bypassing PAC; Fixes a WebKit bug that allowed address bar spoofing; Fixes two WebKit bugs that allowed kernel memory corruption; Fixes a WebKit bug that allowed arbitrary code execution
13.6.1	17G80	YukonG	August 12, 2020	Fixes a bug that caused unneeded system files to not be deleted if system storage is low; Fixes an issue that caused some displays to have a green tint
13.7	17H35	YukonH	September 1, 2020	Unknown

== Reception ==
The reception of iPadOS 13 was a historic turning point, due to its desktop-class Safari, improved file management, enhanced multitasking, mouse support and the all-new Dark Mode. However, it was criticized for being unstable at launch, lacking multi-user support, having an overly complex learning curve and limited compatibility.

== See also ==
- iOS 13
- macOS Catalina
- SwiftUI

Preceded by iOS 12	iPadOS 13; 2019	Succeeded by iPadOS 14
