= IPadOS 14 =

2020 tablet operating system by Apple

iPadOS 14

- The iPadOS 14 home screen running on the 7th-generation iPad
- Developer: Apple
- Written in: C, C++, Objective-C, Swift, assembly language
- OS family: Unix-like, based on Darwin (BSD), iOS
- Working state: No longer supported
- Source model: Closed with open-source components
- General availability: September 16, 2020; 6 years ago
- Latest release: 14.8.1 (18H107) (October 26, 2021; 5 years ago) [±]
- Marketing target: Tablet computers
- Available in: 40 languages
- Update method: OTA, software update through iTunes or Finder
- Package manager: App Store
- Supported platforms: See below
- Kernel type: Hybrid (XNU)
- Default user interface: Cocoa Touch (multi-touch, GUI)
- License: Proprietary software except for open-source components
- Preceded by: iPadOS 13
- Succeeded by: iPadOS 15
- Official website: iPadOS 14 at the Wayback Machine (archived September 12, 2021)
- Tagline: Looks brand new. Feels like home.

Support status
- Obsolete, unsupported since all iPads that support iPadOS 14 also support at least iPadOS 15. Partial third-party app support.

Articles in the series

iPadOS 14 is the second major release of the iPadOS operating system developed by Apple for their iPad line of tablet computers. It was announced on June 22, 2020, at the company's Worldwide Developers Conference (WWDC) as the successor to iPadOS 13, making it the second version of the iPadOS fork from iOS. It was released to the public on September 16, 2020. It was succeeded by iPadOS 15 on September 20, 2021.

== Features ==
=== Home screen ===
==== Widgets ====
To the left of the first page, the Today View now has new redesigned widgets. Widgets may be added, with options for small, medium, or large widgets, but the widgets can no longer collapse or expand. Widgets of the same size may be stacked over each other and swiped between for convenience; a Smart Stack may be placed which automatically show the most relevant widget to the user based on the time of day. Unlike in iOS 14, widgets cannot be placed directly on to the home screen in iPadOS 14; this was only allowed starting in iPadOS 15.

=== Compact UI ===
A series of changes were made in iPadOS 14 to reduce the visual space taken by previously full-screen interfaces; such interfaces now appear and hover in front of an app, allowing for touch (and therefore multitasking) on the app behind. Voice calling interfaces, including Phone, or other third-party apps such as Skype, are made substantially thinner, taking approximately as much space as a notification. Siri's interface is now also compact.

=== Search and Siri ===
Improvements to the Search feature on the home screen were made, including a refined UI, quick launcher for apps, more detailed web search, shortcuts to in-app search, and improved as-you-type search suggestions. The search function now appears and functions more like the Spotlight Search feature of macOS.

In addition to being made compact, Siri can now answer a broader set of questions and translate more languages. Users can also share their ETA with contacts and ask for cycling directions.

=== Storage ===
iPadOS 14 gains the ability to mount encrypted external drives. However, this capability is limited to APFS-encrypted drives. Upon connecting an APFS-encrypted external drive to the USB-C port on the iPad, the Files app will present the external drive on the sidebar. Selecting the drive will prompt the user to enter the password to unlock the drive.

== Supported devices ==
All iPads that supported iPadOS 13 also support iPadOS 14.

iPads with an A8 SoC have limited support.

iPads with an A8X SoC have additional features that are unavailable on A8 iPads.

iPads with an A9 or A9X SoC have partial support.

iPads with an A10, A10X, A12, A12X, A12Z, A14, or M1 SoC have full support.

- iPad Air 2
- iPad Air (3rd generation)
- iPad Air (4th generation)
- iPad (5th generation)
- iPad (6th generation)
- iPad (7th generation)
- iPad (8th generation)
- iPad Mini 4
- iPad Mini (5th generation)
- iPad Pro (all models)

== Version history ==
The first developer beta of iPadOS 14 was released on June 22, 2020, and the first public beta was released on July 9, 2020. iPadOS 14 was officially released on September 16, 2020. There was no public beta testing of 14.1.

Version	Codename	Build	Release date	Notes
14.0	Azul	18A373	September 16, 2020	Initial release, initial release for the iPad (8th generation) and the iPad Air (4th generation)
14.0.1	Azul	18A393	September 24, 2020	Bug fixes, including for an issue that could cause default browser and mail settings to reset after restarting the device
14.1	Azul	18A8395	October 20, 2020	Improvements and bug fixes: Adds support for 10-bit HDR video playback and editing in Photos for iPad Pro 12.9‑inch (2nd generation) and later, iPad Pro 11-inch, iPad Pro 10.5 inch, iPad Air (3rd generation) and later, and iPad Mini (5th generation); Addresses an issue where some widgets, folders, and icons were showing up in reduced size on the Home Screen; Fixes an issue where some emails in Mail were sent from an incorrect alias; Addresses an issue where some users were occasionally unable to download or add songs to their library while viewing an album or playlist, resolves an issue where streaming video resolution could temporarily be reduced at the start of playback; Addresses an issue in the Files app that could cause some MDM-managed cloud service providers to incorrectly display content as unavailable
14.2	AzulB	18B92	November 5, 2020	Introduces a Shazam toggle in Control Center, revamped media controls, face detection in the Magnifier app, over 100 new emoji and eight new wallpapers in dark and light mode
14.3	AzulC	18C66	December 14, 2020	New Apple TV UI; Apple Fitness+ support for final release
14.4	AzulD	18D52	January 26, 2021	Added a prompt asking user to allow apps to track them; Added the "Perspective Zoom" option to the set wallpaper block in shortcuts
14.4.1	AzulD	18D61	March 8, 2021	Security fixes
14.4.2	AzulD	18D70	March 26, 2021	Security fixes
14.5	AzulE	18E199	April 26, 2021	UI tweaks for the Podcasts app: New interface for typing with Siri and sending messages with Siri; Support for using the Xbox Series S/X and PlayStation 5 controllers; New UI for Software Update in Settings; Full release date for songs in Apple Music; App Tracking Transparency goes live; 2 new/improved Siri voices; New emoji characters
14.5.1	AzulE	18E212	May 3, 2021	Security fixes
14.6	AzulF	18F72	May 24, 2021	Bug fixes: Supports Apple Card Family and Podcasts subscriptions
14.7	AzulG	18G69; 18G70 (Note: iPad (8th generation) (Wi-Fi + Cellular) and iPad Air (4th generation) (Wi-Fi + Cellular) only)	July 21, 2021	Bug fixes
14.7.1	AzulG	18G82	July 26, 2021	Bug fixes
14.8	AzulH	18H17	September 13, 2021	Security fixes
14.8.1	AzulH	18H107	October 26, 2021	Security fixes

== Reception ==
Reception of iPadOS 14 was positive; it was praised for the addition of Scribble and Sidebars in Apps, a compact UI and improved universal search, but criticized for its widget limitations, stagnant multitasking and missing App Library.

Preceded by iPadOS 13	iPadOS 14; 2020	Succeeded by iPadOS 15
