= IPad Mini (5th generation) =

2019 tablet computer by Apple

iPad Mini (5th generation)

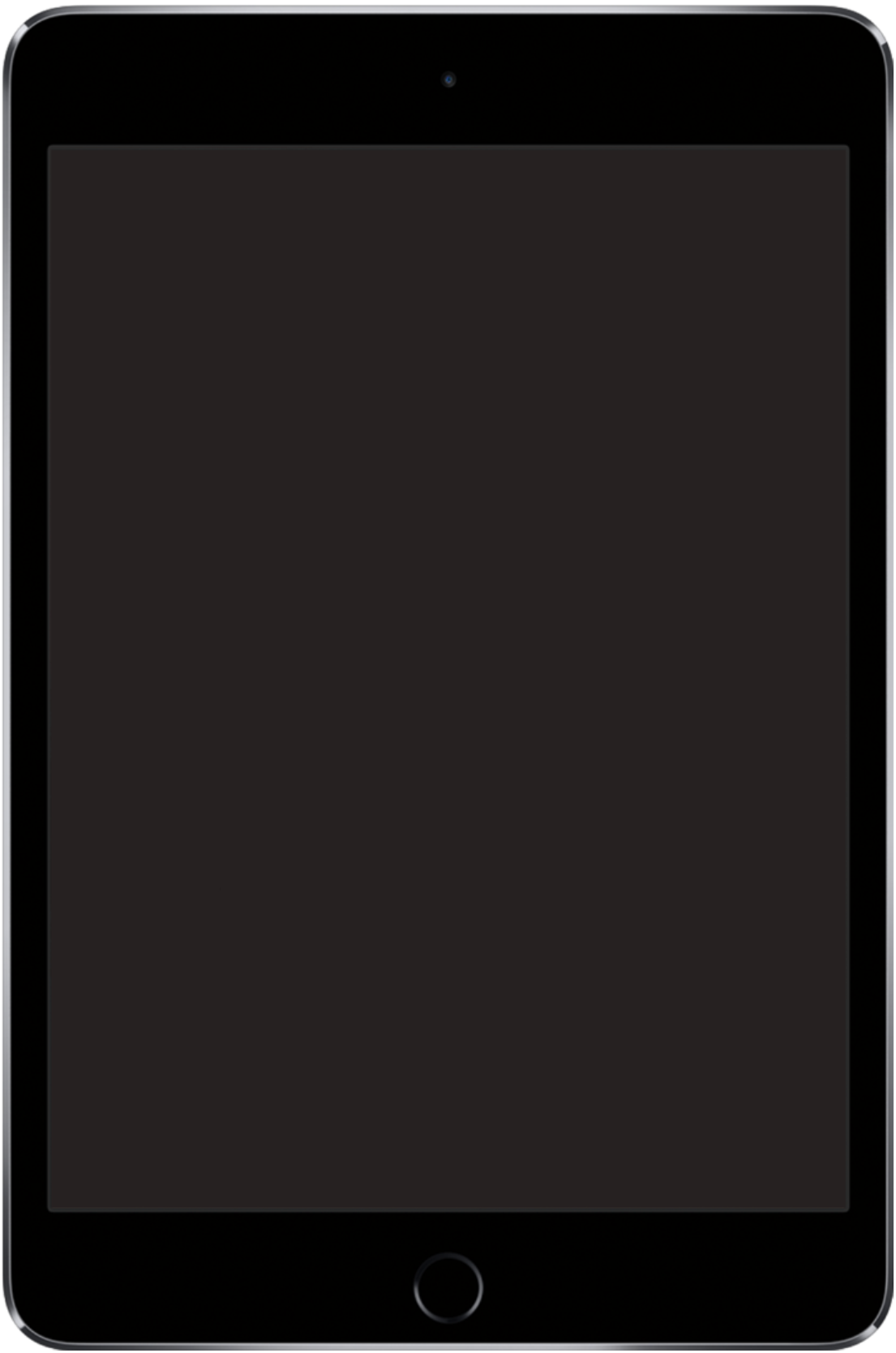
- An iPad Mini 5 with black bezels
- Also known as: iPad Mini 5
- Developer: Apple Inc.
- Manufacturer: Foxconn
- Product family: iPad Mini
- Type: Tablet computer
- Generation: 5th
- Released: March 18, 2019; 7 years ago
- Introductory price: $399 USD £399 GBP $569 AUD $529 CAD €459 EUR
- Discontinued: September 14, 2021; 5 years ago
- Operating system: Original: iOS 12.2; Current: iPadOS 26.7.2, released October 26, 2026
- System on a chip: Apple A12 Bionic with 64-bit architecture and Apple M12 motion co-processor
- CPU: 2.49 GHz Hexa-core (2 × high performance Vortex + 4 × high efficiency Tempest)
- Memory: 3 GB LPDDR4X RAM
- Storage: 64 or 256 GB flash memory
- Display: 7.9 inches (200 mm) 2048×1536 px (326 ppi) IPS LCD 500-nits Max Brightness, Wide-Color Display (P3), True Tone Display, Fully Laminated Display, 1.8% Reflectivity and Apple Pencil (1st Generation) Support with a 4:3 aspect ratio and antireflective coating
- Sound: Stereo (both at bottom)
- Input: Multi-touch screen, headset controls, M12 motion co-processor, proximity and ambient light sensors, 3-axis accelerometer, 3-axis gyroscope, digital compass, dual microphone, Touch ID fingerprint reader, barometer
- Camera: Front: 7 MP, 1080p Back: 8 MP, 1080p
- Connectivity: Wi-Fi and Wi-Fi + Cellular: Wi-Fi 802.11 a/b/g/n/ac at 2.4 GHz and 5 GHz and MIMO Bluetooth 5.0 Wi-Fi + Cellular: GPS & GLONASS GSM UMTS/HSDPA 850, 1700, 1900, 2100 MHz GSM/EDGE 850, 900, 1800, 1900 MHz LTE Multiple bands A2124: 1, 2, 3, 4, 5, 7, 8, 11, 12, 13, 14, 17, 18, 19, 20, 21, 25, 26, 28, 29, 30, 66, and TD-LTE 34, 38, 39, 40, 41, 46 A2126: 1, 2, 3, 4, 5, 7, 8, 11, 12, 13, 14, 17, 18, 19, 20, 21, 25, 26, 29, 30, 66, 71 and TD-LTE 34, 38, 39, 40, 41, 46)
- Power: 3.82 V 19.32 W·h (5124 mA·h)
- Online services: App Store, iTunes Store, iBookstore, iCloud, Game Center
- Dimensions: Height: 203.2 mm (8.00 in); Width: 134.8 mm (5.31 in); Depth: 6.1 mm (0.24 in)
- Weight: Wi-Fi: 300.5 g (0.662 lb); Wi-Fi + Cellular: 308.2 g (0.679 lb)
- Predecessor: iPad Mini 4
- Successor: iPad Mini (6th generation)
- Related: iPad Air (3rd generation) iPad (8th generation)
- Website: iPad mini - Apple at the Wayback Machine (archived September 13, 2021)

The fifth-generation iPad Mini (stylized and marketed as iPad mini and colloquially referred to as iPad Mini 5) is a tablet computer in the iPad Mini line, developed and marketed by Apple Inc. Announced in a press release along with the third-generation iPad Air on March 18, 2019, and released the same day. Its predecessor, the iPad Mini 4, was discontinued on the same day.

It shares a similar design to the iPad Mini 4 and features the Apple A12 Bionic chip, 64 or 256GB storage, a more modernly upgraded 7.9-inch Retina Display with support for Apple Pencil (1st Generation), True Tone display and Bluetooth 5.0. iFixit's teardown shows this iPad Mini is equipped with an upgraded 3GB of LPDDR4X RAM, the same as the iPhone XR.

The iPad Mini 5, iPad (9th generation) and the iPad Air 3 were the last iPad models to use a Lightning port and a home button. The iPad Mini 5 was discontinued on September 14, 2021, with the announcement of the iPad Mini (6th generation).

== Features ==
=== Hardware ===
The dimensions of the fifth-generation iPad Mini are nearly identical to the iPad Mini 4.

It was available in three color options - Silver, Space Gray and Gold.

It features the upgraded front camera system of the 7MP (1080p) camera used since 2016 starting with the iPhone 7 and continued with the iPhone XS, while the rear camera system continues with the older 8MP (1080p) used since the iPad Air 2 in 2014, as such, it cannot record in 4K video. The iPad Mini uses a Lightning port and has a headphone jack. It has a True Tone display, which allows the LCD to adapt to ambient lighting to change its color and intensity in different environments. It also has a wide color display (Display P3 color gamut), which means it can shows more vibrant color compared to the previous generation. The iPad Mini 5 includes a Touch ID home button.

The Apple A12 Bionic chip powering the fifth-generation iPad Mini has a 66% higher clock speed than its predecessor, which had a 1.5 GHz dual-core processor; (the Apple A8 in the previous generation was clocked higher than in the iPhone 6). The Apple A12 Bionic chip has a 2.49 GHz six-core processor. The fifth-generation iPad Mini is 3 × faster than the iPad Mini 4, and supports Apple Pencil (1st Generation).

=== Reception ===
The Verge rated the Mini 5 as an 8.5 out of 10, praising that it has the same specs as the larger iPad Air and had solid performance while noting that it had a "seven-year-old exterior design with huge bezels" and uses a Lightning port instead of USB-C.

=== Software ===
The fifth generation iPad Mini was supplied iOS 12.2, It received iPadOS 13 on September 24, 2019, iPadOS 14 on September 16, 2020, iPadOS 15 on September 20, 2021, iPadOS 16 on October 24, 2022, iPadOS 17 on September 18, 2023. iPadOS 18 on September 16, 2024, and iPadOS 26 on September 15, 2025.

== Timeline ==
Timeline of iPad models
See also: List of Apple products

Source: Apple Newsroom Archive.

Preceded by iPad Mini 4	iPad Mini (5th generation); 2019	Succeeded by iPad Mini (6th generation)
