= IPadOS 16 =

2022 tablet operating system by Apple

iPadOS 16
- Version of the iPadOS operating system

- iPadOS 16 running on an iPad Pro (4th generation)
- Developer: Apple
- OS family: Unix-like, based on Darwin (BSD), iOS
- Working state: No longer supported
- Source model: Closed with open-source components
- General availability: October 24, 2022; 4 years ago
- Latest release: 16.7.16 (May 11, 2026; 5 months ago) [±]
- Marketing target: Tablet computers
- Available in: 40 languages
- Update method: OTA, software update through iTunes, Apple Configurator, or Finder
- Package manager: App Store
- Supported platforms: iPad, iPad Air, iPad Mini, iPad Pro
- Kernel type: Hybrid (XNU)
- Default user interface: Cocoa Touch (multi-touch, GUI)
- License: Proprietary software with open-source components
- Preceded by: iPadOS 15
- Succeeded by: iPadOS 17
- Official website: iPadOS 16 at the Wayback Machine (archived November 22, 2022)
- Tagline: Incredibly capable. Unmistakably iPad.

Support status
- Obsolete, unsupported

Articles in the series

iPadOS 16 is the fourth major release of the iPadOS operating system developed by Apple for its iPad line of tablet computers. The successor to iPadOS 15, it was announced at the company's Worldwide Developers Conference (WWDC) on June 6, 2022, along with iOS 16, macOS Ventura, watchOS 9, and tvOS 16. It received numerous new features, improving multitasking and many other aspects of the operating system, most notably on iPads with Apple's M1 SoC and later.

The public beta of iPadOS 16 was released on July 11, 2022. The public version of iPadOS 16 was released on October 24, 2022 as iPadOS 16.1.

iPadOS 16 is the final version of iPadOS that supports the first-generation iPad Pro and iPads without Apple Pencil compatibility, especially the fifth-generation iPad.

== Features ==
=== Freeform ===
Freeform is a whiteboard app that lets users collaborate together in real time. It was released with iPadOS 16.2.

=== Weather ===
For the first time, Apple's Weather app is available on the iPad. It was originally only available on the iPhone and iPod Touch. It became publicly available on October 24, 2022.

=== Lock screen ===
The date and time on the lock screen have bold text and display the date above the time to match iOS 16, but lacks the customization features, which were later added in iPadOS 17.

=== Passkeys ===
iPads are able to sign into websites that implement WebAuthn using just the user’s passcode or biometrics.

=== Stage Manager ===
On iPads with Apple A12X Bionic, Apple A12Z Bionic, Apple M1 and Apple M2 processors, Stage Manager displays up to four apps at a time in adjustable windows. In addition, on iPads with Apple M1 and later, external displays are now driven using Stage Manager instead of screen mirroring, enabling display scaling on external displays.

=== Display scaling mode ===
On iPads with Apple M1 processors and later, and iPad Pro 11-inch with Apple A12X Bionic and A12Z Bionic processors, Display scaling mode allows more view space in apps by increasing the pixel density of the display.

=== Reference Mode ===
On the iPad Pro 12.9-inch (5th generation) and (6th generation) with Liquid Retina XDR display, the iPad can be used in "Reference Mode" for color-graded work. This extends to Sidecar, as long as the Mac being connected to has Apple Silicon.

=== Spoken Content ===
As with iOS 16, some already supported languages have received additional voices (including "Novelty" voices for English), and voices and support have been added for the following languages:

- Bangla
- Basque
- Bhojpuri
- Bulgarian
- Catalan
- Croatian
- Galician
- Kannada
- Malay
- Marathi
- Persian
- Shanghainese
- Slovenian
- Tamil
- Telugu
- Ukrainian
- Vietnamese

=== Notes ===
More text indentation features are added, as well as the ability to create column tables.

=== Files ===
Allows the changing of file extensions and showing all file extensions.

=== Photos ===
- Touch ID, Face ID or passcode is now required to view the Hidden and Recently Deleted albums, unless the user turns this off in Settings.
- Photos can now detect duplicate photos or videos. The user can choose to delete the duplicates or to merge them, so that the device retains the higher quality photo with relevant data from the duplicate(s).

=== App toolbar ===
Allows the customisation of toolbars to add tools, as well as editing the position of tools.

== Criticism ==
iPadOS 16's Stage Manager feature has been criticized by various sources for only being supported by certain iPad models with an M1 chip or M2 chip owing to strict performance requirements. In an interview with TechCrunch, Craig Federighi explained: “It’s only the M1 iPads that combined the high DRAM capacity with very high capacity, high-performance NAND that allows our virtual memory swap to be super fast”. It was later discovered that the feature is disabled for older devices by an internal setting. Due to criticism, a single-screen version of Stage Manager was added on 2018 and 2020 iPad Pros in iPadOS 16.1 beta. Apple later provided a statement to Engadget, stating that “…customers with iPad Pro 3rd and 4th generation have expressed strong interest in being able to experience Stage Manager on their iPads. In response, our teams have worked hard to find a way to deliver a single-screen version for these systems, with support for up to four live apps on the iPad screen at once”.

External display support for Stage Manager on M1 iPads was delayed until further notice by Apple due to instability, and was brought back in the iPadOS 16.2 update.

Stage Manager was also criticized for being "hard to use" and some reviewers and critics called the feature "fundamentally misguided".

The lack of iOS 16's lock screen customization features was also criticized by reviewers such as David Pierce from The Verge. iPadOS had a hidden lock screen customization app named PosterBoard which included the iOS 16’s lock screen customization features in iPadOS 16 Beta 1.

== Supported devices ==
iPadOS 16 requires iPads with an A9 or A9X SoC or later, and drops support for the iPad Air 2 and iPad Mini 4, which include an A8X and A8 chip, respectively. This also marks the second time Apple has dropped support for older 64-bit iPads. The iPad (5th generation) is the only supported iPad without Apple Pencil support. Alongside dropping support for the iPad Mini 4, the iPad Mini (5th generation) is the only supported iPad with the exclusive 7.9-inch display.

iPads with an A9 or A9X SoC have limited support. iPads with an A10 or A10X SoC get additional features that are unavailable on older iPads.

iPads with an A12, A13, A14, or A15 SoC has partial support.

iPads with an A12X or A12Z has almost full support.

iPads with an M-series SoC have full support.

iPads that support iPadOS 16 are as follows.

- iPad (5th generation) or later
- iPad Air (3rd generation) or later
- iPad Mini (5th generation) or later
- iPad Pro 12.9-inch (all models)
- iPad Pro 9.7-inch
- iPad Pro 10.5-inch (2nd generation)
- iPad Pro 11-inch (all models)

== Version history ==
The first developer beta of iPadOS 16 was released on June 6, 2022. The first public release, iPadOS 16.1, was officially released on October 24, 2022.

iPadOS 16 releases
Version	Release date
16.1	October 24, 2022
16.1.1	November 9, 2022
16.2	December 13, 2022
16.3	January 23, 2023
16.3.1	February 13, 2023
16.4	March 27, 2023
16.4.1	April 7, 2023
16.4.1 (a)	May 1, 2023
16.5	May 18, 2023
16.5.1	June 21, 2023
16.5.1 (a)	July 10, 2023 (pulled after 10 hours)
16.5.1 (b)	
16.5.1 (c)	July 12, 2023
16.6	July 24, 2023
16.6.1	September 7, 2023
16.7	September 21, 2023
16.7.1	October 10, 2023
16.7.2	October 25, 2023
16.7.3 (Note: Only available for devices not supported by iPadOS 17: iPad (5th generation), iPad Pro (12.9-inch, 1st generation) and iPad Pro (9.7-inch))	December 11, 2023
16.7.4	December 19, 2023
16.7.5	January 22, 2024
16.7.6	March 5, 2024
16.7.7	March 21, 2024
16.7.8	May 13, 2024
16.7.9	July 29, 2024
16.7.10	August 7, 2024
16.7.11	March 31, 2025
16.7.12	September 15, 2025
16.7.13	January 26, 2026
16.7.14	February 2, 2026
16.7.15	March 11, 2026
16.7.16	May 11, 2026
Legend: Unsupported Latest version Preview version

See Apple's official release notes, and official security update contents.

Preceded by iPadOS 15	iPadOS 16; 2022	Succeeded by iPadOS 17
