= A1601 =

A1601 may refer to:

- iPad Mini 3, a tablet computer
- Oppo F1s, a mobile phone
