= IPadOS 15 =

2021 tablet operating system by Apple

iPadOS 15
- Version of the iPadOS operating system

- iPadOS 15 running on an iPad mini (6th generation)
- Developer: Apple
- Written in: C, C++, Objective-C, Swift, assembly language
- OS family: Unix-like, based on Darwin (BSD), iOS
- Working state: No longer supported
- Source model: Closed with open-source components
- General availability: September 20, 2021; 5 years ago
- Latest release: 15.8.8 (May 11, 2026; 5 months ago) [±]
- Marketing target: Tablet computers
- Available in: 40 languages
- Update method: OTA, software update through iTunes, Apple Configurator, or Finder
- Package manager: App Store
- Supported platforms: See below
- Kernel type: Hybrid (XNU)
- Default user interface: Cocoa Touch (multi-touch, GUI)
- License: Proprietary software with open-source components
- Preceded by: iPadOS 14
- Succeeded by: iPadOS 16
- Official website: www.apple.com/ipados/ipados-15/ at the Wayback Machine (archived October 18, 2022)
- Tagline: Works wonders. With ease.

Support status
- Obsolete, unsupported

Articles in the series

iPadOS 15 is the third major release of the iPadOS operating system developed by Apple for its iPad line of tablet computers. The successor to iPadOS 14, it was announced at the company's Worldwide Developers Conference (WWDC) on June 7, 2021 along with iOS 15, macOS Monterey, watchOS 8, and tvOS 15. It was released to the public on September 20, 2021. It was succeeded by iPadOS 16, which was released on October 24, 2022.

iPadOS 15 is the final version of iPadOS that supports the iPad Air 2 and the iPad Mini 4.

== Features ==
=== Home screen ===
The home screen grid is reduced by one row to accommodate the new widgets when placed (24 icons), and rotates in portrait orientation, just like iOS 12 and earlier.

==== Widgets ====
Widgets can now be placed directly anywhere on the home screen. There are more widgets, many of which now have a new fourth size to pick from, being extra-large.

==== App Library ====
iPadOS 15 introduces the App Library from the iPhone in iOS 14 to the iPad.

=== Multitasking ===
New multitasking user interface allows users to enter split view, slide over, enter full screen with quick gestures. The multi window shelf gives quick access to all running apps.

=== Quick Note ===
A new feature, called Quick Note, can be taken by swiping from the corner with fingers or the Apple Pencil, the Control Center or a keyboard shortcut.

=== Safari ===
Safari has been redesigned, as in iOS 15 and macOS Monterey. Safari has tab groups which allow the user to organize tabs into user-defined groups. Users can download third party extensions for Safari in the App Store.

=== Other ===
- Universal Control allows a user to use a single keyboard and mouse across different Macs and iPads and new keyboard shortcuts have been added in iPadOS 15.4.
- The Translate app is now available in iPadOS 15.
- The iPadOS 13 default wallpapers were removed in the first beta of iPadOS 15.
- iPadOS 15 features a new wallpaper in two modes: light and dark.
- All models of iPad now have a "Low Power Mode" option in Settings, like the iOS "Low Power Mode" option in Settings, and can also be added to the Control Center.
- Supports Live Text in iPads with A12 Bionic or later.
- Introduces Focus mode, as in iOS 15 and macOS Monterey.
- The Today View has been removed and replaced by widgets placed directly anywhere on the home screen.

== Supported devices ==
All iPads that supported iPadOS 13 and iPadOS 14 also support iPadOS 15.

- iPad Air 2
- iPad Air (3rd generation)
- iPad Air (4th generation)
- iPad Air (5th generation)
- iPad (5th generation)
- iPad (6th generation)
- iPad (7th generation)
- iPad (8th generation)
- iPad (9th generation)
- iPad Mini 4
- iPad Mini (5th generation)
- iPad Mini (6th generation)
- iPad Pro (all models)

== Version history ==
The first developer beta of iPadOS 15 was released on June 7, 2021, and the first public beta was released on June 30, 2021, six days after the release of the second developer beta. The second public beta was released on July 16, 2021. iPadOS 15 was officially released on September 20, 2021.

iPadOS 15 releases
Version	Release date
15.0	September 20, 2021
15.0.1	October 1, 2021
15.0.2	October 11, 2021
15.1	October 25, 2021
15.2	December 13, 2021
15.2.1	January 12, 2022
15.3	January 26, 2022
15.3.1	February 10, 2022
15.4	March 14, 2022
15.4.1	March 31, 2022
15.5	May 16, 2022
15.6	July 20, 2022
15.6.1	August 17, 2022
15.7	September 12, 2022
15.7.1	October 27, 2022
15.7.2	December 13, 2022
15.7.3 (Note: Only available for devices not supported by iPadOS 16: iPad Air 2; iPad Mini 4)	January 23, 2023
15.7.4	March 27, 2023
15.7.5	April 10, 2023
15.7.7	June 21, 2023
15.7.8	July 24, 2023
15.7.9	September 11, 2023
15.8	October 25, 2023
15.8.1	January 22, 2024
15.8.2	March 5, 2024
15.8.3	July 29, 2024
15.8.4	March 31, 2025
15.8.5	September 15, 2025
15.8.6	January 26, 2026
15.8.7	March 11, 2026
15.8.8	May 11, 2026

== Reception ==
Reception of iPadOS 15 was positive; it was praised for the flexible widgets and App Library, simplified multitasking, the addition of Quick Note, Universal Control and Swift Playgrounds 4, but criticized for its stagnant multitasking, lack of desktop-class gaps and complex features.

== Notes ==
Preceded by iPadOS 14	iPadOS 15; 2021	Succeeded by iPadOS 16
