= IPhone XR =

Smartphone by Apple

iPhone XR

- iPhone XR in Blue
- Developer: Apple
- Manufacturer: Foxconn (on contract)
- Type: Smartphone
- Generation: 12th
- First released: October 26, 2018; 8 years ago
- Availability by region: October 26, 2018: Andorra; Australia; Austria; Bahrain; Belgium; Bosnia and Herzegovina; Bulgaria; Canada; China; Croatia; Cyprus; Czech Republic; Denmark; Egypt; Estonia; Finland; France; Germany; Greece; Greenland; Guernsey; Hong Kong; Hungary; Iceland; India; Ireland; Isle of Man; Italy; Japan; Jersey; Kuwait; Latvia; Liechtenstein; Lithuania; Luxembourg; Malaysia; Malta; Morocco; Mexico; Monaco; Netherlands; New Zealand; Norway; Oman; Poland; Portugal; Qatar; Romania; Russia; Saudi Arabia; Somalia; Serbia; Singapore; Slovakia; Slovenia; South Africa; Spain; Sweden; Switzerland; Taiwan; Thailand; United Arab Emirates; United Kingdom; United States; November 1, 2018: Israel; November 2, 2018: Armenia; Azerbaijan; Bhutan; Brunei; Cambodia; Georgia; Kazakhstan; Macau; Maldives; Myanmar; South Korea; Ukraine; Vietnam; November 9, 2018: Belarus; Brazil; Colombia; Nigeria; November 16, 2018: Philippines; November 30, 2018: Turkey; December 14, 2018: Indonesia
- Discontinued: September 14, 2021; 5 years ago
- Predecessor: iPhone 8 / iPhone 8 Plus
- Successor: iPhone 11
- Related: iPhone XS / iPhone XS Max
- Compatible networks: GSM, CDMA2000, EV-DO, HSPA+, 3G, LTE, LTE Advanced
- Form factor: Slate
- Dimensions: 150.9 × 75.7 × 8.3 mm (5.94 × 2.98 × 0.33 in)
- Weight: 194 g (6.8 oz)
- Operating system: Original: iOS 12; Current: iOS 18.7.11, released October 26, 2026
- System-on-chip: Apple A12 Bionic
- Memory: 3 GB LPDDR4X
- Storage: 64, 128, or 256 GB NVMe
- Battery: 3.81 V 11.21 W·h (2942 mAh) Li-ion
- Rear camera: 12 MP with QuickTake video, (1.4 μm) (1/2.55") Sony Exmor IMX333-Inspired, quad-LED flash, ƒ/1.8 aperture, Optical image Stabilization, autofocus, IR filter, Burst mode, 6-element lens, 4K video recording at 30 or 60 FPS or 1080p at 30 or 60 FPS, Slow-motion video (1080p at 120 FPS or 240 FPS), Time-lapse with stabilization, Panorama (up to 63 megapixels), Portrait Mode, Portrait Lighting (excluding Stage Light), Face detection, Digital image stabilization, Stereo audio recording
- Front camera: 7 MP with QuickTake video, f/2.2 aperture, burst mode, exposure control, face detection, Smart-HDR, auto image stabilization, Retina flash, 1080p HD video recording Portrait Mode, Portrait Lighting, and Animoji (same as iPhone XS)
- Display: 6.1 inch (155 mm) diagonal Liquid Retina: LED-backlit IPS LCD, 1792 × 828 px (326 ppi); 625 cd/m² max. brightness (typical), with dual-ion exchange-strengthened glass.
- Sound: Stereo speakers
- Water resistance: IP67
- Hearing aid compatibility: M3, T4
- Made in: China
- Other: FaceTime audio- or video-calling, Lightning connector for charging, wired headphones and other accessories (not included), Voice over LTE
- Website: iPhone XR – Apple at the Wayback Machine (archived September 9, 2019)

The iPhone XR (Note: Stylized and marketed as iPhone Xʀ; Roman numeral "X" pronounced as "ten") is a smartphone developed and marketed by Apple. It is part of the twelfth generation of the iPhone, alongside the higher-end iPhone XS and XS Max models. Pre-orders began on October 19, 2018, with the official release on October 26, 2018. Launched at $749 in the US, the iPhone XR was the least expensive device in Apple's twelfth generation of iPhones, which also includes the iPhone XS and XS Max, and was therefore considered an "affordable flagship" or "budget flagship" phone at its release.

The XR shares key internal hardware with the XS but with features removed or downgraded to reduce the price. The XR features the same processor as the XS and XS Max, the Apple A12 Bionic chip built with a 7 nanometer process. Instead of the OLED screen on the XS, the XR has a 6.1-inch Liquid Retina LED-backlit LCD IPS panel display. According to Apple, the full charge of the XR battery lasts up to one-and-a-half hours longer than that of its direct predecessor, the iPhone 8 Plus.

The iPhone XR was available in six colors: black, white, blue, yellow, coral (a shade of pink and orange), and Product Red. It is the second iPhone to be released in white, yellow and blue, the first being the iPhone 5c in 2013. Along with the iPhone XS and iPhone XS Max, it is the last iPhone to feature an uncentered Apple logo and the "iPhone" text printed on the back, as the iPhone 11 series and all subsequent series removed the iPhone text entirely while shifting the position of the Apple logo to the center of the back.

Internationally, the phone supports dual SIMs through a Nano-SIM and an eSIM. In mainland China, Hong Kong, and Macau, dual Nano-SIM (in a single tray) is offered instead. The iPhone XR was available in three storage capacities: 64 GB, 128 GB, and 256 GB. The 256 GB version was discontinued with the release of the iPhone 11 and 11 Pro; while the iPhone XS was discontinued and replaced by the iPhone 11 Pro, the iPhone XR continued on sale at a lower price point with the iPhone 11 succeeding as the "affordable flagship". The iPhone XR continued to be made available alongside the iPhone 12 for the following year. The iPhone XR was discontinued and removed from Apple's website after the announcement of the iPhone 13 on September 14, 2021.

The iPhone XR was Apple's best selling 2018 model. It also became the best-selling and the most popular smartphone globally in Q3 2019. As of September 2020, the iPhone XR has sold 77.4 million units worldwide, making it the eighth best-selling smartphone of all time.

== History ==
The iPhone XR was announced by Phil Schiller on September 12, 2018, at the Steve Jobs Theater in the Apple Park campus, alongside the higher-priced iPhone XS and XS Max, where all three products were showcased to the public.

Apple's Managing Director of Greater China, Isabel Ge Mahe, noted that the launch of the iPhone XR had "been somewhat overshadowed" by competition from the Huawei Mate 20 Pro. By January 2019, poor iPhone XR sales led some Chinese retailers to slash prices.

In 2019, Apple started assembling the iPhone XR in India, with design being led by Jony Ive and Rayan Rechka.

== Design ==
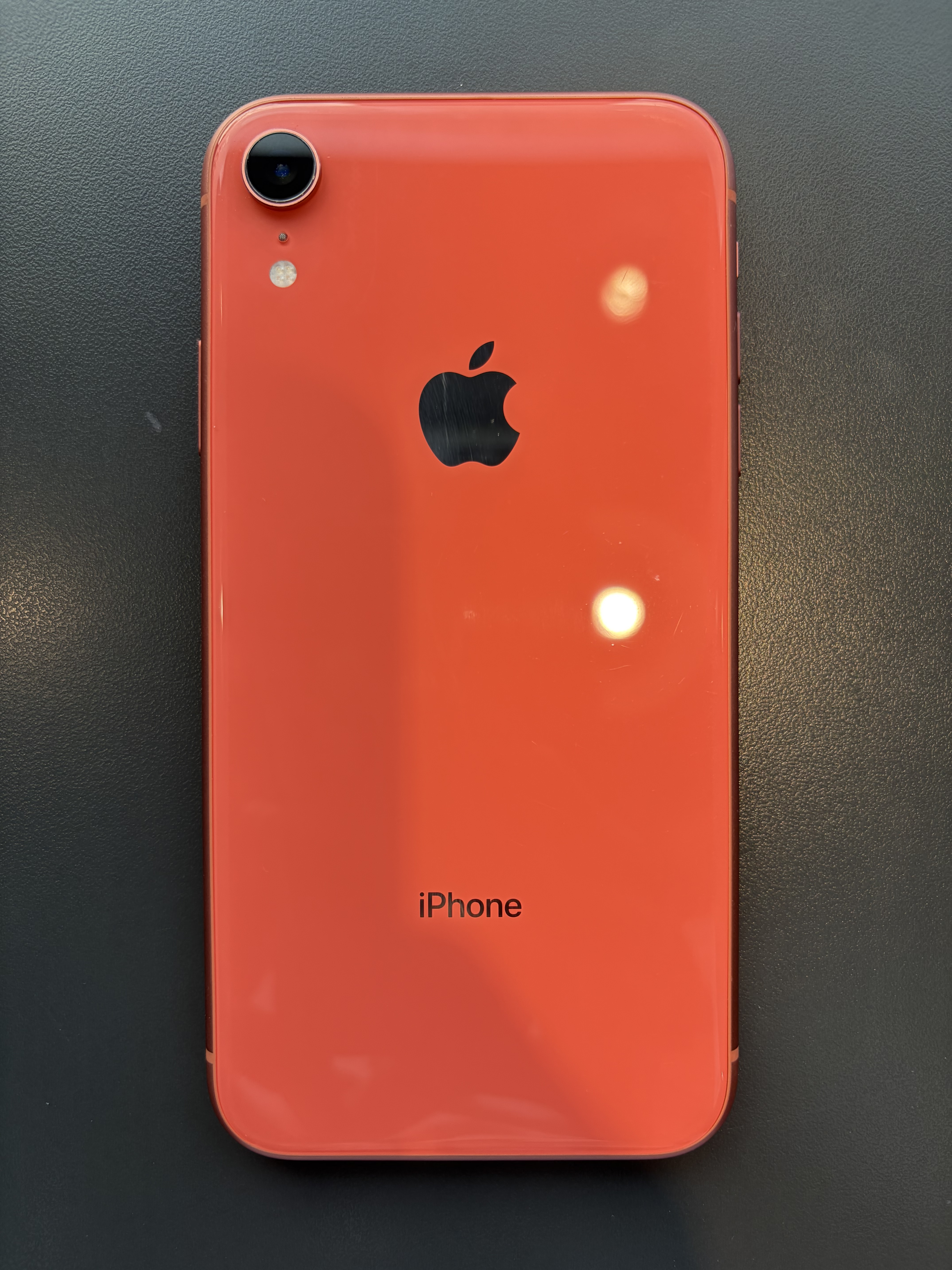
The back of the iPhone XR in Coral

=== Hardware ===
The XR has a similar design to the iPhone X and iPhone XS. However, the XR has slightly larger bezels, a bigger screen, an aluminum frame, and is available in a wide variety of colors. Similar to other X-branded iPhones, all models come with a black front. The XR has an IP67 rating for dust and water resistance, which means it can be immersed in 1-metre deep water for up to 30 minutes.

Released as part of the same twelfth generation, the XR has similar hardware to the XS, but with a few features removed or downgraded to reduce the price. The XR features the same system-on-chip (SoC) as the XS and XS Max, the Apple A12 Bionic chip built with a 7 nanometer process, which Apple claimed to be the "smartest and most powerful chip" ever put into a smartphone.

The XR has an LCD known as "Liquid Retina", which Apple advertised as the "most advanced LCD in the industry", instead of the OLED screen used on the X, XS, and XS Max. The display on the XR has a resolution of 1792 × 828 pixels and a pixel density of 326 ppi, compared with 458 ppi on other X-branded iPhones. However, it has 120 Hz Touch Sample Rate which is the same as the XS and XS Max. Instead of 3D Touch, the XR comes with Haptic Touch where the user long-presses until they feel a vibration from the Taptic Engine. The screen-to-body ratio of the XR is 79.3%, much higher than the 67.5% of the iPhone 8 Plus but is still lower than most other phones in its price category.

Unlike other phones in the X-series, the XR ships with a single camera on the rear of the phone, featuring exactly the same main camera sensor as on the XS and XS Max, utilizing a 1/2.55" sensor size and 1.4μm pixel size. Unlike the XS, it does not have optical zoom because of the single camera. DxOMark gave the camera on the iPhone XR a rating of 101, giving the title "Top-ranked single-lens phone". Despite the rear single-camera setup, a modified version of Portrait Mode is included. It works unaltered while using the TrueDepth front camera, but with the rear camera, it attempts to calculate the depth of field using a combination of the focus pixels on the image sensor and AI, resulting in more limitations including lower resolution depth data and subjects not being close enough due to the wide-angle lens being used instead of the missing telephoto lens. Just like the iPhone XS and XS Max, the iPhone XR also offers an adjustable depth of field through software, allowing the user to adjust the background bokeh effect after taking a photo.

Color	Name
	Black
	White
	Blue
	Yellow
	Coral
	Product (Red)

=== Software ===
The iPhone XR shipped with iOS 12 installed out of the box and is compatible with iOS versions up to and including iOS 18. Due to hardware limitations, it is not compatible with iOS 26, which was released on September 15, 2025.

== Reception ==
=== Critical reviews ===
TechRadar praised the iPhone XR's battery life, color options, and price while criticizing its camera and low-resolution display.

=== Controversies ===
==== Display ====
Some online media outlets criticized the iPhone XR's display for having a low resolution and a low pixel per inch density, relative to other phones on the market at the time of release at the price point. However, other online media outlets ignored these concerns, saying that under normal use, users should not be able to discern the pixels.

==== Power adapter and EarPods ====
Apple, as part of an environmental initiative, removed the EarPods and power adapter from all new iPhone boxes starting in October 2020, including the iPhone XR. Apple claimed that removing these items will reduce e-waste and permit a smaller iPhone box, allowing more devices to be shipped simultaneously to decrease carbon footprint. Apple only included a USB-C to Lightning cable, which was compatible with increasingly prevalent USB-C charging sources, but incompatible with the previous (and then more common) USB-A power adapter that Apple included with its devices, leading to Apple recommending users who don't have a USB-C based charging source to use existing USB-A to Lightning cables or buying a USB-C power adapter separately.

== See also ==
- List of iPhone models
- History of iPhone
- List of best-selling mobile phones
- Timeline of iPhone models

Preceded by iPhone 8 / 8 Plus	iPhone; 12th generation alongside iPhone XS / XS Max	Succeeded by iPhone 11
