= IPad Mini 2 =

2013 tablet computer by Apple

iPad Mini 2

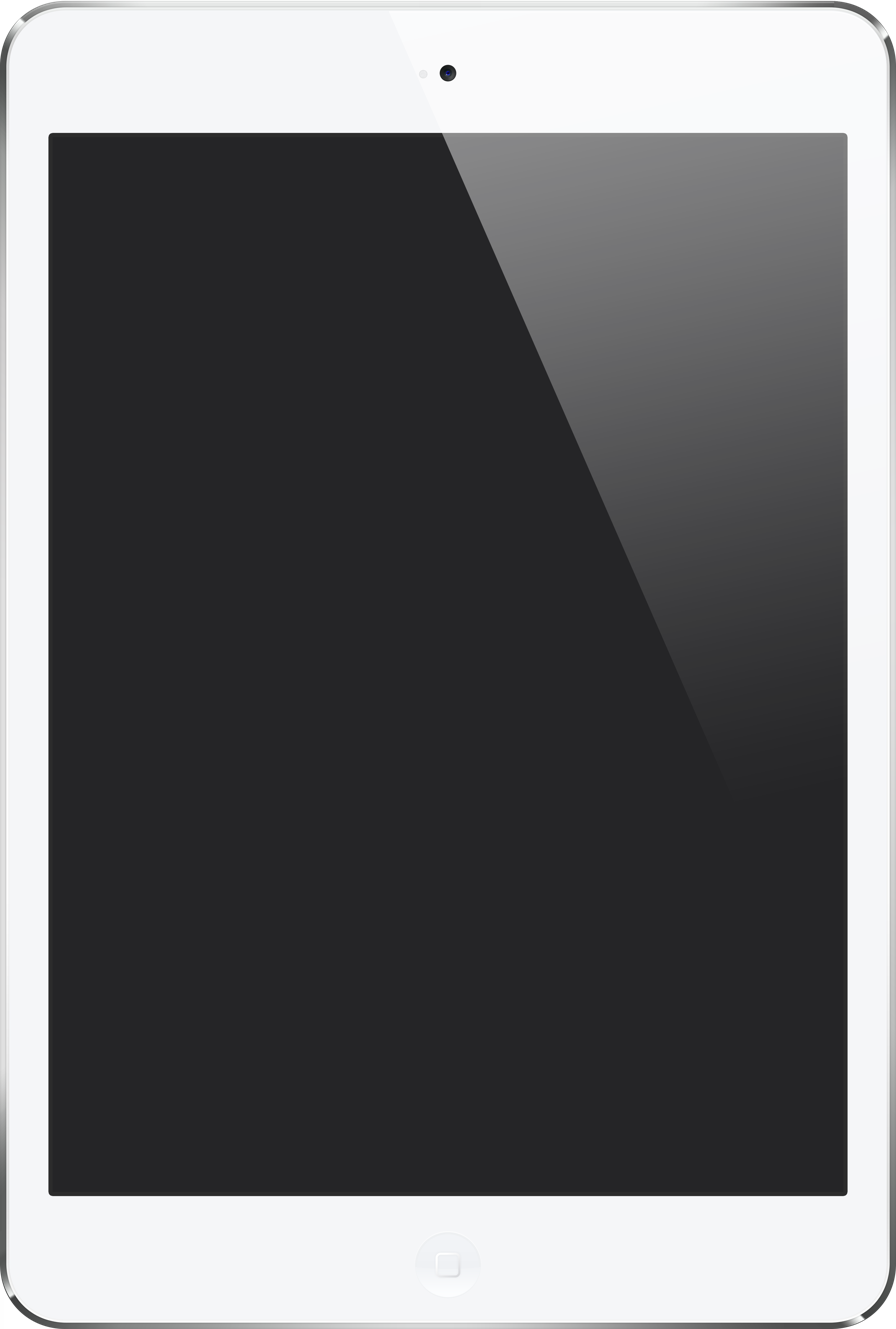
- iPad Mini 2 in Silver
- Developer: Apple Inc.
- Product family: iPad Mini
- Type: Tablet computer
- Lifespan: October 23, 2013 – March 21, 2017
- Introductory price: Wi-Fi: 16 GB: $399, 32 GB: $499, 64 GB: $599, 128 GB: $699; Wi-Fi + Cellular: 16 GB: $529, 32 GB: $629, 64 GB: $729, 128 GB: $829
- Discontinued: March 21, 2017
- Units sold: Over 1 million in the first 3 days
- Units shipped: 1 million+
- Operating system: Original: iOS 7.0.3; Last: iOS 12.5.8
- System on a chip: Apple A7 with 64-bit architecture and Apple M7 motion co-processor
- Memory: 1 GB LPDDR3 DRAM
- Storage: 16, 32, 64 or 128 GB (Note: 1 GB = 1 billion bytes) flash memory
- Display: 2048×1536 px (326 PPI), 7.9 in (200 mm) diagonal, 4:3 LED-backlit IPS LCD
- Input: Multi-touch screen, headset controls, proximity and ambient light sensors, 3-axis accelerometer, 3-axis gyroscope, digital compass
- Camera: iSight Camera: 5 mega-pixels, ƒ/2.4 aperture, 1080p video. FaceTime HD Camera: 1.2MP photos, ƒ/2.4 aperture, 720p HD video.
- Connectivity: Wi-Fi 802.11 a/b/g/n at 2.4 GHz and 5 GHz Bluetooth 4.0 GSM UMTS / HSDPA 850, 1700, 1900, 2100 MHz GSM / EDGE 850, 900, 1800, 1900 MHz CDMA CDMA/EV-DO Rev. A and B. 800, 1900 MHz LTE Multiple bands A1490: 1, 2, 3, 4, 5, 7, 8, 13, 17, 18, 19, 20, 25, 26; A1491: 1, 2, 3, 5, 7, 8, 18, 19, 20 and TD-LTE 38, 39, 40
- Power: Built-in rechargeable Li-Po battery 23.8 W⋅h (86 kJ), 10hr life
- Online services: App Store, iTunes Store, iBookstore, iCloud, Game Center
- Dimensions: Height: 200 mm (7.9 in); Width: 134.7 mm (5.30 in); Depth: 7.5 mm (0.30 in)
- Weight: Wi-Fi: 331 g (0.730 lb); Wi-Fi + Cellular: 341 g (0.752 lb)
- Backward compatibility: With iOS 7 until iOS 12
- Predecessor: iPad Mini (1st generation)
- Successor: iPad Mini 3
- Related: iPad Air (1st generation)
- Website: web.archive.org/web/20131030084536/http://www.apple.com/ipad-mini/ At the Wayback Machine (Archived October 30, 2013)

The iPad Mini 2 (formerly marketed as the iPad mini with Retina display, officially iPad mini 2 with Retina display) is a tablet computer designed and marketed by Apple Inc. It has a nearly identical design to its predecessor, the first-generation iPad Mini, but features internal revisions such as the use of an A7 system-on-a-chip and a 2,048 x 1,536 resolution Retina Display. Internally, the second-generation iPad Mini has nearly the same hardware as its sibling device, the iPad Air (1st generation). Apple released the second-generation iPad Mini in space gray and silver colors on November 12, 2013.

The iPad Mini 2 was initially released with iOS 7.

== History ==
The second-generation iPad Mini was announced during a keynote at the Yerba Buena Center for the Arts on October 22, 2013. The theme of the keynote was 'We still have a lot to cover.' The iPad Mini 2 was then released on October 23, 2013, in silver and space gray colors. It was initially released with IOS 7.0.3, but cellular models were initially released with iOS 7. On March 21, 2017, the iPad mini 2 was discontinued along with the iPad Air 2 with the announcement of the 2017 iPad and was no longer sold through Apple but continued to support major software revisions. iOS 12 is the last major software release supported by the iPad mini 2. Apple has confirmed the A7 SoC used on the iPad mini 2 is not powerful enough to run iPadOS 13 or higher, leaving the only models in the iPad mini line supporting newer iOS versions as of May 1, 2023, being the iPad Mini (5th generation), and iPad Mini (6th generation). The last version of iOS that the iPad mini 2 supports is iOS 12.5.8, released on January 26, 2026.

== Features ==
=== Software ===
The second-generation iPad Mini was released with the iOS 7 operating system, which debuted shortly earlier than the iPad, on September 18, 2013. Apple's chief designer, Jony Ive, described the update of iOS 7's new elements as "bringing order to complexity", highlighting features such as refined typography, new icons, translucency, layering, physics, and gyroscope-driven parallaxing as some of the major changes to the design. The design of both iOS 7 and OS X Yosemite (version 10.10) noticeably departed from previous skeuomorphic design elements such as green felt in Game Center, wood in Newsstand, and leather in Calendar, in favor of a flat, colourful design.

The iPad mini can act as a hotspot with some carriers, sharing its Internet connection over Wi-Fi, Bluetooth, or USB, and also access the Apple App Store, a digital application distribution platform for iOS. The service allows users to browse and download applications from the iTunes Store that were developed with Xcode and the iOS SDK and were published through Apple. From the App Store, GarageBand, iMovie, iPhoto, and the iWork apps (Pages, Keynote, and Numbers) are available.

The second-generation iPad Mini comes with several pre-installed applications, including Siri, Safari, Mail, Photos, Video, Music, iTunes, App Store, Maps, Notes, Calendar, Game Center, Photo Booth, and Contacts. Like all iOS devices, the iPad can sync content and other data with a Mac or PC using iTunes, although iOS 5 and later can be managed and backed up without a computer. Although the tablet is not designed to make phone calls over a cellular network, users can use a headset or the built-in speaker and microphone to place phone calls over Wi-Fi or cellular using a VoIP application, such as Skype. The device has a dictation application, using the same voice recognition technology as the iPhone 4S. This enables users to speak and the iPad types what they say on the screen, though the iPad must have an internet connection available (via Wi-Fi or cellular network) due to the feature's reliance on Apple servers to translate the speech.

The second-generation iPad Mini has an optional iBooks application, which displays books and other ePub-format content downloaded from the iBookstore. Several major book publishers including Penguin Books, HarperCollins, Simon & Schuster and Macmillan have committed to publishing books for the device. Despite being a direct competitor to both the Amazon Kindle and Barnes & Noble Nook, both Amazon.com and Barnes & Noble offer e-reader apps for the iPad.

The iPad mini 2 supported 6 major iOS versions, which go by iOS 7, iOS 8, iOS 9, iOS 10, iOS 11, and iOS 12. The iPad mini 2 was the first iPad mini to support 6 major versions, and receive full support for all of them. It is also the first 64-bit iPad mini (the original iPad mini was the last 32-bit iPad).

The iPad mini 2 has not been supported past iOS 12 due to the hardware limitations of its A7 chip.

=== Design ===
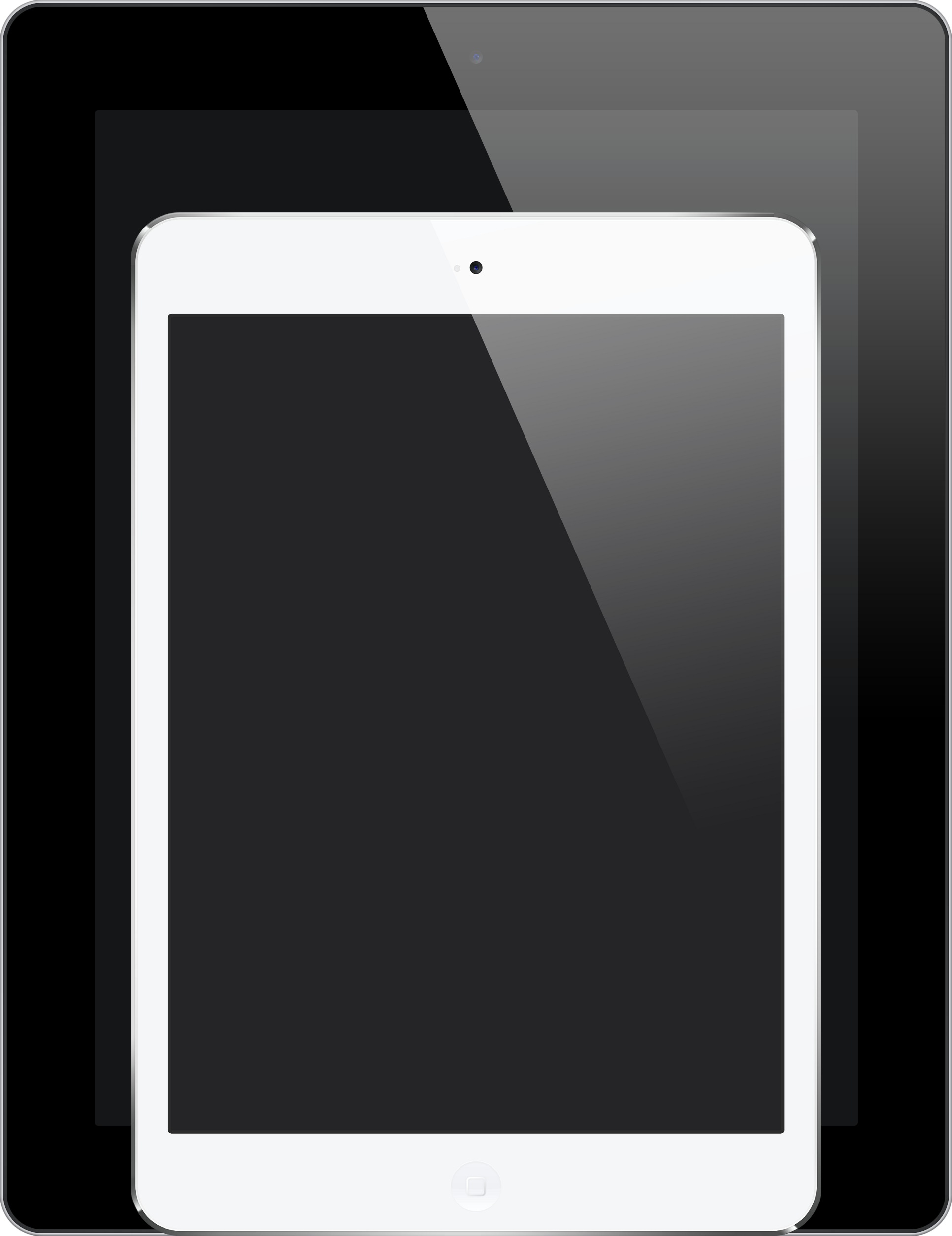
Size comparison between first- and second-generation iPad mini and the second-, third-, and fourth-generation full-sized iPad

The second-generation iPad Mini largely has the same design as the first iPad Mini. One notable change is the inclusion of a Retina Display, matching the screen resolution of the full-sized Retina iPad models. The slate-colored back panel of the first-generation iPad Mini was discontinued in favor of "space grey", a black color, and the white color still remains.

=== Hardware ===
Although the second-generation iPad Mini inherits hardware components from the iPhone 5S, such as its 64-bit Apple A7 system-on-chip—featuring a Secure Enclave for enhanced security—and Apple M7 motion processor, it uses the same home button as its predecessor and therefore does not support the Touch ID fingerprint sensor. It also includes a 5 megapixel rear-facing camera, a 1.2 MP FaceTime HD front-facing camera, support for 802.11n Wi-Fi networking, and an estimated 10 hours of battery life.

As with all previous generations of iPad hardware, there are four buttons and one switch on the second-generation iPad Mini. With the device in its portrait orientation, these are: a "home" button on the face of the device under the display that returns the user to the home screen, a wake/sleep button on the top edge of the device, and two buttons on the upper right side of the device performing volume up/down functions, under which is a switch whose function varies according to device settings, functioning either to switch the device into or out of silent mode or to lock/unlock the orientation of the screen. In addition, the WiFi only version weighs 331 grams while the cellular model weighs 341 grams – slightly more than their respective predecessors. The display responds to other sensors: an ambient light sensor to adjust screen brightness and a 3-axis accelerometer to sense orientation and switch between portrait and landscape modes. Unlike the iPhone and iPod Touch's built-in applications, which work in three orientations (portrait, landscape-left and landscape-right), the iPad's built-in applications support screen rotation in all four orientations, including upside-down. Consequently, the device has no intrinsic "native" orientation; only the relative position of the home button changes.

The audio playback of the second-generation iPad Mini is in stereo with two speakers located on either side of the lightning connector.

The second-generation iPad Mini is available with 16, 32, 64 or 128 GB of internal flash memory, with no expansion option. Apple sells a "camera connection kit" with an SD card reader, but it can only be used to transfer photos and videos.

All second-generation iPad Mini models can connect to a wireless LAN and offer dual band Wi-Fi support. The tablet is also manufactured either with or without the capability to communicate over a cellular network. The second-generation iPad Mini (as well as the iPad Air) cellular model comes in two variants, both of which support nano-SIMs, quad-band GSM, penta-band UMTS, and dual-band CDMA EV-DO Rev. A and B. Additionally, one variant also supports LTE bands 1, 2, 3, 4, 5, 7, 8, 13, 17, 18, 19, 20, 25 and 26 while the other variant supports LTE bands 1, 2, 3, 5, 7, 8, 18, 19, 20 and TD-LTE bands 38, 39 and 40. Apple's ability to handle many different bands in one device allowed it to offer, for the first time, a single iPad variant which supports all the cellular bands and technologies deployed by all the major North American wireless providers at the time of the device's introduction.

=== Timeline ===
Timeline of iPad models
See also: List of Apple products

Source: Apple Newsroom Archive.

== Reception ==
=== Critical reception ===
Writing for TechRadar, Gareth Beavis awarded the second-generation iPad Mini a rating of 4.5 out of 5. Beavis praises the Retina display and A7 chip's performance, and states that its "design is still the best in the tablet category." However, he does criticize the price increase. On his website, AnandTech, Anand Lal Shimpi highly compliments the design and increased speed of the second-generation iPad Mini while lamenting the limited color palette, stating "...it's a shame that this is a tradeoff that exists between the two iPads especially given how good Apple is about sRGB coverage in nearly all of its other displays." Despite some criticisms, such as the quality of the camera, Jeffrey Van Camp of Digital Trends gave the second-generation iPad Mini a score of 4.5 out of 5. He writes: "The iPad Mini 2 is our favorite tablet of 2013. With a powerful 64-bit A7 processor and a high-resolution ‘Retina’ screen, it finishes the job that Apple started with the first iPad Mini."

== See also ==
- List of iPad models
- Comparison of tablet computers
- Comparison of e-book readers

== Notes ==
Preceded by iPad Mini (1st generation)	iPad Mini 2; 2013	Succeeded by iPad Mini 3
