= IPad Mini 4 =

2015 tablet computer by Apple

iPad Mini 4

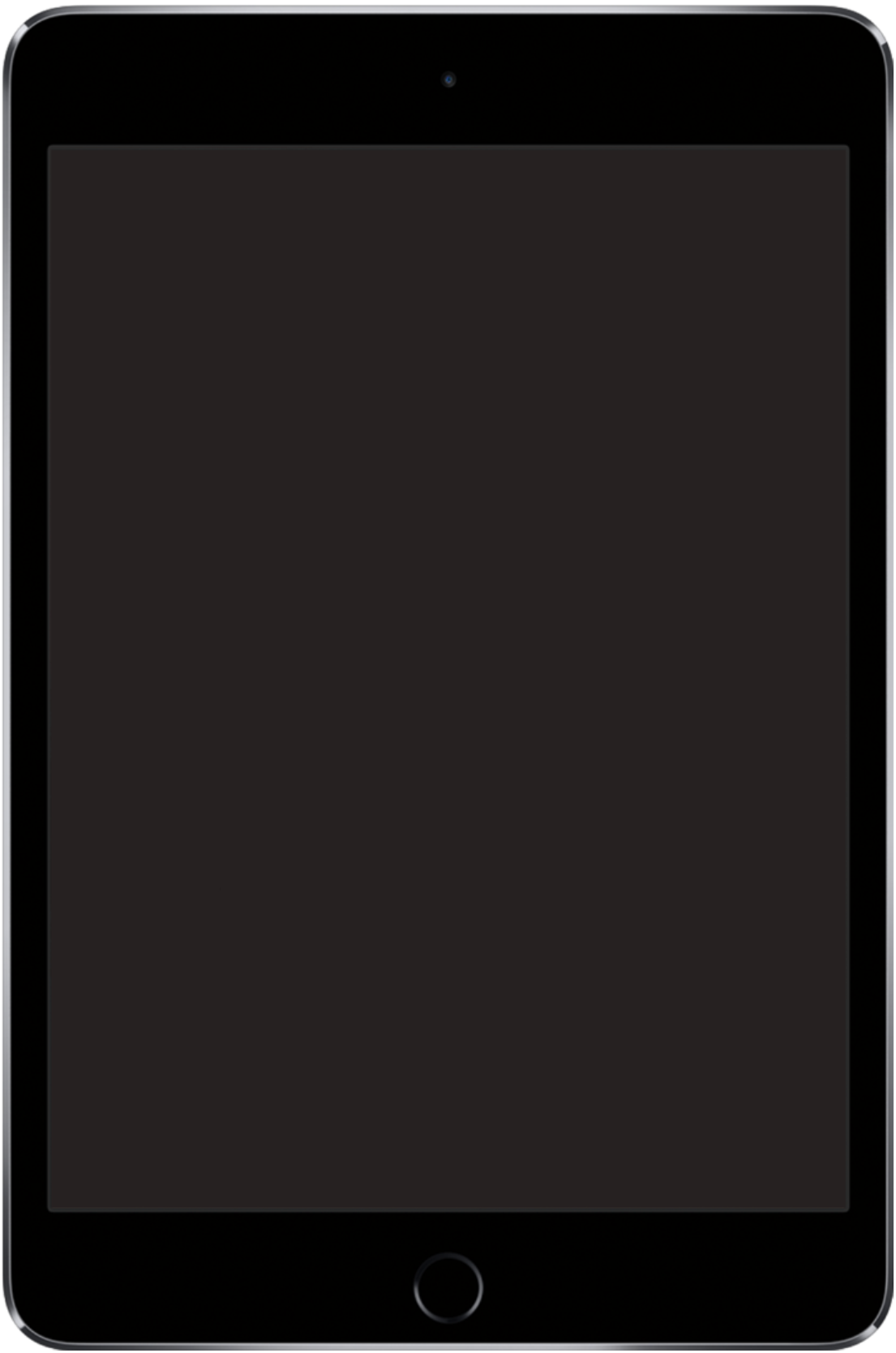
- An iPad Mini 4 with black bezels
- Developer: Apple Inc.
- Manufacturer: Foxconn
- Product family: iPad Mini
- Type: Tablet computer
- Generation: 4th
- Released: September 9, 2015
- Introductory price: $399 USD £319 GBP $569 AUD $439 CAD €499 EUR
- Discontinued: March 18, 2019
- Operating system: Original: iOS 9.0; Current: iPadOS 15.8.8, released May 11, 2026
- System on a chip: Apple A8 with 64-bit architecture and Apple M8 motion co-processor
- CPU: 1.5GHz dual-core 64-bit ARMv8-A "Typhoon"
- Memory: 2 GB LPDDR3 RAM
- Storage: 16, 32, 64, 128 GB flash memory
- Display: 7.9 inches (200 mm) 2048×1536 px (326 ppi) IPS LCD with a 4:3 aspect ratio and anti-glare coating
- Graphics: PowerVR GX6450ios
- Input: Multi-touch screen, headset controls, M8 motion co-processor, proximity and ambient light sensors, 3-axis accelerometer, 3-axis gyroscope, digital compass, dual microphone, Touch ID fingerprint reader, barometer
- Camera: Front: 1.2 MP, 720p HD, ƒ/2.2 aperture Rear: 8.0 MP AF, iSight with Five Element Lens, Hybrid IR filter, video stabilisation, face detection, HDR, ƒ/2.4 aperture
- Connectivity: Wi-Fi and Wi-Fi + Cellular: Wi-Fi 802.11 a/b/g/n/ac at 2.4 GHz and 5 GHz and MIMO Bluetooth 4.2 Wi-Fi + Cellular: GPS & GLONASS GSM UMTS / HSDPA 850, 1700, 1900, 2100 MHz GSM / EDGE 850, 900, 1800, 1900 MHz CDMA CDMA/EV-DO Rev. A and B. 800, 1900 MHz LTE Multiple bands A1567: 1, 2, 3, 4, 5, 7, 8, 13, 17, 18, 19, 20, 25, 26, 28, 29 and TD-LTE 38, 39, 40, 41
- Power: 3.82 V 19.32 W·h (5124 mA·h)
- Online services: App Store, iTunes Store, iBookstore, iCloud, Game Center
- Dimensions: Height: 203.2 mm (8.00 in); Width: 134.8 mm (5.31 in); Depth: 6.1 mm (0.24 in)
- Weight: Wi-Fi: 298.8 g (0.659 lb); Wi-Fi + Cellular: 304 g (0.670 lb)
- Predecessor: iPad Mini 3
- Successor: iPad Mini (5th generation)
- Related: iPad Pro, iPad Air 2
- Website: iPad mini 4 – Apple at the Wayback Machine (archived April 8, 2016)

The iPad Mini 4 (stylized and marketed as iPad mini 4) is the fourth-generation iPad Mini tablet computer developed and marketed by Apple Inc. It was announced along with the iPad Pro on September 9, 2015, and released the same day. The iPad Mini 4, which replaced the iPad Mini 3, was discontinued on March 18, 2019, when it was replaced by the fifth-generation iPad Mini. It features most of the hardware similar to the iPad Air 2 including its laminated display and design.

== History ==
The iPad Mini 4 was announced during the "Hey Siri" Apple Special Event on September 9, 2015, alongside other new or refreshed products, including the iPad Pro, the iPhone 6s, and the Apple TV. However, there was minimal focus directly on the new device, with only a brief mention at the end of the iPad Pro portion of the keynote.

== Features ==
=== Software ===
The iPad Mini 4 ships with the iOS 9 operating system pre-installed, and was the first device to do so. With an additional 1 GB of RAM compared to the previous generations' Mini, the iPad Mini 4 is capable of utilizing the Slide Over, Split View and Picture in Picture multitasking functions in iOS 9.

The device is compatible with iOS 9.1, which was released on October 21, 2015, which adds the News app for the UK and Australia as well as additional emoji and other bug fixes.

It was revealed at WWDC 2019 that the iPad Mini 4 would support iPadOS, despite rumours saying that it wouldn't. It does lack the support for some features though such as Memoji Stickers, Apple's ARKit based applications and support for Sidecar in macOS Catalina, due to it having the Apple A8 Processor. Apart from this, most of the features that were introduced in iPadOS will work with this iPad, including support for external USB drives (using the camera connection kits), the redesigned split screen and multitasking interface (with support for two apps to be open at once) and support for Haptic Touch (no haptic feedback will be felt as the iPad family don't have Taptic Engines). iPadOS 14 and 15 was also supported, albeit with less features. It was revealed in WWDC 2022 that iPadOS 16 won't be supported on the Mini 4, along with the iPad Air 2.

=== Design ===
The iPad Mini 4 was the first major redesign of the iPad Mini line, with a slightly taller and wider body (though with no increase in screen size) compared to the iPad Mini 2 and Mini 3. There is also a much thinner design, with the device mirroring the depth of the iPad Air 2 at 6.1 millimeters. This device is also lighter than the previous generation by 33.2 grams.

Due to the redesign, this device is incompatible with cases that would otherwise work with the iPad Mini 2 or iPad Mini 3. To compensate for this, Apple released a Smart Cover and Silicone Case for the Mini 4, which can be used separately or together as a fully protective case. Unlike the iPad Air 2, there is no leather Smart Case made by Apple for the device. The mute switch was removed, as was done for the iPad Air 2.

As with the iPad Mini 3, the iPad Mini 4 is available in three colors: Space Gray, Silver, and Gold.

=== Hardware ===
While the iPad Air 2 and iPad Mini 3 were both released in October 2014, the Mini 3 carried over the Mini 2's internals including the A7 processor in place of the hardware found in the iPad Air 2. The iPad Mini 4 features upgraded hardware closer in specs to the iPad Air 2. However, the Mini 4 supports a dual-core A8 processor in place of the tri-core A8X. Apple claims that this processor is "1.3x faster" at CPU tasks and "1.6x faster" at graphics tasks over the A7 processor found in previous Mini models. Along with the iPad Air 2, there are 2 GB of RAM, allowing the device to support the advanced multitasking features made available with the iOS 9 operating system.

Like the iPad Mini 3 that came before it, the iPad Mini 4 is capable of making mobile payments via Apple Pay in combination with the Touch ID sensor, although this can only be done in apps as the device lacks the NFC antenna required for payments at a merchant terminal. With iOS 10, Apple Pay is supported within the Safari app.

The device shares the same camera module as the iPad Air 2 with an 8 megapixel camera with a ƒ/2.4 aperture. The screen is the same Retina Display that has featured since the iPad Mini 2, although it is fully laminated (also like the iPad Air 2) and contains an anti-reflective coating, resulting in drastically improved picture quality compared to its predecessors. The iPad Mini 4 display features much improved color accuracy due to the increase to 101% sRGB Color Gamut compared to only ~62% on the previous models.

It has a slightly smaller battery compared to the previous generations though Apple claims the runtime to be the same 10 hours as its predecessor.

There is also an updated wireless module adding support for 802.11ac Wi-Fi and Bluetooth 4.2. As with its predecessor, the iPad Mini 4 was available with storage options of 16, 32, 64 or 128 GB, although upon the introduction of the iPad (5th generation) in March 2017, only the 128 GB variation remained available.

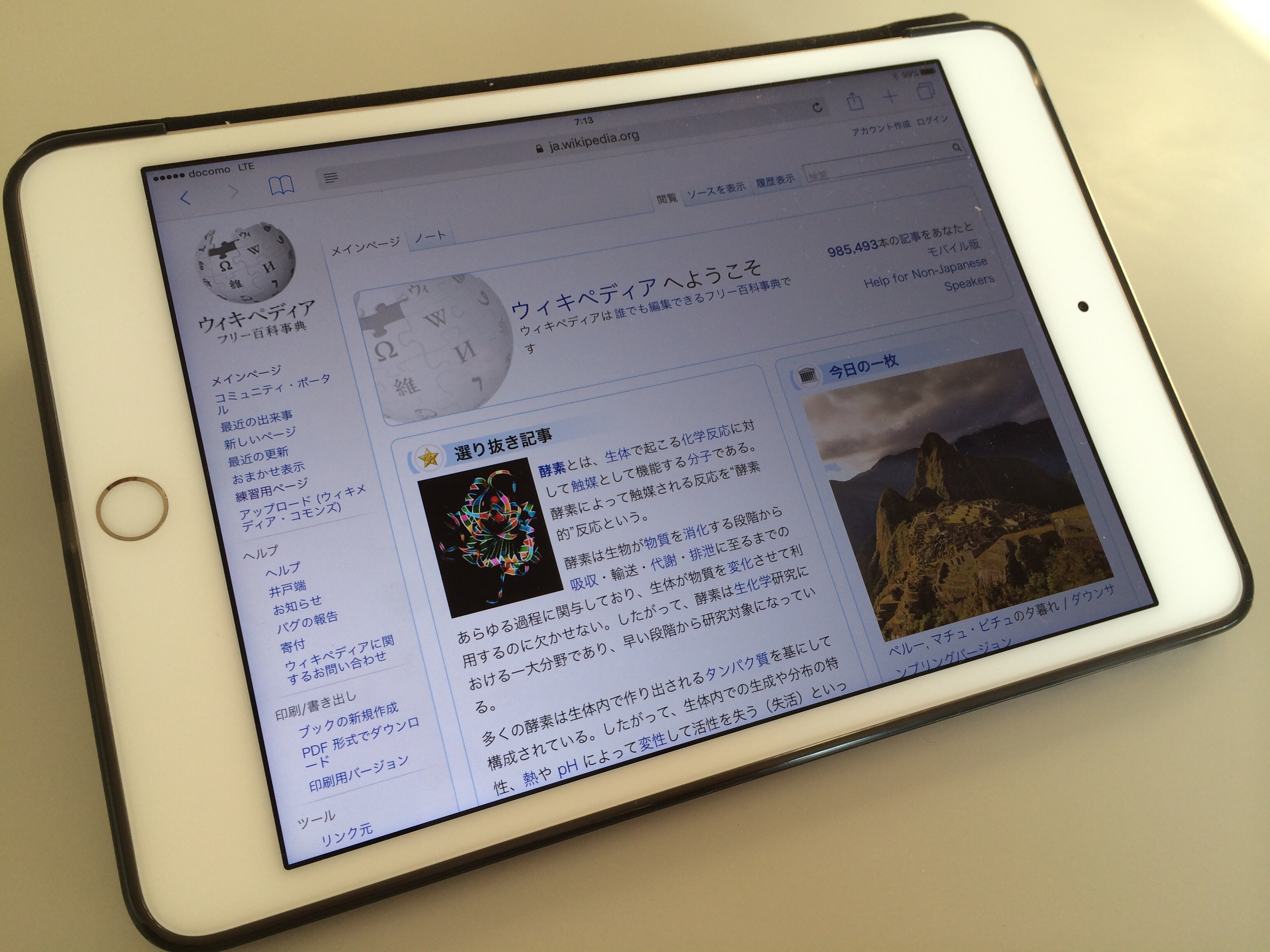
iPad mini 4 displaying the Japanese Wikipedia home page

Although the Apple Pencil was released alongside the iPad Mini 4 in September 2015, it was exclusively compatible with the iPad Pro released at the same time. Pencil support on the iPad Mini did not arrive until the 5th generation in 2019.

== Reception ==
Reviews have generally been positive, with The Verge giving the iPad Mini 4 a 9/10, praising the display, fast performance, great camera, and multitasking but disappointed with the speakers and chamfered edges.

CNET also praised the new "more vivid" display and the slimmer design as well as the new features in iOS 9 that the device can utilize. However, they also criticized it for being more expensive than other 8-inch tablets and the multitasking features not working as well on the smaller screen. There was also criticism of the iPad Mini 4's A8 processor which was a year old, regarded as a "step down" from the iPad Air 2's A8X and iPhone 6S's A9 processors. This contrasts with the iPad Mini 2 which featured the A7 processor used in the iPad Air and iPhone 5S when they were released in Fall 2013.

== Timeline ==
Timeline of iPad models
See also: List of Apple products

Source: Apple Newsroom Archive.

Preceded by iPad Mini 3	iPad Mini 4; 2015	Succeeded by iPad Mini (5th generation)
