= IPad Mini 3 =

2014 tablet computer by Apple

iPad Mini 3
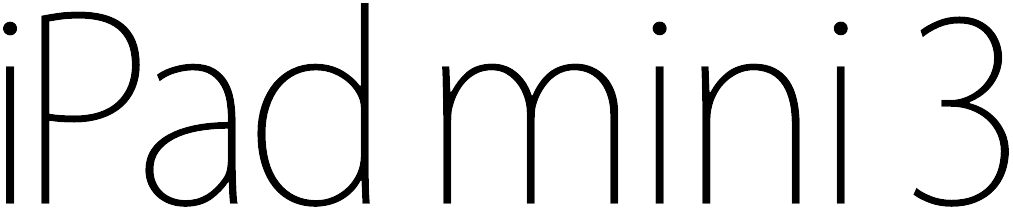

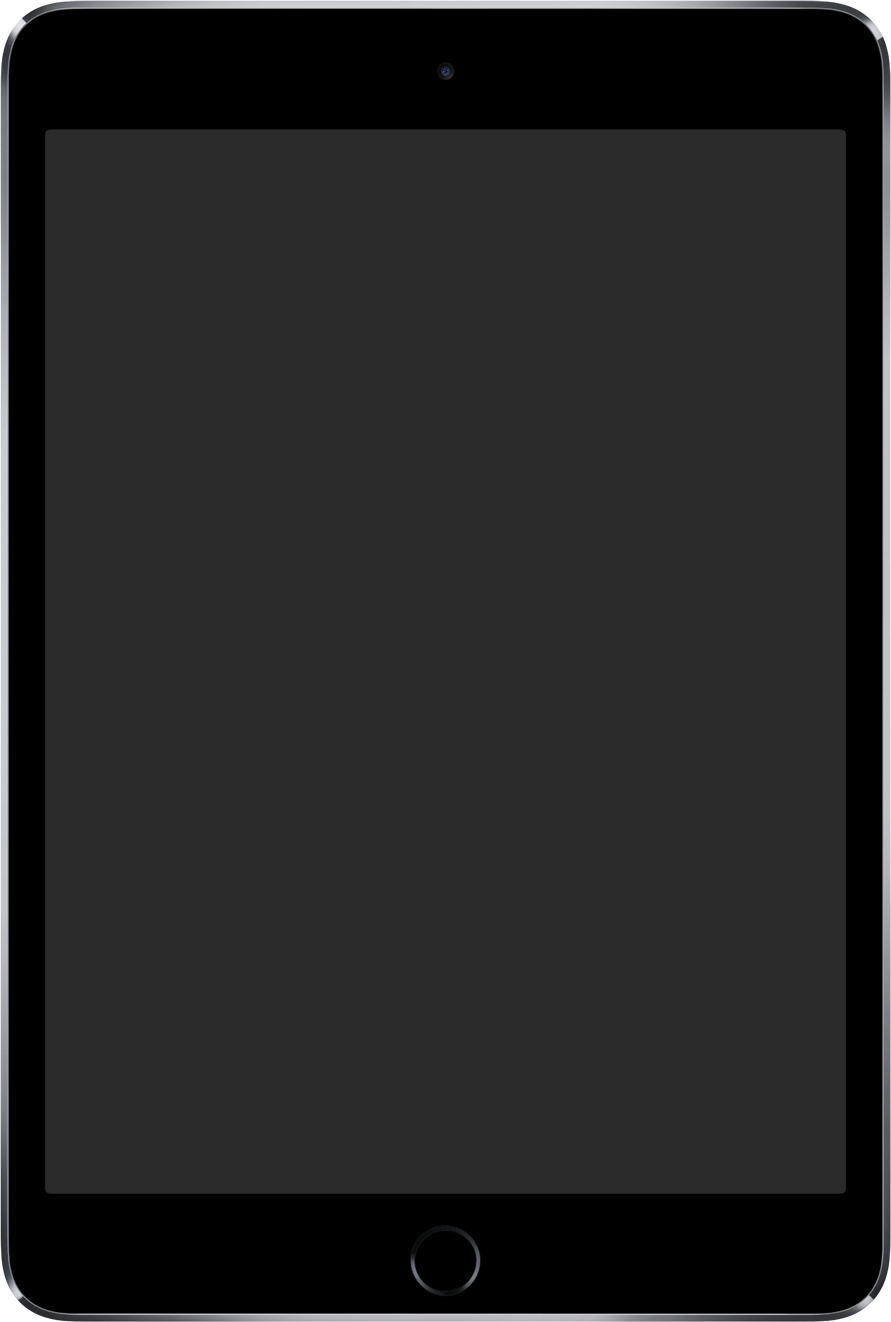
- Developer: Apple Inc.
- Product family: iPad Mini
- Type: Tablet computer
- Generation: 3rd
- Released: October 22, 2014; 12 years ago
- Introductory price: Wi-Fi: 16 GB: $399, 64 GB: $499, 128 GB: $599; Wi-Fi + Cellular: 16 GB: $529, 64 GB: $629, 128 GB: $729
- Discontinued: September 9, 2015; 11 years ago
- Operating system: Original: iOS 8.1; Last: iOS 12.5.8
- System on a chip: Apple A7 with 64-bit architecture and Apple M7 motion co-processor
- CPU: 1.3 GHz dual-core Apple Cyclone
- Memory: 1 GB LPDDR3 DRAM
- Storage: 16, 64, 128 GB flash memory
- Display: 64% Color 2048×1536 px (326 PPI), 7.9 in (200 mm) diagonal, 4:3 LED-backlit IPS LCD
- Graphics: PowerVR G6430 (four cluster@450 MHz)
- Input: Multi-touch screen, headset controls, M7 motion co-processor, proximity and ambient light sensors, 3-axis accelerometer, 3-axis gyroscope, digital compass, dual microphone
- Camera: Front: 1.2 MP, 720p HD; Rear: 5.0 MP AF, iSight with Five Element Lens, Hybrid IR filter, video stabilisation, face detection, HDR, ƒ/2.4 aperture
- Connectivity: Wi-Fi and Wi-Fi + Cellular: Wi-Fi a/b/g/n at 2.4 GHz and 5 GHz and MIMO Bluetooth 4.0 Wi-Fi + Cellular: GPS & GLONASS GSM UMTS / HSDPA 850, 1700, 1900, 2100 MHz GSM / EDGE 850, 900, 1800, 1900 MHz CDMA CDMA/EV-DO Rev. A and B. 800, 1900 MHz LTE Multiple bands
- Power: 3.75 V 24.3 W·h (6,471 mA·h)
- Online services: App Store, iTunes Store, iBookstore, iCloud, Game Center
- Dimensions: Height: 200 mm (7.9 in); Width: 134.7 mm (5.30 in); Depth: 7.5 mm (0.30 in)
- Weight: Wi-Fi: 331 g (0.730 lb); Wi-Fi + Cellular: 341 g (0.752 lb)
- Predecessor: iPad Mini 2
- Successor: iPad Mini 4
- Website: iPad mini 3 at the Wayback Machine (archived March 21, 2015)

The iPad Mini 3 (stylized and marketed as iPad mini 3) is the third-generation iPad Mini tablet computer developed and marketed by Apple Inc. It was announced alongside the iPad Air 2 on October 16, 2014 and released on October 22. It uses primarily the same design and hardware as that of its predecessor, the iPad Mini 2, though new features such as a Touch ID sensor compatible with Apple Pay, differing storage sizes and an additional gold color option were added.

On September 9, 2015, the iPad Mini 3 was discontinued and replaced by the iPad Mini 4.

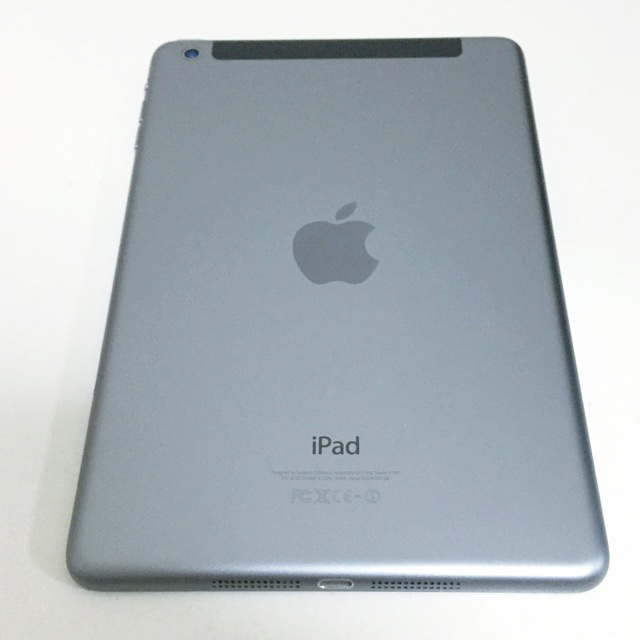
iPad Mini 2 and 3 have a similar outer shell design.

== Features ==
=== Software ===
The iPad Mini 3 was released with the iOS 8.1 operating system preinstalled. It comes with several built-in applications, which are Camera, Photos, Messages, FaceTime, Mail, Music, Safari, Maps, Siri, Calendar, iTunes Store, App Store, Notes, Contacts, iBooks, Game Center, Reminders, Clock, Videos, Newsstand, Photo Booth and Podcasts. The Apple App Store, a digital application distribution platform for iOS, allows users to browse and download applications made by various developers from the iTunes Store. Additional apps made by Apple itself are available for free download, which are iMovie, GarageBand, iTunes U, Find My iPhone, Find My Friends, Apple Store, Trailers, Remote, and the iWork apps (Pages, Keynote, and Numbers). Like all iOS devices, the iPad Mini 3 can also sync content and other data with a Mac or PC using iTunes. Users can use a headset or the built-in speaker and microphone to place phone calls over Wi-Fi or cellular using a VoIP application such as Skype (if hardware supported).

Siri, an intelligent personal assistant and knowledge navigator, is integrated into the device and it can be activated hands-free. The application uses a natural language user interface to answer questions, make recommendations, and perform actions by delegating requests to a set of web services. Apple claims that the software adapts to the user's individual preferences over time and personalizes results. Additionally, Siri can identify songs by using Shazam to listen to any song playing nearby. Siri then stores a list of any songs it has managed to identify on iTunes.

Facebook and Twitter come integrated through Apple's native apps. Facebook features can be directly accessed from within native apps such as Calendar which can sync Facebook events, or use Facebook's like button from within the Apple App Store.

Software updates for the iPad Mini 3 lasted until 2019, with its last update being iOS 12.5.8, released on January 26, 2026. The iPad Mini 3 did not get iPadOS 13, like the previous generation (which also used an Apple A7 processor).

=== Design ===
The iPad Mini 3 uses almost exactly the same design as that of the iPad Mini 2, with the addition of Touch ID. Additionally, with the announcement of iPad Mini 3 and the iPad Air 2, Apple added the gold color option to the existing silver and space gray color choices of iPads.

=== Hardware ===
iPad Mini 3 uses nearly the same hardware as the iPad Mini 2, the main exception being the addition of the Touch ID sensor. It has a 7.9" retina display with 2048-by-1536-pixel resolution at 326 ppi. The iPad Mini 3 also uses the A7 chip with 64-bit architecture and the M7 motion coprocessor. It has a 5MP iSight Camera capable of recording 1080p HD video and a 1.2MP FaceTime HD Camera capable of recording 720p HD video.

The new Touch ID sensor detects the user's fingerprint and can be used instead of a passcode to unlock the iPad. Touch ID on the iPad Mini 3 is also compatible with Apple Pay and can be used to authorize purchases in online apps only with fingerprint verification, as opposed to entering passwords.

The iPad Mini 3 is available with storage options of 16, 64 or 128 GB and has no expansion option. Apple also released a "camera connection kit" with an SD card reader that supports MTP.

== Reception ==
The iPad Mini 3 received positive reviews but drew fainter praise than its predecessor, as it was identical to the iPad Mini 2 except for the addition of Touch ID and the availability of the gold color. The iPad Mini 2 was regarded as a better buy, being US$100 cheaper and featuring the same screen and internals. While the Mini 2 and 3 were stuck at the same hardware level of the original iPad Air, the iPad Air 2's new hardware was considerably more powerful. Furthermore, the Air 2 was also redesigned lighter and smaller than the original Air, which nullified some of the advantages of the Mini 2 and 3's compact form factor.

== Timeline ==
Timeline of iPad models
See also: List of Apple products

Source: Apple Newsroom Archive.

Preceded by iPad Mini 2	iPad Mini 3; 2014	Succeeded by iPad Mini 4
