= Apple A8 =

System-on-a-chip designed by Apple Inc.

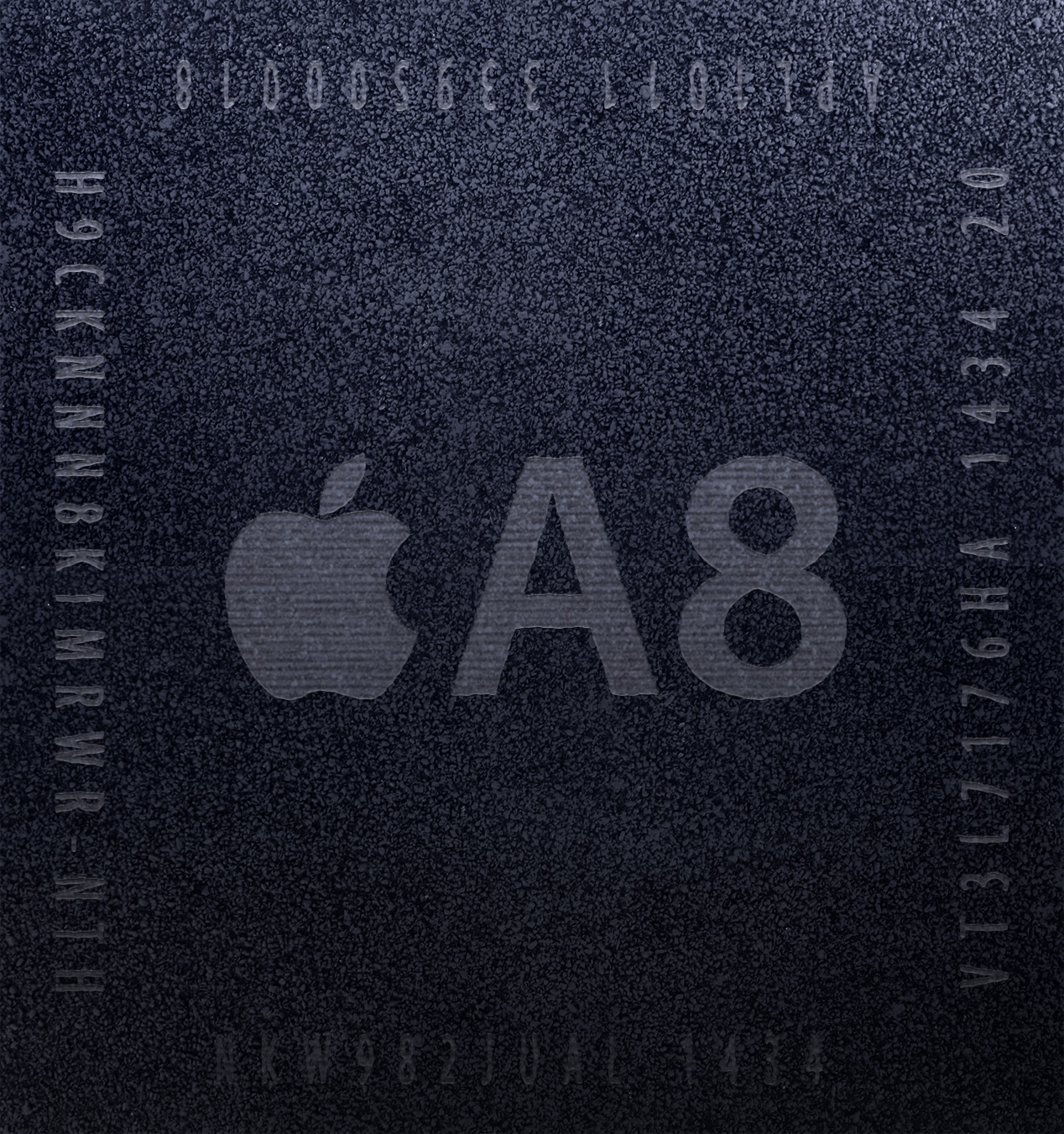
- Apple A8 processor

General information
- Launched: September 9, 2014
- Discontinued: October 18, 2022
- Designed by: Apple Inc.
- Common manufacturer: TSMC (Note: Most analysts have reported that the Apple A8 is manufactured by TSMC, including Chipworks, Techinsights, and AnandTech. An analyst at IHS reports that manufacturing is split, with TSMC manufacturing about 60 percent and Samsung manufacturing about 40 percent.)
- Product code: APL1011

Performance
- Max. CPU clock rate: 1.1 GHz (iPod Touch (6th generation)) to 1.4 GHz (iPhone 6, iPhone 6 Plus) and 1.5 GHz (iPad mini 4 & Apple TV (4th Gen))

Physical specifications
- Transistors: 2 billion
- Cores: 2
- GPU: Custom PowerVR Series 6XT (quad-core)

Cache
- L1 cache: Per core: 64 KB instruction + 64 KB data
- L2 cache: 1 MB shared
- L3 cache: 4 MB

Architecture and classification
- Application: Mobile
- Technology node: 20 nm (TSMC 20SOC)
- Microarchitecture: Typhoon
- Instruction set: ARMv8-A: A64, A32, T32

Products, models, variants
- Variant: Apple A8X

History
- Predecessor: Apple A7
- Successor: Apple A9

The Apple A8 is a 64-bit ARM-based system on a chip (SoC) designed by Apple Inc., part of the Apple silicon series. It first appeared in the iPhone 6 and iPhone 6 Plus, which were introduced on September 9, 2014. Apple states that it has 25% more CPU performance and 50% more graphics performance while drawing only 50% of the power of its predecessor, the Apple A7. The Apple A8 chip was discontinued on October 18, 2022, following the discontinuation of the Apple TV HD.

iOS 12, released in 2018, was the last major software update for the iPhone 6 & 6 Plus and iPod Touch (6th generation). iPadOS 15, released in 2021, was the last major software update for the iPad Mini 4. tvOS 26, released in 2025, was the last major software update for the Apple TV HD. The HomePod (1st generation) is still supported by audioOS 27, making the Apple A8 is the oldest supported Apple SoC.

== Design ==
The A8 is manufactured on a 20 nm process by TSMC, which replaced Samsung as the manufacturer of Apple's mobile device processors. It contains 2 billion transistors. Despite having twice the number of transistors of the A7, the A8's physical size has been reduced by 13% to 89 mm^{2} (0.138 in^{2}). The A8 uses LPDDR3-1333 RAM on a 64-bit memory interface; in the iPhone 6/6 Plus, sixth generation iPod Touch, and HomePod, the A8 has 1 GB RAM included in the package. Meanwhile, the A8 in the iPad Mini 4 and 4th generation Apple TV is packaged with 2 GB RAM.

The A8 CPU has a per-core L1 cache of 64 KB for data and 64 KB for instructions, an L2 cache of 1 MB shared by both CPU cores, and a 4 MB L3 cache that services the entire SoC. As its predecessor, it has a 6 decode, 6 issue, 9 wide, out-of-order design. The processor is dual core, and as used in the iPhone 6 has a frequency of 1.4 GHz, supporting Apple's claim of it being 25% faster than the A7. It also supports the notion of this being a second generation enhanced Cyclone core called Typhoon, and not an entirely new architecture which would supposedly mean a more significant performance gain per Hz.

The A8 also integrates a graphics processing unit (GPU) which is a 4-shader-cluster PowerVR Series 6XT. However the GPU features custom shader cores designed by Apple.

On October 16, 2014, Apple introduced a variant of the A8, the A8X, in the iPad Air 2. Compared with the A8, the A8X has an enhanced 8-shader-cluster GPU and improved CPU performance due to one extra core and higher frequency.

The A8 has video codec encoding support for H.264. It has decoding support for H.264, MPEG‑4, and Motion JPEG.

== Patent litigation ==
The A8's branch predictor has been claimed to infringe on a 1998 patent. On October 14, 2015, a district judge found Apple guilty of infringing U.S. patent US 5781752, "Table based data speculation circuit for parallel processing computer", on the Apple A7 and A8 processors. The patent is owned by Wisconsin Alumni Research Foundation (WARF), a firm affiliated with the University of Wisconsin. On July 24, 2017, Apple was ordered to pay WARF $506 million for patent infringement. Apple filed an appellate brief on October 26, 2017, with the U.S. Court of Appeals for the Federal Circuit, that argued that Apple did not infringe on the patent owned by the Wisconsin Alumni Research Foundation. On September 28, 2018, the ruling was overturned on appeal and the award thrown out by the U.S. Federal Circuit Court of Appeals. The patent expired in December 2016.

== Products that include the Apple A8 ==
- Actively supported with latest software updates
  - HomePod (1st generation) - Upgraded to audioOS 27 on September 14, 2026, this is the last product with an A8 processor receiving the latest Apple OS updates
- Discontinued with no further software updates
  - iPhone 6 & 6 Plus
  - iPod Touch (6th generation)
  - iPad Mini 4
  - Apple TV HD (formerly 4th generation)

== Gallery ==
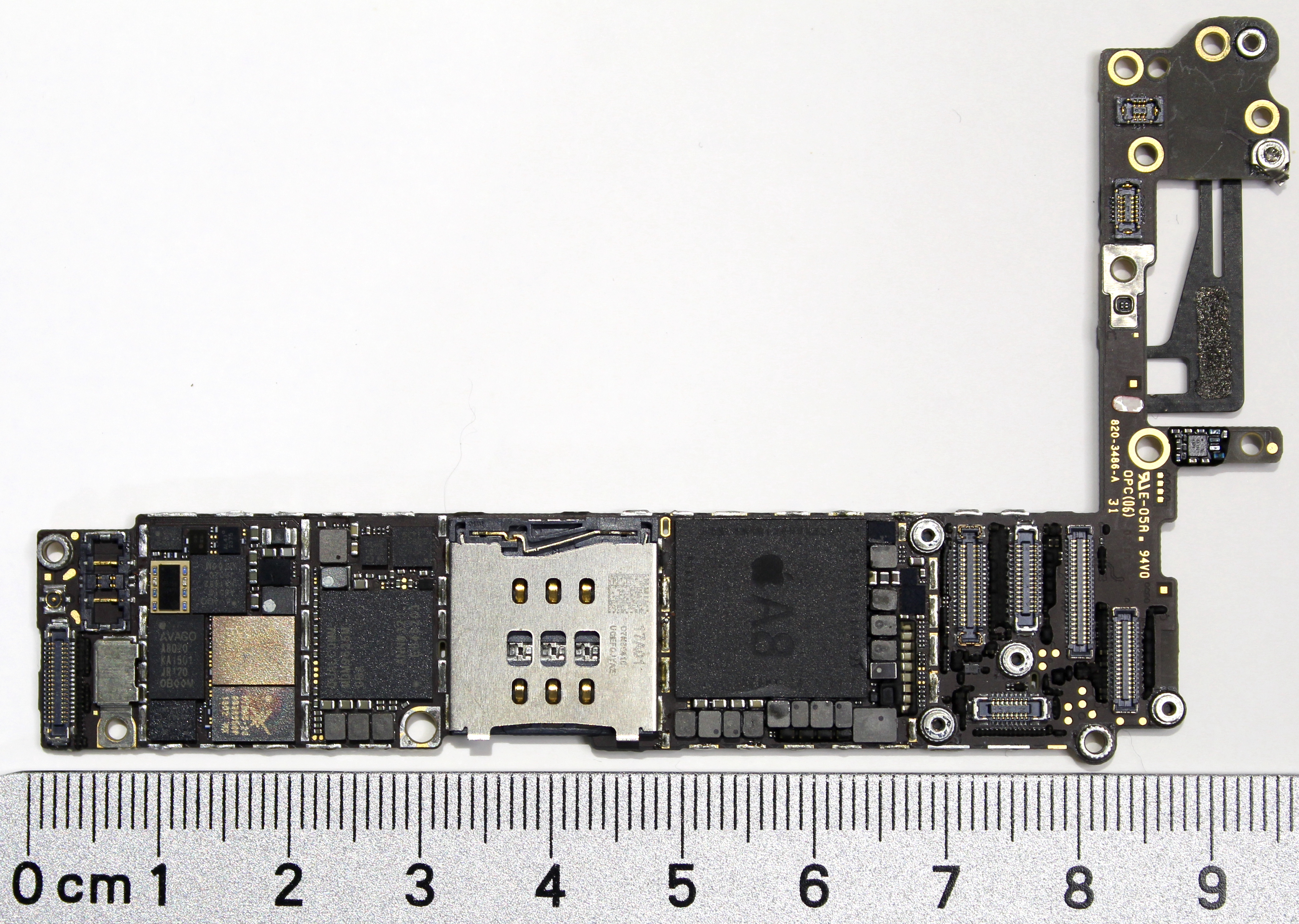
A8 SoC on iPhone 6 main logic board

== See also ==
- Apple silicon, the range of ARM-based processors designed by Apple
- Comparison of ARMv8-A cores
- Apple A8X

== Notes ==
Preceded by Apple A7 (APL0698 Variant)	Apple A8; 2014	Succeeded by Apple A9
