= IPad Air 2 =

2014 tablet computer by Apple

iPad Air 2

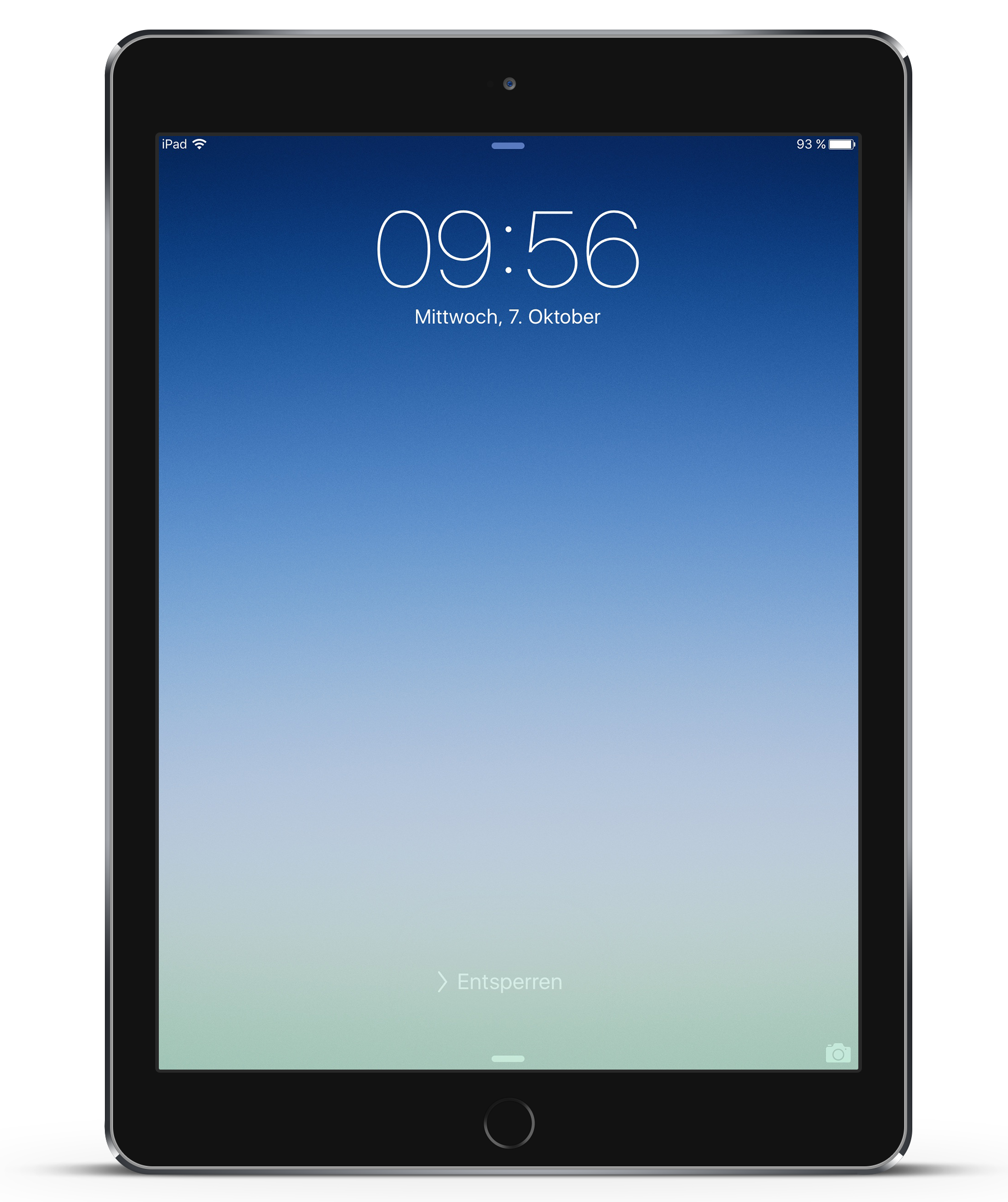
- iPad Air 2 in Space Gray
- Developer: Apple Inc.
- Product family: iPad Air
- Type: Tablet computer
- Generation: 2nd
- Released: October 22, 2014; 12 years ago
- Introductory price: $499 USD €489 EUR £399 GBP $619 AUD $549 CAD
- Discontinued: March 21, 2017; 9 years ago
- Units sold: 2 million
- Operating system: Original: iOS 8.1; Current: iPadOS 15.8.8, released May 11, 2026
- System on a chip: Apple A8X with 64-bit architecture and Apple M8 motion co-processor
- CPU: 1.5GHz tri-core 64-bit ARMv8-A "Typhoon"
- Memory: 2 GB LPDDR3 RAM
- Storage: 16, 32, 64, 128 GB flash memory
- Display: 9.7 inches (246 mm) 2,048 x 1,536 px (264 ppi) with a 4:3 aspect ratio
- Graphics: PowerVR GXA6850
- Sound: Stereo (both at bottom)
- Input: Multi-touch screen, headset controls, M8 motion co-processor, proximity, and ambient light sensors, 3-axis accelerometer, 3-axis gyroscope, digital compass, dual microphone, Touch ID fingerprint reader
- Controller input: PnP
- Camera: Front: 1.2 MP, 720p HD, ƒ/2.2 aperture Rear: 8.0 MP AF Sony Exmor RS IMX134, iSight with Five Element Lens, Hybrid IR filter, video stabilisation, face detection, HDR, ƒ/2.4 aperture
- Touchpad: Glass
- Connectivity: Wi-Fi and Wi-Fi + Cellular: Wi-Fi 802.11 a/b/g/n/ac at 2.4 GHz and 5 GHz and MIMO Bluetooth 4.2 Wi-Fi + Cellular: GPS & GLONASS GSM UMTS / HSDPA 850, 1700, 1900, 2100 MHz GSM / EDGE 850, 900, 1800, 1900 MHz CDMA CDMA/EV-DO Rev. A and B. 800, 1900 MHz LTE Multiple bands A1567: 1, 2, 3, 4, 5, 7, 8, 13, 17, 18, 19, 20, 25, 26, 28, 29, and TD-LTE 38, 39, 40, 41
- Power: 27.62 W·h, 3.76 V (7,340 mA·h)
- Online services: App Store, iTunes Store, iBookstore, iCloud, Game Center
- Dimensions: 240 mm (9.4 in) (h); 169.5 mm (6.67 in) (w); 6.1 mm (0.24 in) (d)
- Weight: Wi-Fi: 437 g (0.963 lb); Wi-Fi + Cellular: 444 g (0.979 lb)
- Predecessor: iPad Air
- Successor: iPad Pro (9.7 inch) iPad Air (3rd generation) iPad (5th generation)
- Related: iPad Mini 4
- Website: iPad Air 2 at the Wayback Machine (archived March 21, 2017)

The iPad Air 2 is a tablet computer developed and marketed by Apple Inc. It was announced on October 16, 2014, alongside the iPad Mini 3, both of which were released on October 22, 2014. It is the second generation of the iPad Air series. The iPad Air 2 is thinner, lighter and faster than its predecessor, the first-generation iPad Air, and features Touch ID with the height, width and screen size the same as the iPad Air.

The first-generation iPad Pro replaced the iPad Air 2 as the flagship iPad model, with the 9.7 inch version releasing March 31, 2016, and the Air 2 being relegated as the mid-range iPad model.

The iPad Air 2 was discontinued on March 21, 2017, as was the iPad Mini 2, alongside the introduction of the iPad (5th generation), which replaced the Air 2 as the entry-level iPad model. Its successor, the third-generation iPad Air, was released on March 18, 2019. The iPad Air 2 supported eight versions of iOS and iPadOS, from iOS 8 to iPadOS 15, but does not support iPadOS 16 due to hardware limitations.

== History ==
The iPad Air 2 was announced during a keynote on October 16, 2014, and was the first iPad to feature Touch ID. The theme of the keynote was "it's been way too long". The Air 2 began arriving in retail stores on October 22, 2014. The slogan for the device was Change Is in the Air. With the release of the new iPad Pro, the slogan for the device was changed to Light. Heavyweight.

== Features ==
=== Software ===
The iPad Air 2 originally shipped with iOS 8.1 pre-installed and includes a version of Apple Pay with the in-store NFC functionality removed. The included Touch ID sensor allows the user to pay for items online without needing to enter the user's card details.

iOS 8 comes with several built-in applications, which are Camera, Photos, Messages, FaceTime, Mail, Music, Safari, Maps, Siri, Calendar, iTunes Store, App Store, Notes, Contacts, iBooks, Home, Reminders, Clock, Videos, News, Photo Booth and Podcasts. The Apple App Store, a digital application distribution platform for iOS, allows users to browse and download applications made by various developers from the iTunes Store. Additional apps made by Apple itself are available for free download, which are iMovie, GarageBand, iTunes U, Find My iPhone, Find My Friends, Apple Store, Trailers, Remote, and the iWork apps (Pages, Keynote, and Numbers). Like all iOS devices, the iPad Air 2 can also sync content and other data with a Mac or PC using iTunes. Although the tablet is not designed to make phone calls over a cellular network, it can place and receive phone calls through an iPhone's cellular connection, using Apple's Continuity feature (supported on iOS 8 and later versions of iOS, and OS X Yosemite and later versions of macOS), or using a VoIP application, such as Skype.

On June 8, 2015, it was announced at the WWDC that the iPad Air 2 would support all of iOS 9's new features when it is released in Q3 2015. Air 2 users with iOS 9 will be able to use Slide Over, Picture in Picture and Split View. Slide Over allows a user to "slide" a second app in from the side of the screen in a smaller window, and have it display information alongside the initial app. Picture in Picture allows a user to watch video in a small, resizable, moveable window while remaining in another app. Split View allows a user to run two apps simultaneously in a 50/50 view.

It was revealed at WWDC 2019 that the iPad Air 2 would support iPadOS (despite some people speculating that it would not be supported by future versions). (The iPad Air 2 got iPadOS because of Split View support.) It does lack the support for some features though such as Memoji Stickers, Apple's ARKit based applications and support for Sidecar in macOS Catalina, due to it having the Apple A8X Processor. Apart from this, most of the features that were introduced in iPadOS will work with this iPad, including support for external USB drives (using the camera connection kits), the redesigned split screen and multitasking interface (with support for two apps to be open at once) and support for Haptic Touch (no haptic feedback will be felt as the iPad family doesn't have Taptic Engines). Many people have described this iPad with this new software as a budget, and watered down version of its successor the iPad Pro.

With the release of iPadOS 13.4, the iPad Air 2 supports the new mouse and trackpad feature. It works by using the camera connection kits or via bluetooth. Bluetooth powered keyboards with a trackpad may also work depending on the manufacturer.

At WWDC 2020, the iPad Air 2 was revealed to support iPadOS 14, even though some believed the iPad Air 2 would only receive one iPadOS version (iPadOS 13) and would not get iPadOS 14, due to its aging hardware and lack of newer features like ARKit 3. It lacks several features such as ARKit 4. It does though support the improved Safari browser and new Messages app. The iPad mini 4 was also supported by iPadOS 14.

On June 7, 2021 at the WWDC 2021, the iPad Air 2 was revealed to support iPadOS 15, despite rumors again suggesting the iPad Air 2 might be dropped due to performance limitations and its already long support history. This makes it the first device to support seven years of software updates including both iOS and iPadOS.

On June 6, 2022 after iPadOS 16 was announced at the WWDC 2022, it was revealed that the iPad Air 2 will not be compatible with this version of the operating system.

=== Hardware ===
The iPad Air 2 inherits hardware similar to both the iPhone 6 and iPhone 6 Plus with a major change in processor to the Apple A8X, the high-end 3-core variant of the Apple A8. The iPad Air 2 has 2 GB RAM (making the iPad Air 2 the first iOS device to have more than 1 GB RAM) and the PowerVR GPU has 8 cores. It also uses the Apple M8 motion co-processor which has a barometer and is the first generation of the iPad to inherit the fingerprint Touch ID sensor from the iPhone. In addition, compared to the iPad Air, it includes an improved 8-megapixel (3264×2448) rear-facing camera with 10 fps burst mode and slow motion video at 120 fps, similar to the iPhone 5S camera capabilities. The front-facing FaceTime HD camera has also been improved with a larger ƒ/2.2 aperture, which allows 81% more light in the image. Apple added a gold option to the existing silver and space gray color choices for the iPad Air 2, the previous existing colors were used on the preceding iPad Air.

Unlike its iPad predecessors, the mute/orientation lock switch has been removed to accommodate the reduced depth. Instead, the user must use the Control Center to access these functions.

It has a slightly smaller battery compared to the iPad Air, although Apple claims the same 10-hour battery life as before. The iPad Air 2 is available in 16, 32, 64 or 128 GB storage options with no storage expansion options. Apple has released a "camera connection kit" with an SD card reader, but it can only be used to transfer photos and videos to an iPad.

== Reception ==
The iPad Air 2 received positive reviews. The Verge called the Air 2 "the best tablet ever made", giving it a score of 9.3 out of 10 while noting that it offered only "iterative improvement" and that there were "missed opportunities" in its design.

== Timeline ==
Timeline of iPad models
See also: List of Apple products

Source: Apple Newsroom Archive.

Preceded by iPad Air	iPad Air 2; 2014	Succeeded by iPad Pro (9.7 inch) iPad Air (3rd generation) iPad (5th generation)
