= Apple A12 =

System-on-a-chip designed by Apple Inc.

Apple A12 Bionic
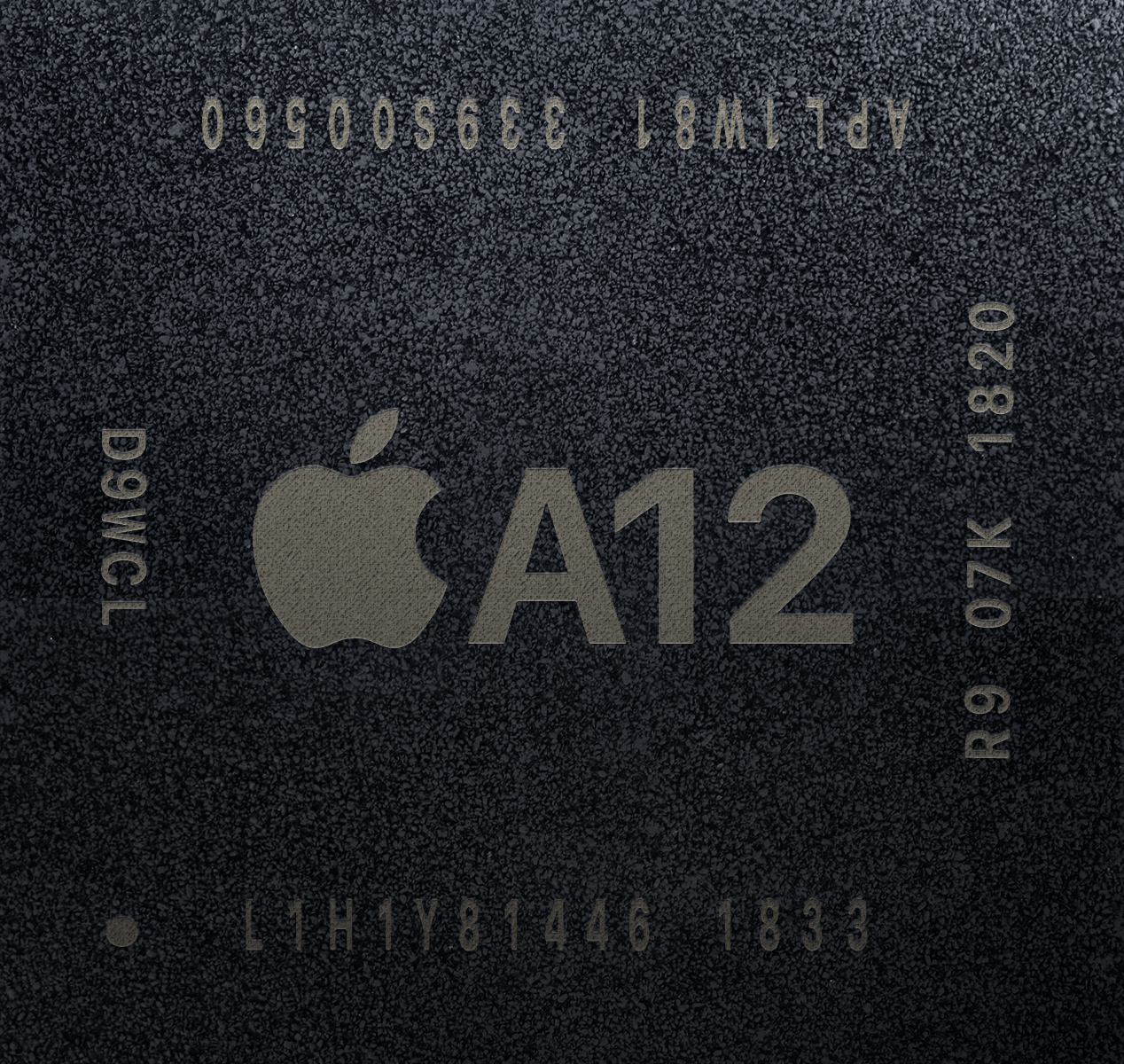

General information
- Launched: September 12, 2018; 8 years ago
- Discontinued: October 18, 2022; 3 years ago
- Designed by: Apple Inc.
- Common manufacturer: TSMC
- Product code: APL1W81
- Max. CPU clock rate: to 2.49 GHz

Physical specifications
- Transistors: 6.9 billion
- Cores: 6 (ARM big.LITTLE: 2× big Vortex + 4× little Tempest)
- GPU: Apple-designed 4 core "Apple G11P"

Cache
- L1 cache: 128 KB instruction, 128 KB data
- L2 cache: 8 MB

Architecture and classification
- Application: Mobile
- Technology node: 7 nm (TSMC N7)
- Microarchitecture: "Vortex" and "Tempest"
- Instruction set: A64 – ARMv8.3-A

Products, models, variants
- Variant: Apple S4/S5 SiP (cut-down version that utilizes high efficiency cores from A12) Apple A12X/A12Z (more advanced version of A12 in iPad Pro and Developer Transition Kit)

History
- Predecessor: Apple A11 Bionic
- Successor: Apple A13 Bionic

The Apple A12 Bionic is a 64-bit ARM-based system on a chip (SoC) designed by Apple Inc., part of the Apple silicon series, It first appeared in the iPhone XS and XS Max, iPhone XR, iPad Air (3rd generation), iPad Mini (5th generation), iPad (8th generation) and Apple TV 4K (2nd generation). Apple states that the two high-performance cores are 15% faster and 40% more energy-efficient than the Apple A11's, and the four high-efficiency cores use 50% less power than the A11's. It is the first mass-market system on a chip to be built using the 7 nm process.

iOS 18, released in 2024, was the last major software update for the iPhone XS and XR. iPadOS 26, released in 2025, was the last major software update for the iPad Mini (5th generation), iPad Air (3rd generation), and iPad (8th generation). tvOS support for the Apple TV 4K (2nd generation) is ongoing, with it supporting tvOS 27.

== Design ==
The Apple A12 SoC features an Apple-designed 64-bit ARMv8.3-A six-core CPU, with two high-performance cores called Vortex, running at 2.49 GHz, and four energy-efficient cores called Tempest. The Vortex cores are a 7-wide decode out-of-order superscalar design, while the Tempest cores are a 3-wide decode out-of-order superscalar design. Like the A11's Mistral cores, the Tempest cores are based on Apple's Swift cores from the Apple A6.

The A12 also integrates an Apple-designed four-core graphics processing unit (GPU) with 50% faster graphics performance than the A11. The A12 includes dedicated neural network hardware that Apple calls a "Next-generation Neural Engine." This neural network hardware has eight cores and can perform up to 5 trillion 8-bit operations per second. Unlike the A11's Neural Engine, third-party apps can access the A12's Neural Engine.

The A12 is manufactured by TSMC using a 7 nm FinFET process, the first to ship in a consumer product, containing 6.9 billion transistors. The die size of the A12 is 83.27 mm^{2}, 5% smaller than the A11. It is manufactured in a package on package (PoP) together with 4 GiB of LPDDR4X memory in the iPhone XS and XS Max and 3 GB of LPDDR4X memory in the iPhone XR, the iPad Air (2019), the 5th generation iPad mini, and the iPad (2020). The ARMv8.3 instruction set it supports brings a significant security improvement in the form of pointer authentication, which mitigates exploitation techniques such as those involving memory corruption, Jump-Oriented-Programming, and Return-Oriented-Programming.

The A12 has video codec encoding support for HEVC and H.264. It has decoding support for HEVC, H.264, MPEG‑4 Part 2, and Motion JPEG.

Die Block Comparison (mm²)
| SoC | A12 (7 nm) | A11 (10 nm) |
|---|---|---|
| Total Die | 83.27 | 87.66 |
| Big Core | 2.07 | 2.68 |
| Small Core | 0.43 | 0.53 |
| CPU Complex (incl. cores) | 11.90 | 14.48 |
| GPU Core | 3.23 | 4.43 |
| GPU Total | 14.88 | 15.28 |
| NPU | 5.79 | 1.83 |

== Products that include the Apple A12 Bionic ==
- iPhone XS & XS Max
- iPhone XR
- iPad Mini (5th generation)
- iPad Air (3rd generation)
- iPad (8th generation)
- Apple TV 4K (2nd generation)

== See also ==
- Apple silicon, the range of ARM-based processors designed by Apple
- Apple A12X
- Comparison of Armv8-A processors

| Preceded by Apple A11 Bionic | Apple A12 Bionic; 2018 | Succeeded by Apple A13 Bionic |
