= List of iPad accessories =

The iPad is an iPadOS-based (previously iOS) line of tablet computers designed and developed by Apple; it has a wide variety of accessories made by Apple available for it, including a screen cover specifically for the respective models of iPad called Smart Cover, as well as a number of accessories to allow the iPad to connect to other devices, some of which enable non-touchscreen input.

== Cases and covers ==
=== Apple iPad Case ===
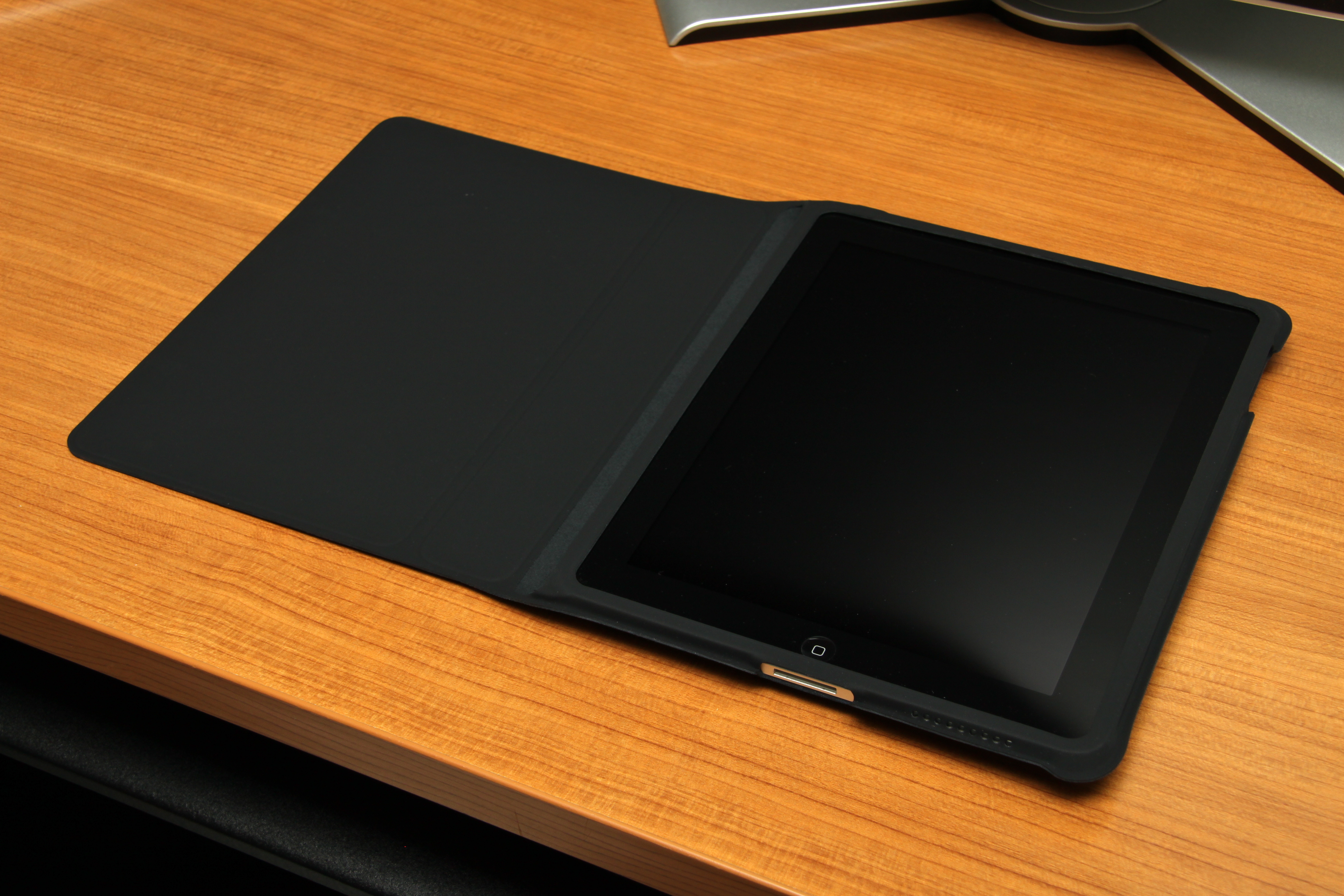

Apple's first iPad case does not have the magnetic features of later versions. Instead, it fits around the original iPad, providing a structured case with a microfiber interior. The front cover has the ability to fold to provide a stand.

Available for: iPad (1st generation)

=== Smart cover ===
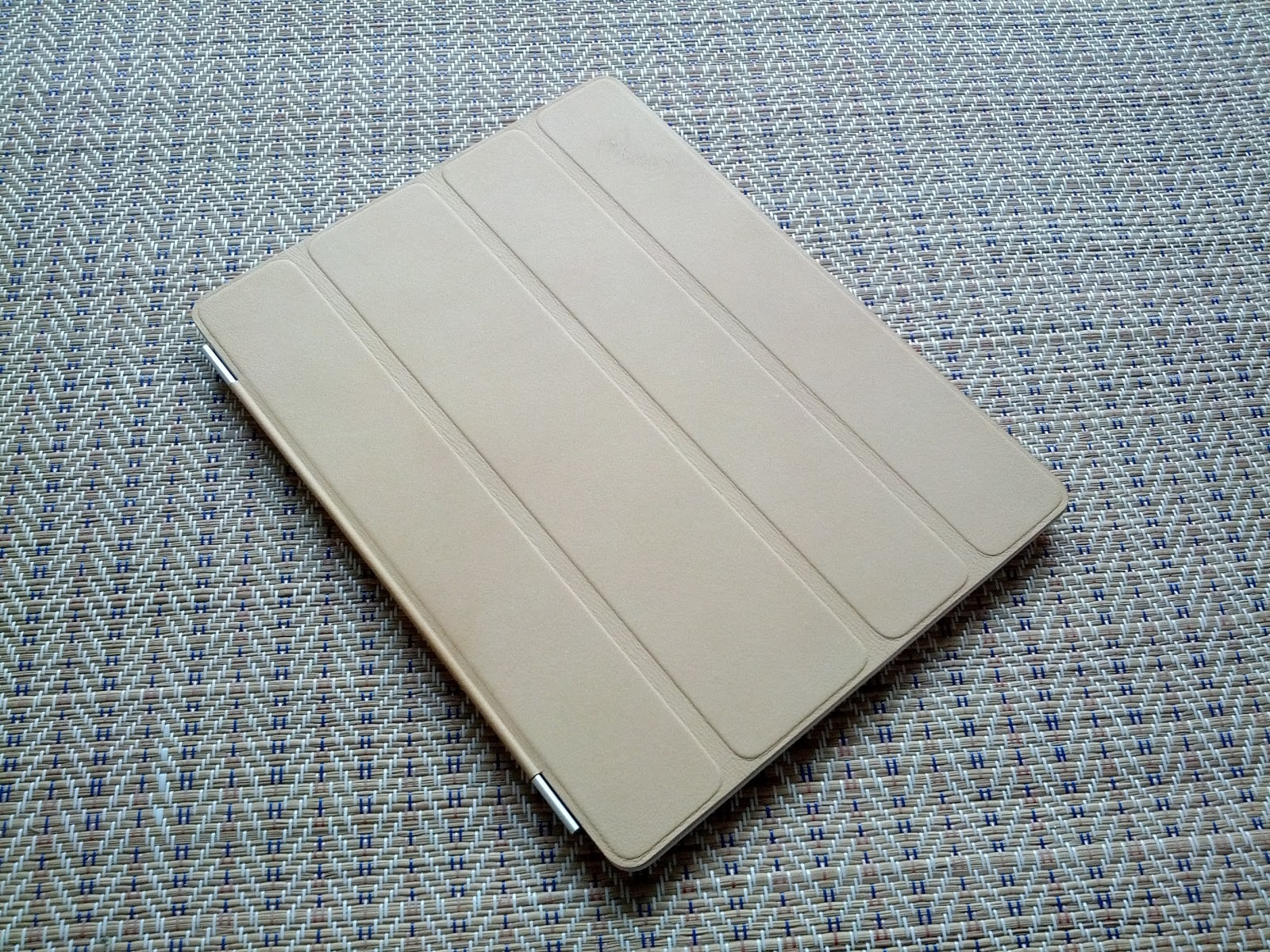

A cover that attaches magnetically to the side of the device and covers the front. The Smart Cover has three folds, dividing the case into four portions, so it can be maneuvered to create a stand for the tablet. This can be either used to prop the iPad up in a position suitable for typing, or in an upright position for watching video and video calling over FaceTime. To expose the rear-facing HD video camera on the iPad, the cover can also be folded in half. The cover aligns with the front screen of the iPad and is designed to add very little thickness to the overall profile of the device. Additionally, when the Smart Cover is lifted off the face of the iPad, it automatically turns the device on from standby, meaning the on/off button on the top right of the device does not need to be pressed when the user wishes to use it. A smaller Smart Cover, featuring 3 folds and an integrated hinge, was released alongside the iPad mini. Starting with the iPad Air, all subsequent smart covers followed this design similar to the iPad mini.

Available for: iPad 2, iPad (3rd generation), iPad (4th generation), iPad (5th generation), iPad (6th generation), iPad (7th generation), iPad (8th generation), iPad (9th generation), iPad Air, iPad Air 2, iPad Air (3rd generation), iPad Mini, iPad Mini 2, iPad Mini 3, iPad Mini 4, iPad Mini (5th generation), iPad Pro (1st generation), iPad Pro (2nd generation)

=== Smart Case ===
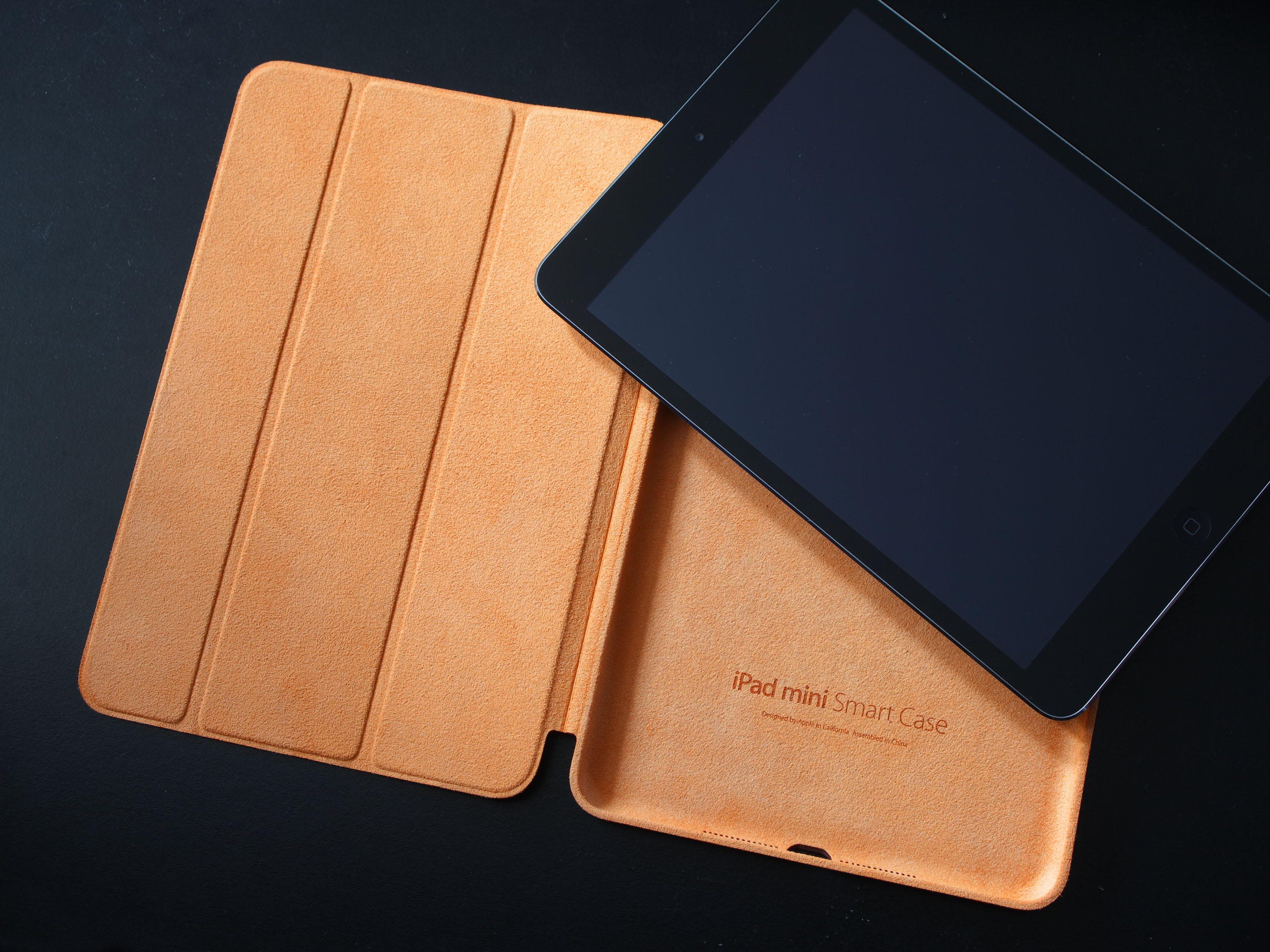

Similar to the Smart Cover, however includes an outer shell for extra protection. In 2013 Apple released an updated version of the smart case for iPad Air and iPad mini and discontinued all colors of the previous iPad generation smart case except for the Dark Gray color. In 2014, Apple announced an updated version of the smart case for the iPad Air 2 and discontinued all colors except black for the iPad Air smart cover.

Available for: iPad 2, iPad (3rd generation), iPad (4th generation), iPad Air, iPad Air 2, iPad Mini

=== Silicone Case ===
Available for: iPad Mini 4, iPad Mini (5th generation), iPad Pro (1st generation), iPad Pro (2nd generation)

=== Smart Folio ===
Available for: iPad Pro (3rd generation), iPad Pro (4th generation), iPad Pro (5th generation), iPad Pro (6th generation), iPad Air (4th generation), iPad Air (5th generation), iPad mini (6th generation), iPad (10th generation)

== Keyboards ==
=== Smart Keyboard ===
The Smart Keyboard is a standalone hardware keyboard designed for the iPad Pro. It is similar to a MacBook keyboard build into a Smart Cover, allowing it to serve as both a cover for the display, a stand, and a physical keyboard. With keys covered in woven fabric, the Smart Keyboard is resistant to water and other liquids. Measuring in at 4 mm thick, the Smart Keyboard does not include wires or standard keyboard components so it does not need to be charged. Instead, it is powered by the Smart Connector, a new port that's found on the iPad Pro, and recent iPad and iPad Air models.

Available for: iPad (7th generation), iPad (8th generation), iPad (9th generation), iPad Air (3rd generation), iPad Pro (1st generation), iPad Pro (2nd generation)

=== Smart Keyboard Folio ===
Available for: iPad Pro (3rd generation), iPad Pro (4th generation), iPad Pro (5th generation), iPad Air (4th generation), iPad Air (5th generation)

=== Magic Keyboard ===
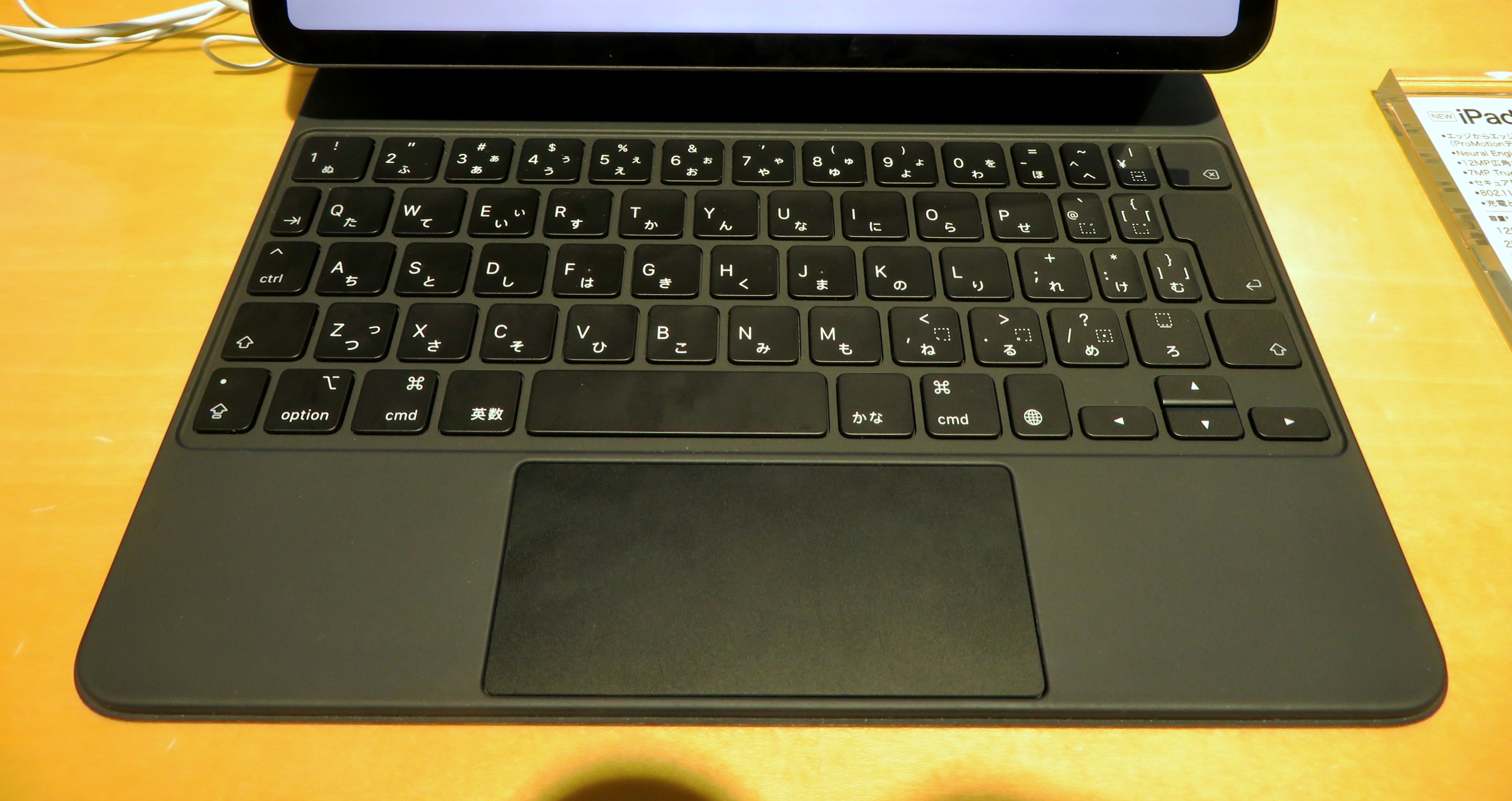

This version of the Magic Keyboard includes a trackpad and attaches magnetically to compatible iPads, with the iPad sitting on a cantilever that allows the viewing angle to be adjusted. Instead of a battery, it is powered directly by the attached iPad via that device's Smart Connector. The keyboard also has a USB-C port on its hinge for recharging the attached iPad, allowing the USB-C port on the iPad to be used for connecting other accessories.

=== Magic Keyboard Folio ===
The Magic Keyboard Folio is a computer keyboard for the iPad (10th generation), produced by Apple. It was announced on 18 October 2022 and deliveries started later that month. It is available alongside the Smart Keyboard and Smart Folio.

== Audio ==
=== EarPods ===
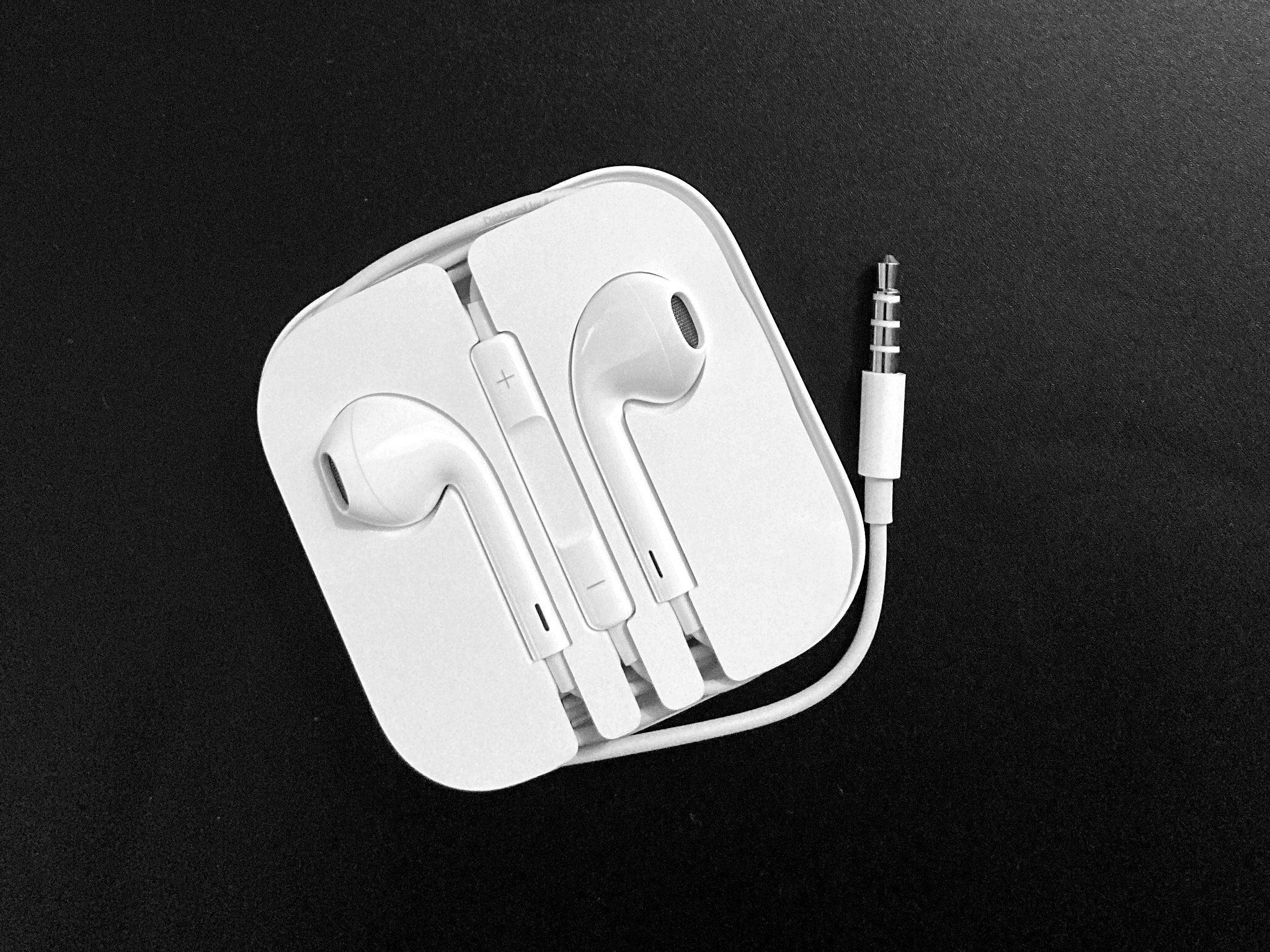

Designed to allow the wearer to use comfortable earbuds while listening to music. These headphones also come with a remote and microphone on the cord for use with all generations of iPad as well as iPhone and iPod Touch. Apple EarPods come in versions with a 3.5mm headphone jack, Lightning connector, or USB-C connector. These are dual armature type in-ear headphones.

=== AirPods ===
AirPods are wireless Bluetooth earbuds released by Apple in December 2016. In addition to playing music and relaying phone calls, AirPods have support for Apple's digital assistant, Siri, and a physical user interface which can detect taps and in-ear placement. AirPods include the proprietary Apple W1 SoC, whose additional connectivity functions require devices running iOS 10, macOS Sierra, watchOS 3, or later. AirPods (2nd generation) require iPads running iOS 12.2 or later. AirPods Pro require iPads running iPadOS 13.2 or later. AirPods Max require iPads running iPadOS 14.3 or later. AirPods (3rd generation) require iPads running iPadOS 15.1 or later.

== Apple Pencil ==
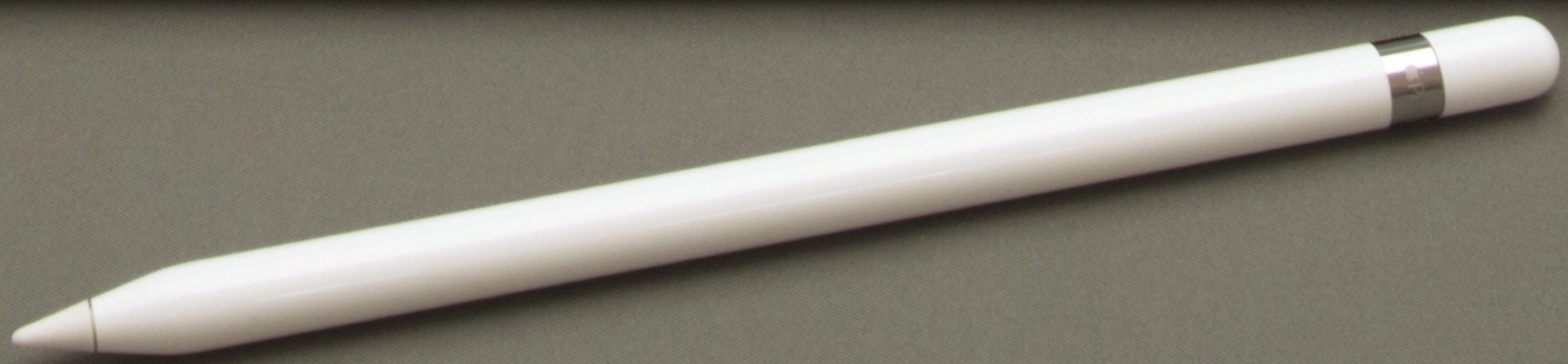

The Apple Pencil is a digital stylus pen that works as an input device for the iPad Pro tablet computer and was designed by Apple Inc. It was announced on September 9, 2015, alongside the iPad Pro and released in conjunction with it on November 11, 2015. A second generation Apple Pencil was announced October 30, 2018 alongside the iPad Pro (3rd generation).

== Cables ==
- Apple Digital AV Adapter: Released with iPad 2 and mirrors video output. This adapter allows the user to mirror anything on the iPad's (iPad 2 or later) screen to an HDTV or any other HDMI-compatible display, in up to 1080p, so that whatever the iPad's user does is viewable to the audience watching on the larger HDMI-compatible display. The Apple Digital AV Adapter connects to the iPad 2 or later or iPad 2 Dock via the 30-pin dock connector, whilst the other end has two connections; one is a 30-pin dock connector to charge/power the device whilst being used, the other is a HDMI-out for connecting to any HDMI-compatible display using an HDMI cable.
- Apple Composite AV Cable: Allows the iPad or iPad 2 to be connected to any TV or home cinema system to allow Movies and other videos to be watched in stereo sound only on a TV from the iPad or iPad 2. This is achieved by plugging the wires into the composite video and audio plugs in a TV or home cinema system and into the 30-pin connector on the iPad or iPad 2. However, it will not mirror the display.
- iPad VGA Adapter: Works similarly to the Digital AV adapter but outputs a video signal for a VGA display without audio or simultaneous charging. Video mirroring up to 1080p is supported on iPad 2 or later and 720p on the iPhone 4S. Slideshows and video up to 720p are output for iPad, iPhone 4 and iPod 4th Generation, but does not mirror the entire display. The original name 'iPad VGA adapter' was changed to 'Apple 30-pin to VGA Adapter' in anticipation of the lightning connector.
- iPad Camera Connection Kit: A kit of 2 adapters, one USB and one for SD cards. They copy the images from an external camera and import them to the iPad. This accessory is compatible with all generations of the iPad and will allow photos and videos to be transferred from an iPhone but not vice versa. Camera Connection kit can also be used to attach USB audio card or MIDI keyboard, even general keyboards for typing.
- iPad Power Cord: A 1.8 metres (5.9 ft) power cord that can be used to allow an iPad to be used while on charge as the power cord supplied is too short for this to be easily possible in most circumstances. Along with the cord, a wall adapter and a 30-pin dock connector, lightning connector, or USB-C connector cable is sold.

== Docks and adapters ==
- iPad Dock: Almost the same as the original iPad dock, however it is moulded specially for the design changes of the iPad 2, such as making the iPad thinner. It also includes a "Line Out" port in the back for speakers. This dock also works with the 3rd Generation iPad with the 0.6mm difference in thickness (the 3rd Generation being thicker) still allowing the 3rd Generation iPad to fit into the iPad 2 moulding. The dock was styled the iPad 2 Dock when the iPad 2 was the latest iPad available, however when the New iPad was released it was renamed 'iPad Dock'. The iPad Dock is not compatible with the fourth generation iPad, which uses the Lightning connector. There are two versions of the iPad Dock; One without the keyboard and one with the keyboard.
- Apple Lightning Digital AV Adapter
- Apple Lightning to VGA Adapter
- Apple Lightning to SD Card Camera Reader
- USB-C to Lightning Cable
- Lightning to USB Camera Adapter
- USB-C to USB Adapter
- USB-C VGA Multiport Adapter
- USB-C Digital AV Multiport Adapter
- USB-C to 3.5mm Headphone Jack Adapter: It lets you connect devices that use a standard 3.5 mm audio plug — like headphones or speakers — to your USB-C devices.
