= IPadOS 18 =

2024 tablet operating system by Apple

iPadOS 18
- Version of the iPadOS operating system
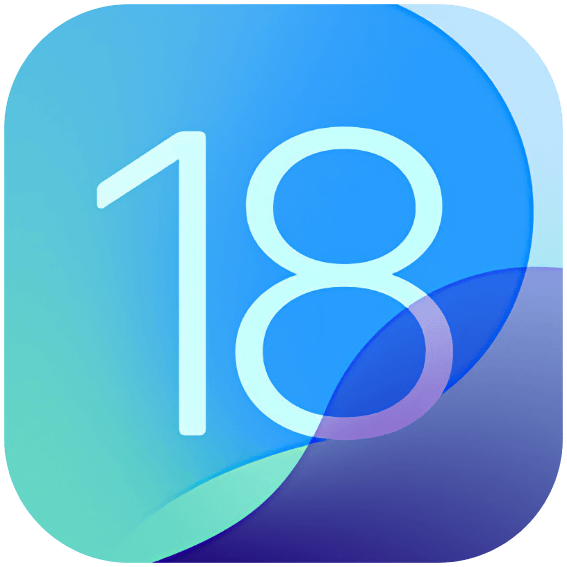

- iPadOS 18 home screen on an iPad Mini (A17 Pro) in Dark Mode
- Developer: Apple
- OS family: iPadOS
- Source model: Closed with open-source components
- Initial release: September 16, 2024; 2 years ago
- Latest release: 18.7.12 (7th-generation iPad only, other iPads redirected to iPadOS 26 or later) (November 9, 2026; 2 days ago) [±]
- Marketing target: iPad, iPad Mini, iPad Air, iPad Pro
- Update method: OTA, software update through iTunes, Apple Configurator, or Finder
- Preceded by: iPadOS 17
- Succeeded by: iPadOS 26
- Official website: iPadOS 18 at the Wayback Machine (archived August 31, 2025)
- Tagline: Totally. Rewrites. Rules.

Support status
- Obsolete, unsupported for newer iPads. Receiving security updates for iPads that are not supported by iPadOS 26 or later. Widespread third-party app support.

Articles in the series

iPadOS 18 is the sixth major release of Apple's iPadOS operating system for the iPad. It was revealed at the 2024 Worldwide Developers Conference (WWDC). It is the direct successor to iPadOS 17 and was announced alongside iOS 18, macOS Sequoia, visionOS 2, watchOS 11, and tvOS 18. It was released on September 16, 2024, and succeeded by iPadOS 26 on September 15, 2025.

iPadOS 18 is the first version of iPadOS to include Apple’s Calculator application for iPad, as well as Apple Intelligence.

iPadOS 18 is the final version of iPadOS that supports the seventh-generation iPad.

== System features ==
=== Apple Intelligence ===
The Apple Intelligence platform is available in iPadOS 18.1 and beyond on iPads that have an M1 SoC or later. Apple Intelligence also adds artificial intelligence (AI) capabilities and large language models, a new version of Siri, and other features, such as image creation tools.

=== Home screen ===
iPadOS 18 features many of the new home screen customization features introduced in iOS 18 such as icon tinting, dark themed icons, and the ability to move icons anywhere.

=== Calculator ===
iPadOS 18’s Calculator introduces Math Notes, a new feature that allows users to perform and track calculations on separate sheets, solve mathematical equations, and plot functions on graphs. With integrated handwriting recognition, Math Notes automatically evaluates user input and displays the results in their own handwriting. The redesigned Calculator app, now shared between iOS and iPadOS, marks the first time an official calculator has been available for iPad.

=== Control Center ===
Similarly to iOS 18, the Control Center is now more customizable with resizable buttons, shortcuts, and functions.

=== Notes ===
iPadOS's Notes app includes Smart Script which uses machine learning to model and straighten a user's handwriting. It can also generate additional handwritten text in the user's style.

The newly introduced Math Notes feature can be performed inside the Notes app and Smart Script can be used to write the answer of the calculation in the user's handwriting style.

=== Locking and hiding applications ===
In iPadOS 18, applications that are visible to the user can be locked, or hidden. Locked apps require passcode or biometric authentication to run. Hidden apps are moved to a designated "Hidden" folder in the App Library; accessing that folder requires passcode or biometric authentication.

== Issues ==
=== iPad Pro (M4) bricking issues ===
Many users trying to upgrade iPad Pro models with M4 chips to iPadOS 18.0 reported that the device powered off during the update process, causing the iPad to become bricked. Apple pulled the update and blocked installation and restoration to iPadOS 18.0 on M4 iPad Pros. On October 3, 2024, Apple released iPadOS 18.0.1, which allowed iPad Pro with M4 chips to update to iPadOS 18 without potential bricking issues.

=== In-app purchasing blockage ===
During the iPadOS 18.2 update on December 11, 2024, many users were unable to make in-app purchases, gaining much of its notoriety. This issue was fixed after the release of iPadOS 18.3 in late January 2025.

== Supported devices ==
iPadOS 18 drops support for the sixth-generation iPad and the second-generation iPad Pro, which feature an A10 SoC and an A10X SoC, respectively. However, iPadOS 18 continues to support the seventh-generation iPad, which also features an A10 SoC. This marks the first time Apple has dropped support for an iPad while retaining support for another model featuring the same or a less powerful system on a chip. The version also drops support for all iPads that use the original 9.7-inch display size.

The seventh-generation iPad is the only supported iPad without Apple's Neural Engine, while the third-generation iPad Air is the only supported iPad with a 10.5-inch display.

The new Apple Intelligence functions require iPads with an A17 Pro SoC, or an M1 SoC or later, which are only available on the iPad Mini (seventh generation or later), iPad Air (fifth generation or later), and iPad Pro (fifth generation or later).

iPads with an A10 SoC have limited support.

iPads with an A12, A13, A14, A15, or A16 SoC have features that are not supported on older iPads.

iPads with an A12X, A12Z, or A17 Pro SoC have partial support.

iPads with an M-series SoC have full support.

iPads that support iPadOS 18 are:

Device	Supported	Apple Intelligence support
iPad (7th generation)	Yes	No
iPad (8th generation)	Yes	No
iPad (9th generation)	Yes	No
iPad (10th generation)	Yes	No
iPad (A16)	Yes	No
iPad Mini (5th generation)	Yes	No
iPad Mini (6th generation)	Yes	No
iPad Mini (A17 Pro)	Yes	Yes
iPad Air (3rd generation)	Yes	No
iPad Air (4th generation)	Yes	No
iPad Air (5th generation)	Yes	Yes
iPad Air (M2)	Yes	Yes
iPad Air (M3)	Yes	Yes
iPad Pro 11-inch (1st gen) and 12.9-inch (3rd gen)	Yes	No
iPad Pro 11-inch (2nd gen) and 12.9-inch (4th gen)	Yes	No
iPad Pro 11-inch (3rd gen) and 12.9-inch (5th gen)	Yes	Yes
iPad Pro 11-inch (4th gen) and 12.9-inch (6th gen)	Yes	Yes
iPad Pro 11-inch (M4) and 13-inch (M4)	Yes	Yes

== Version history ==
The first developer beta of iPadOS 18 was released on June 10, 2024.

iPadOS 18 releases
Version	Build	Release date	Release notes
18.0	22A3354	September 16, 2024	Developer release notes
18.0	22A8350	October 23, 2024	Initial release for iPad Mini (A17 Pro)
18.0.1	22A3370	October 3, 2024	
18.0.1	22A8380	October 22, 2024	iPad Mini (A17 Pro) only
18.1	22B83	October 28, 2024	Developer release notes
18.1.1	22B91	November 19, 2024	
18.2	22C152	December 11, 2024	Developer release notes
18.2.1	22C161	January 6, 2025	
18.3	22D63	January 27, 2025	Developer release notes
18.3.1	22D72	February 10, 2025	
18.3.2	22D82	March 11, 2025	
18.4	22E240	March 31, 2025	Developer release notes
18.4.1	22E252	April 16, 2025	
18.5	22F76	May 12, 2025	Developer release notes
18.6	22G86	July 29, 2025	Developer release notes
18.6.1	22G90	August 14, 2025	Available as an IPSW only.
18.6.2	22G100	August 20, 2025	
18.7	22H20	September 15, 2025	Over-the-air for all iPads, IPSW only for iPad (7th generation)
18.7.1	22H31	September 29, 2025	Over-the-air for all iPads, IPSW only for iPad (7th generation)
18.7.2	22H124	November 5, 2025	Over-the-air for all iPads, IPSW only for iPad (7th generation)
18.7.3	22H217	December 12, 2025	Over-the-air for all iPads, IPSW only for iPad (7th generation)
18.7.4	22H218	January 26, 2026	iPad (7th and 8th generations) only.
18.7.5	22H311	February 11, 2026	iPad (7th generation) only.
18.7.7	22H333	March 24, 2026	iPad (7th generation) only.
18.7.7	22H340	April 1, 2026	OTA for all iPads, IPSW for only iPad (7th generation) and iPad (9th generation).
18.7.8	22H352	April 22, 2026	OTA for all iPads, IPSW for only iPad (7th generation) and iPad (8th generation).
18.7.9	22H355	May 11, 2026	iPad (7th generation) only, IPSW released for iPad (8th generation).
18.7.10	22H374	August 17, 2026	iPad (7th generation) only for final build. Release Candidate IPSW was released for iPad (8th generation).
18.7.11	22H384	October 27, 2026	iPad (7th generation) only.
18.7.12	22H390	November 9, 2026	iPad (7th generation) only.
Legend: Unsupported Latest version Preview version

See Apple's official release notes and official security update contents.

== Reception ==
Reception of iPadOS 18 was mixed, with critics praising the new Math Notes feature in the Calculator app, the addition of Smart Script, and even more customization, but criticizing for its launch issues, support inconsistency, the anti-climax multitasking, and the gradual rollout of AI features.

== See also ==
- iOS 18
- macOS Sequoia
- tvOS 18
- watchOS 11
- visionOS 2
- Apple Intelligence
