= IPad Air (3rd generation) =

2019 tablet computer by Apple

iPad Air (3rd generation)

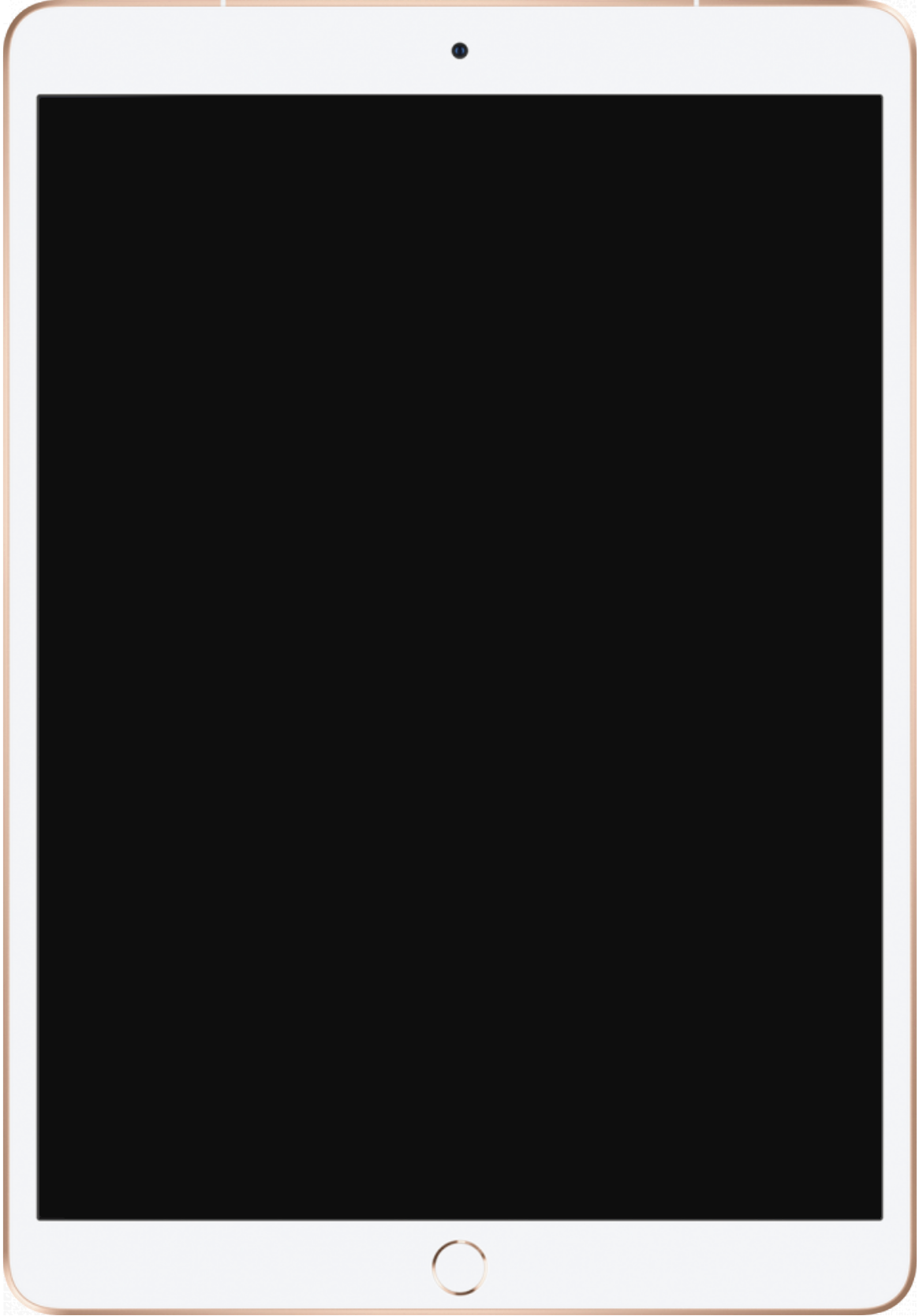
- iPad Air (3rd generation) in Gold
- Also known as: iPad Air 3, iPad Air (10.5-inch)
- Developer: Apple Inc.
- Product family: iPad Air
- Type: Tablet computer
- Generation: 3rd
- Released: March 18, 2019; 7 years ago
- Introductory price: $499 USD £479 GBP $649 CAD $779 AUD €549 EUR
- Discontinued: September 15, 2020; 6 years ago
- Operating system: Original: iOS 12.2; Current: iPadOS 26.7.2, released October 26, 2026
- System on a chip: Apple A12 Bionic with 64-bit architecture and Apple M12 motion co-processor
- CPU: 2.49 GHz Hexa-core (2x high performance Vortex + 4x high efficiency Tempest)
- Memory: 3 GB (LPDDR4X)
- Storage: 64 or 256 GB flash memory
- Display: 10.5 inches (270 mm) (2,224 x 1,668) px (264 ppi), 500-nits max brightness, wide-color display (P3), true tone display, fully laminated display, 1.8% reflectivity and Apple Pencil (1st generation) support
- Graphics: Apple-Designed 4-Core
- Sound: Stereo (both at bottom)
- Input: Multi-touch screen, headset controls, M12 motion co-processor, proximity and ambient light sensors, 3-axis accelerometer, 3-axis gyroscope, digital compass, dual microphone, Touch ID fingerprint reader, barometer
- Camera: Front: 7 MP, ƒ/2.2 aperture, burst mode, exposure control, face detection, auto-HDR, auto image stabilization, Retina flash, 1080p HD video recording Rear: 8 MP, ƒ/2.4 aperture, five-element lens, Hybrid IR filter, Live Photos, face detection, HDR, panorama, wide-color capture, timer mode, burst mode, 1080p HD 30fps video recording, video stabilization, slo-mo, time-lapse
- Connectivity: Wi-Fi and Wi-Fi + Cellular: Wi-Fi 802.11 a/b/g/n/ac at 2.4 GHz and 5 GHz and MIMO Bluetooth 5.0 Wi-Fi + Cellular: GPS & GLONASS GSM UMTS / HSDPA 850, 1700, 1800, 1900 MHz LTE Multiple bands 1, 2, 3, 4, 5, 7, 8, 11, 12, 13, 14, 17, 18, 19, 20, 21, 25, 26, 29, 30, 34, 38, 39, 40, 41, 46, 66, 71
- Power: 30.2 W·h, up to 10 hours of battery life.
- Online services: App Store, iTunes Store, Apple Books, iCloud, Game Center
- Dimensions: 250.6 mm (9.87 in) (h); 174.1 mm (6.85 in) (w); 6.1 mm (0.24 in) (d)
- Weight: Wi-Fi: 456 g (1.005 lb); Wi-Fi + Cellular: 464 g (1.023 lb)
- Predecessor: iPad Air 2
- Successor: iPad Air (4th generation)
- Related: iPad Mini (5th generation); iPad (7th generation)
- Website: https://www.apple.com/ipad-air/

The iPad Air (3rd generation) (colloquially referred to as iPad Air 3) is a tablet computer developed and marketed by Apple Inc. It was announced and released on March 18, 2019, alongside the 5th-generation iPad Mini.

The device was released five years after the previous iPad Air 2, as the 5th-generation iPad, released in 2017, continued the standard iPad lineup as the successor to the 4th-generation iPad (released in 2012) and was succeeded by the 6th-generation iPad, released in 2018. The third generation iPad Air was instead positioned as a new entry in the iPad Air lineup.

Its case design is identical to the iPad Pro 10.5 inch; internal hardware includes an upgraded Apple A12 Bionic SoC, a 10.5-inch Retina Display, 3 GB of LPDDR4X memory, and support for Bluetooth 5.0 and the first-generation Apple Pencil.

The iPad Air (3rd generation), as well as the 9th-generation iPad and the 5th-generation iPad Mini, are the last iPad models to use a Lightning port and a home button. The 3rd-generation iPad Air was discontinued on September 15, 2020, following the introduction of the 4th-generation iPad Air.

== Features ==
=== Hardware ===
The 3rd-generation iPad Air comes in three color options (Silver, Space Gray and Gold), with the gold color option changed to the gold style used on the iPhone 8.

It features an upgraded, 7MP front camera (used first in the iPhone 7 and up to the iPhone XS), compared to the 1.2MP camera found in the previous generation. However, it retains the same, older 8MP rear camera which cannot record in 4K video as such.

It uses the Apple A12 Bionic chip, a 2.49GHz six-core processor, which has a 66% faster clock speed than the 1.5GHz triple-core Apple A8X in the iPad Air 2. It also has an improved display from the previous generation, including a P3 color gamut for more vibrant colours (improved from sRGB) and True Tone, which allows the display to adapt to ambient lighting to change its color and intensity in different environments.

This iPad Air retains the Lightning port and the headphone jack from the previous generation and is the final iPad Air model to do so; the 4th-generation Air does not have a headphone jack and uses USB-C instead. It is also the final iPad Air model available with white bezels; the 4th-generation Air uses black bezels only. It also has a slightly larger battery of 30.2 watt-hours (up from 27.6 W·h), rated by Apple to provide the same "10 hours" of active use.

=== Software ===
The 3rd-generation iPad Air first shipped with iOS 12.2. It supported iPadOS 13, iPadOS 14, iPadOS 15, iPadOS 16, iPadOS 17 and iPadOS 18. It currently supports iPadOS 26.

== Reception ==
The 3rd-generation iPad Air received positive reviews. It was praised for its laminated screen, Smart Keyboard case capability, as well as a speedy SoC. However, it only supports the 1st-generation Apple Pencil, uses the 2017's 10.5-inch iPad Pro design and only has two speakers compared to four on the Pro models. In addition, while the current Pro models provide some support for HDR, the 3rd-generation Air does not.

== Hardware issues ==
Some devices of this model, which were manufactured between March 2019 and October 2019, have issues where the screen may flicker or flash before permanently dying. As a result of this Apple released a recall program which allows users to send in their device for replacement up to two years from the date of purchase.

== Timeline ==
Timeline of iPad models
See also: List of Apple products

Source: Apple Newsroom Archive. Apple products use the convention 1 GB = one gigabyte (one billion bytes), meaning that 16, 32, 64 and 128 GB storage devices contain a total of 14.9, 29.8, 59.6 and 119.2 GiB, respectively. Formatting and apps take up some of this total storage, leaving 11.5, 27.5, 56.5 and 114 GiB available to the user.

Preceded by iPad Air 2	iPad Air (3rd generation); 2019	Succeeded by iPad Air (4th generation)
