= IPadOS 17 =

2023 tablet operating system by Apple

iPadOS 17
- Version of the iPadOS operating system

- Screenshot of the iPadOS 17 home screen
- Developer: Apple
- OS family: iPadOS
- Working state: No longer supported
- Source model: Closed with open-source components
- General availability: September 18, 2023; 3 years ago
- Latest release: 17.7.11 (iPad Pro 12.9-inch 2nd generation, iPad Pro 10.5-inch, and iPad 6th generation only) (May 11, 2026; 6 months ago) [±]
- Marketing target: iPad, iPad Mini, iPad Air, iPad Pro
- Update method: OTA, software update through iTunes, Apple Configurator, or Finder
- Package manager: App Store
- License: Proprietary software with open-source components
- Preceded by: iPadOS 16
- Succeeded by: iPadOS 18
- Official website: iPadOS 17 at the Wayback Machine (archived September 3, 2024)
- Tagline: Even more capable. Even more you.

Support status
- Obsolete, unsupported

Articles in the series

iPadOS 17 is the fifth major release of the iPadOS operating system developed by Apple for its iPad line of tablet computers. The successor to iPadOS 16, it was announced at the company's Worldwide Developers Conference (WWDC) on June 5, 2023, and was released on September 18, 2023, along with iOS 17.

The first public beta was released on July 12, 2023, and the final version was released on September 18, 2023.

== Features ==
=== Lock screen ===
- The lock screen has been redesigned to match the appearance of iOS 16 and iOS 17 with widgets.

=== PDF document handling ===
- iPadOS can now identify PDF form fields for quicker text input.

=== Siri ===
- Users can now simply address Siri by its name instead of having to say "Hey Siri" to activate it.

=== Health ===
- The Health app is now available on iPads as well as on iPhones.

=== Notes ===
- The Notes app now supports real time collaboration between users in PDF documents.

=== Automatic verification codes ===
- Adds support for one-time verification codes in the Mail app.
- Adds feature to automatically delete verification codes.

== Supported devices ==
iPadOS 17 requires iPads with an A10 Fusion chip or later. It drops support for iPads with the A9 (Note: iPad (5th generation)) and A9X (Note: iPad Pro, 9.7 inch iPad Pro, 12.9 inch (1st generation)) chips, marking the end of support for iPads without Apple Pencil support. iPadOS 17 is the final version of iPadOS that supports the second-generation iPad Pro and an iPad with the original 9.7-inch display, the sixth-generation iPad.

iPadOS 17 drops support for the first-generation iPad Pro and the fifth-generation iPad, making it the first version of iPadOS to drop support for an iPad Pro.

iPadOS 17 is the first version of iPadOS to drop support for an iPad with the 12.9-inch display and Apple Pencil compatibility. This also marks the third time Apple has dropped support for 64-bit iPads. The sixth-generation iPad is the only supported iPad with the original 9.7-inch display and 2 GB of RAM.

iPads with the A10 (Note: iPad (6th generation) iPad (7th generation)) or A10X (Note: iPad Pro, 10.5 inch iPad Pro, 12.9 inch (2nd generation)) chip have limited support.

iPads with the A12, (Note: iPad (8th generation) iPad Air (3rd generation) iPad Mini (5th generation)) A13, (Note: iPad (9th generation)) A14 (Note: iPad (10th generation) iPad Air (4th generation)) or A15 (Note: iPad Mini (6th generation)) chip have partial support. (Note: Excludes certain features such as Stage Manager which is limited to devices with M series chips.)

iPads with the A12X (Note: iPad Pro, 11 inch (1st generation) iPad Pro, 12.9 inch (3rd generation)) or A12Z (Note: iPad Pro, 11 inch (2nd generation) iPad Pro, 12.9 inch (4th generation)) almost have full support. (Note: Stage Manager only has a single screen on these iPads.)

iPads with the M1, (Note: iPad Air (5th generation) iPad Pro, 11 inch (3rd generation) iPad Pro, 12.9 inch (5th generation)) M2 (Note: iPad Pro, 11 inch (4th generation) iPad Pro, 12.9 inch (6th generation) iPad Air (6th generation)) or M4 (Note: iPad Pro, 11 inch (5th generation) iPad Pro, 13 inch) chip have full support.

iPads that support iPadOS 17 are:

- iPad (6th generation) or later
- iPad Air (3rd generation) or later
- iPad Mini (5th generation) or later
- iPad Pro 12.9-inch (2nd generation) or later
- iPad Pro 10.5-inch
- iPad Pro 11-inch (1st generation) or later
- iPad Pro 13-inch (M4)

== Version history ==
The first developer beta of iPadOS 17 was released on June 6, 2023. The first public release, iPadOS 17.0, was officially released on September 18, 2023.

Version	Build	Codename	Release date	Release notes
17.0	21A329	Dawn	September 18, 2023	
17.0.1	21A340	Dawn	September 21, 2023	
17.0.2	21A351	Dawn	September 26, 2023	
17.0.3	21A360	Dawn	October 4, 2023	
17.1	21B74	DawnB	October 25, 2023	
17.1.1	21B91	DawnB	November 7, 2023	
17.1.2	21B101	DawnB	November 30, 2023	
17.2	21C62	DawnC	December 11, 2023	
17.3	21D50	DawnD	January 22, 2024	
17.3.1	21D61	DawnD	February 8, 2024	
17.4	21E219	DawnE	March 5, 2024	
17.4.1	21E236	DawnE	March 21, 2024	
17.5	21F79	DawnF	May 13, 2024	
17.5.1	21F90	DawnF	May 20, 2024	
17.6	21G80	DawnG	July 29, 2024	
17.6.1	21G93	DawnG	August 7, 2024	
17.6.1	21G101	DawnG	August 19, 2024	
17.7	21H16	DawnSecurityCrystal	September 16, 2024	
17.7.1	21H216	DawnSecurityCrystalB	October 28, 2024	
17.7.2	21H221	DawnSecurityCrystalB	November 19, 2024	
17.7.3	21H312	DawnSecurityCrystalC	December 11, 2024	Only available for devices not supported by iPadOS 18: 6th generation iPad and 2nd generation iPad Pro
17.7.4	21H414	DawnUpdate	January 27, 2025	Only available for devices not supported by iPadOS 18: 6th generation iPad and 2nd generation iPad Pro
17.7.5	21H420	DawnUpdate	February 10, 2025	Only available for devices not supported by iPadOS 18: 6th generation iPad and 2nd generation iPad Pro
17.7.6	21H423	DawnUpdate	March 31, 2025	Only available for devices not supported by iPadOS 18: 6th generation iPad and 2nd generation iPad Pro
17.7.7	21H433	DawnUpdate	May 12, 2025	Only available for devices not supported by iPadOS 18: 6th generation iPad and 2nd generation iPad Pro
17.7.8	21H440	DawnUpdate	May 19, 2025	Only available for devices not supported by iPadOS 18: 6th generation iPad and 2nd generation iPad Pro
17.7.9	21H446	DawnUpdate	July 29, 2025	Only available for devices not supported by iPadOS 18: 6th generation iPad and 2nd generation iPad Pro
17.7.10	21H450	DawnUpdate	August 20, 2025	Only available for devices not supported by iPadOS 18: 6th generation iPad and 2nd generation iPad Pro
17.7.11	21H461	DawnUpdate	May 11, 2026	Only available for devices not supported by iPadOS 18: 6th generation iPad and 2nd generation iPad Pro
Legend: Unsupported Latest version Preview version

See Apple's official release notes and official security update contents.

== Reception ==
Reception of iPadOS 17 was positive, with critics praising the lock screen customization feature, Stage Manager improvements, the addition of the Health app, the ability to work with PDFs within the Notes app, the addition of enhanced AutoFill and external camera support, but criticizing it for its lack of revolutionary changes, hardware limitations and lack of multi-user support.

== See also ==
- iOS 17
- macOS Sonoma
- tvOS 17
- watchOS 10
