= Apple A9 =

System-on-a-chip designed by Apple Inc.

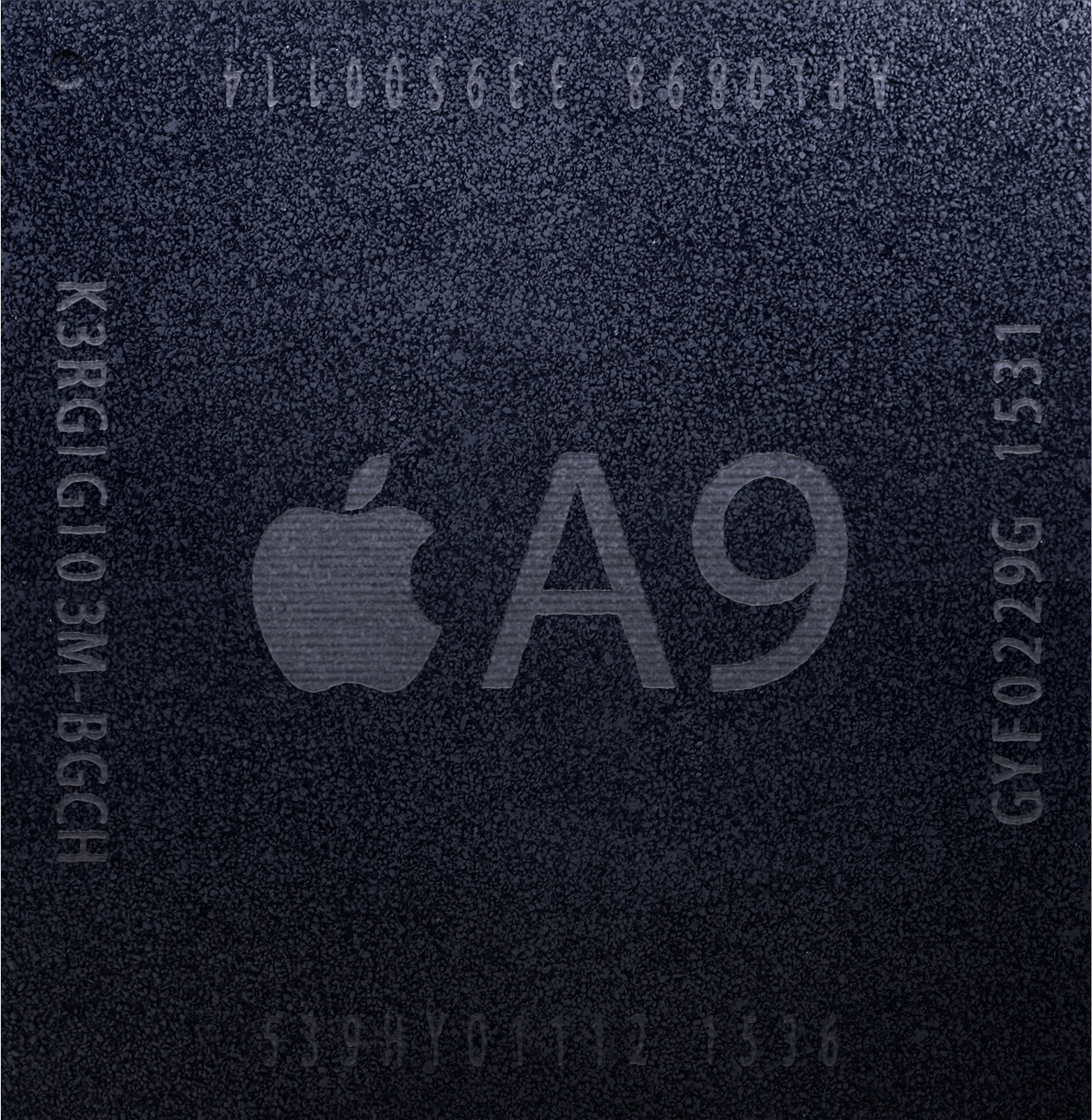
- Apple A9 processor

General information
- Launched: September 9, 2015
- Discontinued: September 12, 2018
- Designed by: Apple Inc.
- Common manufacturer: TSMC, Samsung
- Product code: APL0898, APL1022

Performance
- Max. CPU clock rate: 1.85 GHz (iPhone 6s, iPhone 6s Plus, iPhone SE, iPad 9.7 2017)

Physical specifications
- Cores: 2
- GPU: Custom PowerVR Series 7XT (six-core) @ 650MHz

Cache
- L1 cache: Per core: 64 KB instruction + 64 KB data
- L2 cache: 3 MB shared
- L3 cache: 4 MB shared

Architecture and classification
- Application: Mobile
- Technology node: 14 nm (Samsung 14LPE), 16 nm (TSMC 16FFC)
- Microarchitecture: Twister
- Instruction set: ARMv8-A: A64, A32, T32

Products, models, variants
- Variant: Apple A9X

History
- Predecessors: Apple A8 (iPhone); Apple A8X (iPad)
- Successors: Apple A10 Fusion (iPhone); Apple A10X Fusion (iPad)

The Apple A9 is a 64-bit ARM-based system-on-chip (SoC) designed by Apple Inc., part of the Apple silicon series. Manufactured for Apple by both TSMC and Samsung, it first appeared in the iPhone 6s and 6s Plus which were introduced on September 9, 2015. Apple states that it has 70% more CPU performance and 90% more graphics performance compared to its predecessor, the Apple A8. Production of A9 chips ended when the iPhone 6s, iPhone 6s Plus and first-generation iPhone SE was discontinued on September 12, 2018.

The latest software update for the iPhone 6s, 6s Plus and first generation SE is iOS 15.8.8, released on May 11, 2026, as they were discontinued with the release of iOS 16 in 2022, and for the iPad (5th generation) using this chip was iPadOS 16.7.16, released on the same date, as it was discontinued with the release of iPadOS 17 in 2023.

== Design ==
The A9 features an Apple-designed 64-bit 1.85 GHz ARMv8-A dual-core CPU called Twister. The A9 has a per-core L1 cache of 64 KB for data and 64 KB for instructions, an L2 cache of 3 MB shared by both CPU cores, and a 4 MB L3 cache that services the entire SoC and acts as a victim cache. The A9 also features a custom PowerVR Series7XT @ 650 MHz GPU, featuring 6x custom shader cores and compiler from Apple.

The A9 includes a new image processor, a feature originally introduced in the A5 and last updated in the A7, with better temporal and spatial noise reduction as well as improved local tone mapping. The A9 directly integrates an embedded M9 motion coprocessor, a feature originally introduced with the A7 as a separate chip. In addition to servicing the accelerometer, gyroscope, compass, and barometer, the M9 coprocessor can recognize Siri voice commands.

The A9 has video codec encoding support for H.264. It has decoding support for HEVC, H.264, MPEG‑4, and Motion JPEG.

The A9 features a custom storage solution, which uses an Apple-designed NVMe-based controller that communicates over a PCIe connection. The iPhone 6s' NAND design is more akin to a PC-class SSD than embedded flash memory common on mobile devices. This gives the phone a significant storage performance advantage over competitors which often use eMMC or UFS to connect to their flash memory.

=== Microarchitecture ===
The A9's microarchitecture is similar to the second generation Cyclone (used in A8 chip) microarchitecture. Some of the microarchitectural features are as follows:

Pipeline depth (stages)	16
Issue width	6 micro-ops
ROB	196 micro-ops
Load latency	8 cycles
Branch misprediction penalty	9
Number of integer pipes	4
Number of shifter ALUs	4
Load/Store Units	2
Integer pipe buffer size	48
Number of branch units	2
Indirect branch units	1
Branch pipe buffer size	24
FP ALUs	3

About half of the performance boost over A8 comes from the 1.85 GHz frequency. About a quarter comes from the better memory subsystem (3× bigger caches). The remaining quarter comes from the microarchitectural tuning.

=== Encryption ===
According to Apple, "Every iOS device has a dedicated AES-256 crypto engine built into the DMA path between the flash storage and main system memory, making file encryption highly efficient. On A9 or later A-series processors, the flash storage subsystem is on an isolated bus that is only granted access to memory containing user data via the DMA crypto engine."

=== Dual sourcing (Chipgate) ===
Apple A9 chips are fabricated by two companies: Samsung and TSMC. The Samsung version is called APL0898, which is manufactured on a 14 nm FinFET process and is 96 mm^{2} large, while the TSMC version is called APL1022, which is manufactured on a 16 nm FinFET process and is 104.5 mm^{2} large.

There was intended to be no significant difference in performance between the parts, but in October 2015, it was found that iPhone 6S models with Samsung-fabricated A9 chips consistently measured shorter battery life than those with TSMC-fabricated versions in CPU heavy usage; web browsing and graphics were not very different. Apple responded that "tests which run the processors with a continuous heavy workload until the battery depletes are not representative of real-world usage", and said that internal testing combined with customer data demonstrated a variance of only 2–3%.

=== Naming ===
While the Twister CPU core implements the ARMv8-A instruction set architecture licensed from ARM Holdings, it is an independent CPU design and is unrelated to the much older but similarly named Cortex-A9 and ARM9 CPU that are designed by ARM themselves and implement the 32-bit ARMv7-A and ARMv5E versions of the architecture.

=== Gallery ===
The processors are nearly identical visually. The packaging have the same dimensions (approx 15.0×14.5 mm) and only superficial differences, like the designation text. Inside the packaging the silicon die differs in size.

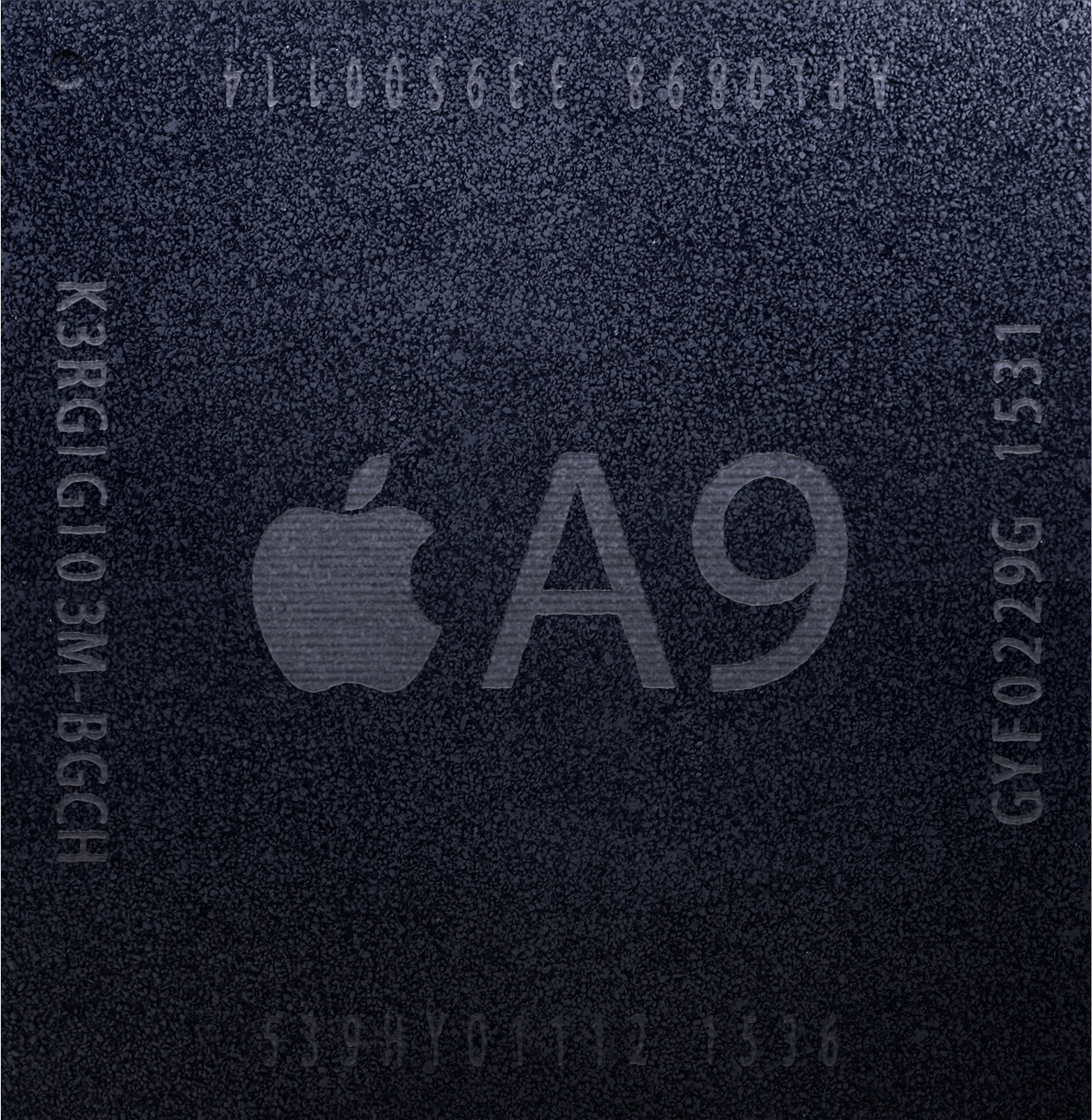
APL0898, the Samsung version of the A9

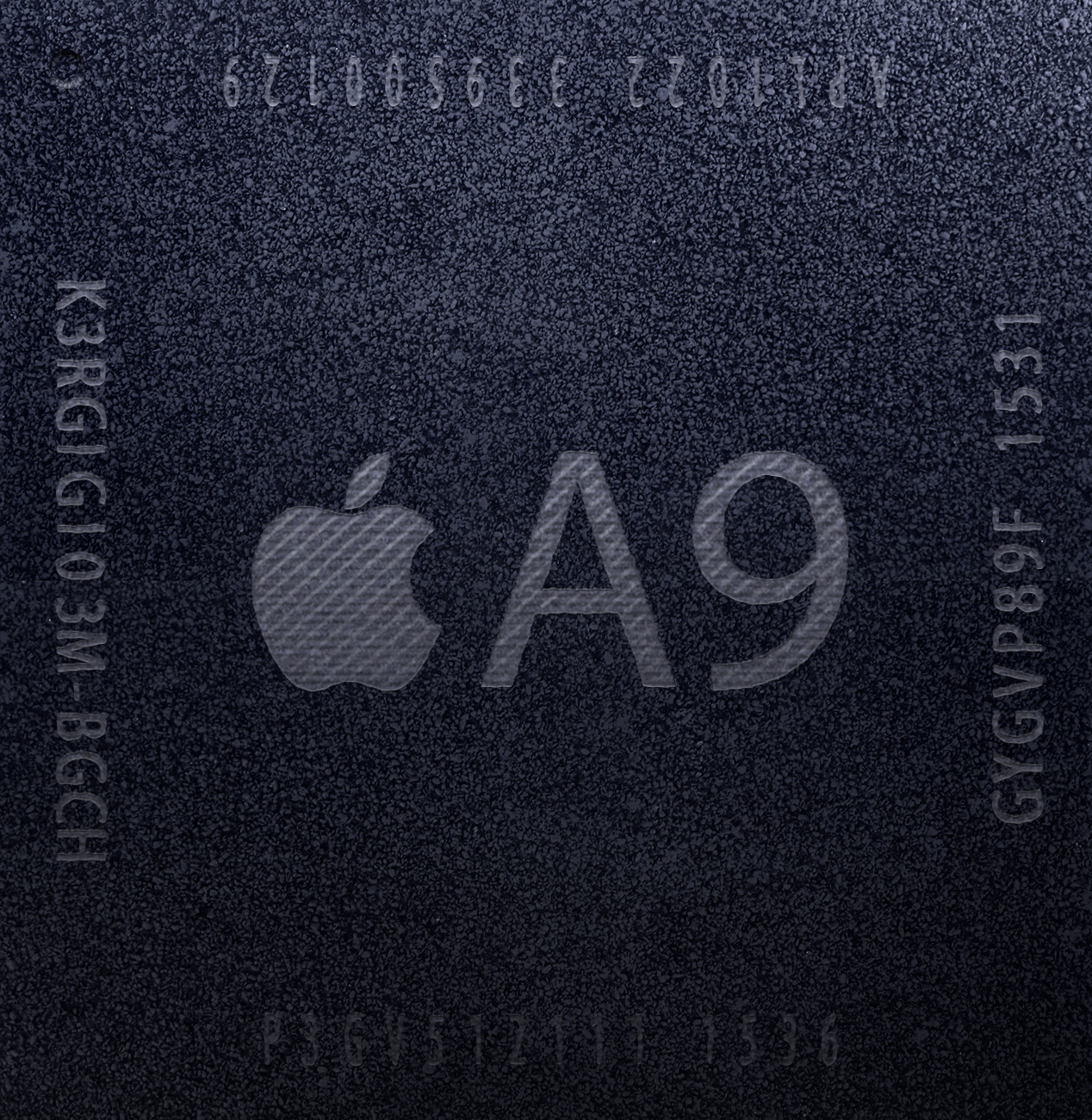
APL1022, the TSMC version of the A9

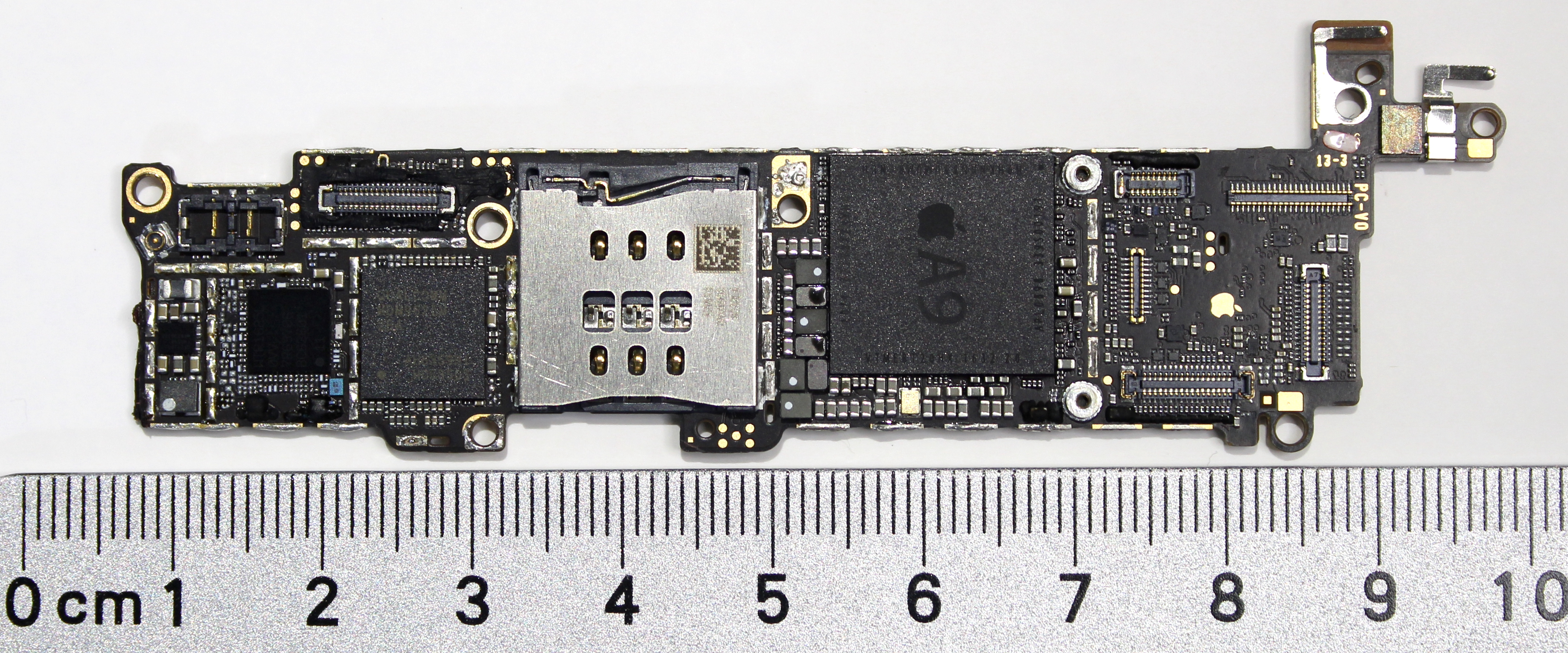
A9 (APL0898) SoC on iPhone 6s main logic board

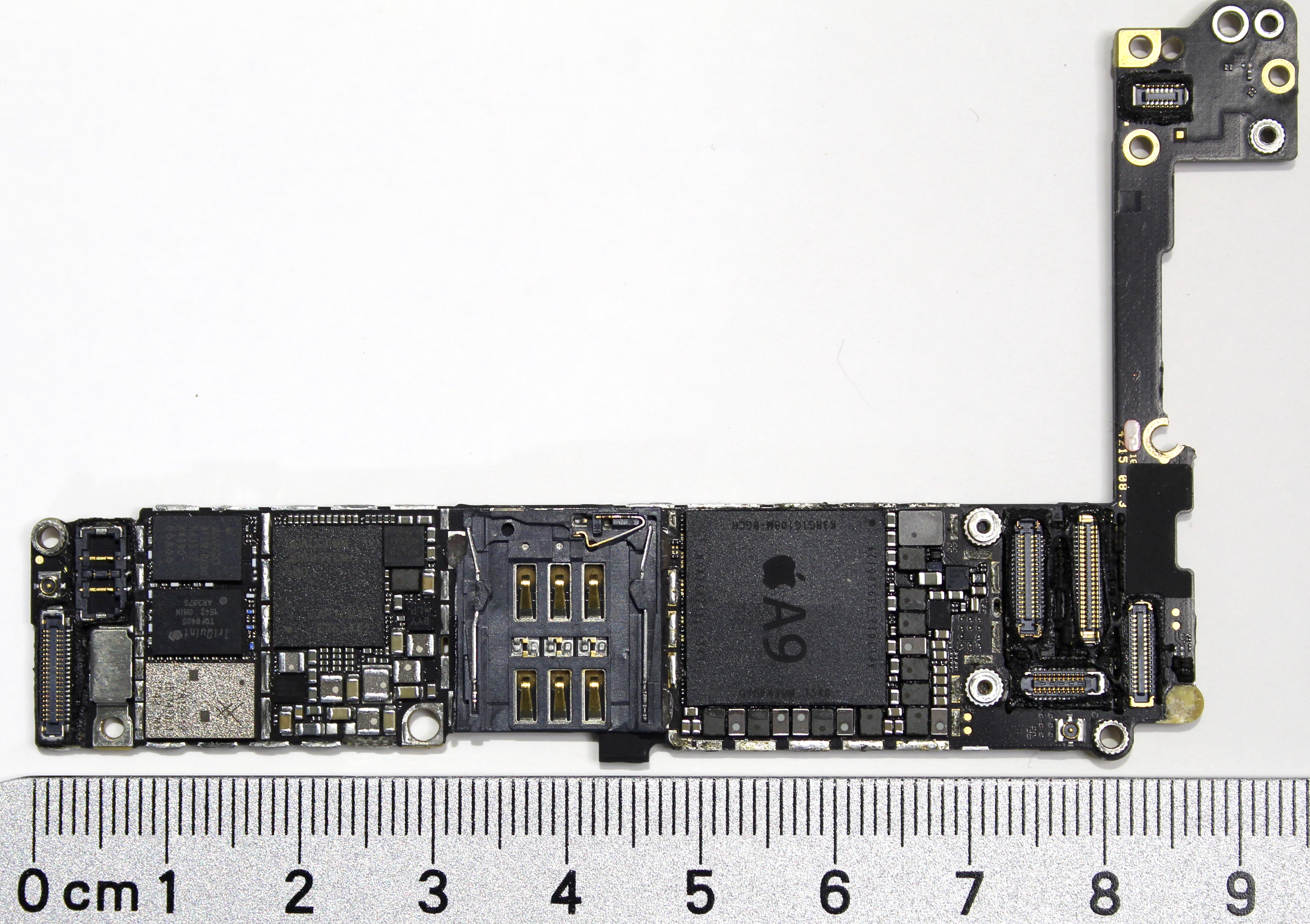
A9 (APL1022) SoC on iPhone SE main logic board

=== ARKit ===
The A9 processor is listed as the minimum requirement for ARKit.

== Products that include the Apple A9 ==
- iPhone 6s & 6s Plus
- iPhone SE (1st generation)
- iPad (5th generation)

== See also ==
- Apple silicon, the range of ARM-based processors designed by Apple.
- Apple A9X

Preceded by Apple A8	Apple A9; 2015	Succeeded by Apple A10 Fusion
