= IPad (8th generation) =

Tablet computer sold by Apple between 2020 and 2021

iPad

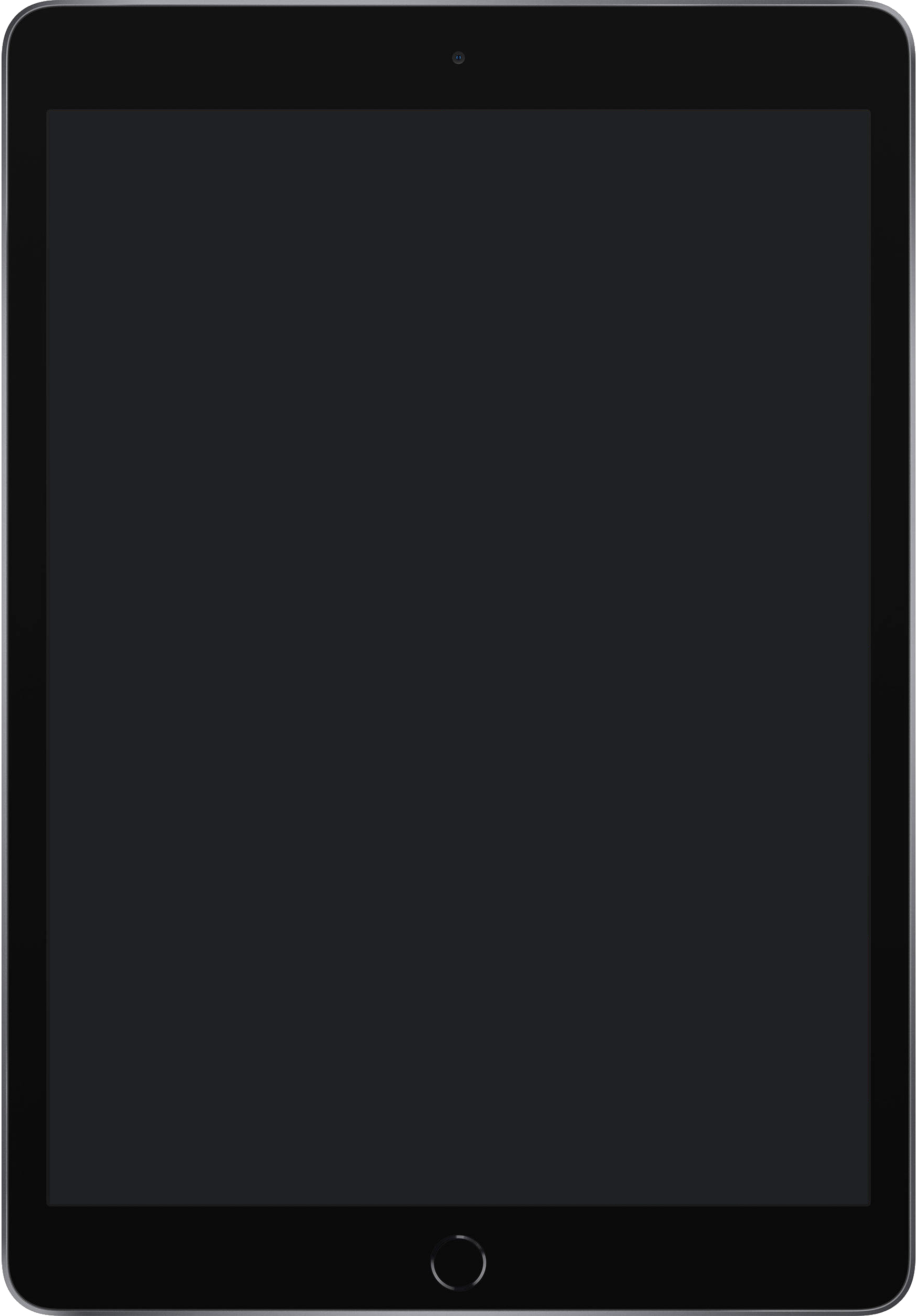
- iPad (8th generation) in Space Gray
- Also known as: iPad (8th generation), iPad 10.2 in (260 mm), iPad 8, iPad (10.2 in (260 mm)) (2nd generation), iPad (2020)
- Developer: Apple
- Manufacturer: Foxconn
- Product family: iPad
- Type: Tablet computer
- Generation: 8th
- Released: September 18, 2020; 6 years ago
- Introductory price: US$329
- Discontinued: September 14, 2021; 5 years ago
- Operating system: Original: iPadOS 14; Current: iPadOS 26.7.2, released October 26, 2026
- System on a chip: Apple A12 Bionic with 64-bit desktop architecture and Apple M12 motion co-processor
- CPU: Hexa-core 64-bit @ Hexa-core (2x2.5 GHz Vortex + 4x1.6 GHz Tempest)
- Memory: 3 GB LPDDR4X SDRAM
- Storage: 32 or 128 GB (Note: 1 GB = 1 billion bytes)
- Display: 10.2 inches (260 mm) 2,160 × 1,620 px (264 ppi) with a 4:3 aspect ratio, 500 nits max brightness (typical)
- Graphics: Apple GPU 4-Core Graphics
- Sound: Stereo
- Input: Multi-touch screen, headset controls, proximity and ambient light sensors, 3-axis accelerometer, 3-axis gyroscope, digital compass, dual microphone, Touch ID fingerprint reader, barometer
- Camera: Front: 1.2 MP, 720p HD, ƒ/2.4 aperture Rear: 8.0 MP AF, iSight with Five Element Lens, Hybrid IR filter, video stabilization, face detection, Smart HDR, ƒ/2.4 aperture
- Power: 32.4 Wh, up to 10 hours of battery life
- Online services: App Store, iTunes Store, iBookstore, iCloud, Game Center
- Dimensions: 250.6 mm (9.87 in) H 174.1 mm (6.85 in) W 7.5 mm (0.30 in) D
- Weight: Wi-Fi: 490 g (1.08 lb); Wi-Fi + Cellular: 495 g (1.091 lb)
- Predecessor: iPad (7th generation)
- Successor: iPad (9th generation)
- Related: iPad Air (3rd generation) iPad mini (5th generation)
- Website: iPad 10.2-inch - Apple at the Wayback Machine (archived September 13, 2021)

The eighth-generation iPad (also referred to as the iPad 10.2-inch (2020)) is a tablet developed and marketed by Apple as the successor to the 7th-generation iPad. It was announced on September 15, 2020, and released on September 18, 2020.

This iPad retains the 10.2 in (260 mm) Retina display from its predecessor, the seventh-generation iPad, along with Apple Pencil (1st generation) compatibility and Smart Keyboard compatibility, though it now includes a faster A12 Bionic processor, with a Neural Engine, making it the first entry-level iPad to have a Neural Engine.

The eighth-generation iPad is the last iPad to feature 32 GB of internal storage. Its successor, the 9th generation, was released on September 24, 2021.

== Features ==
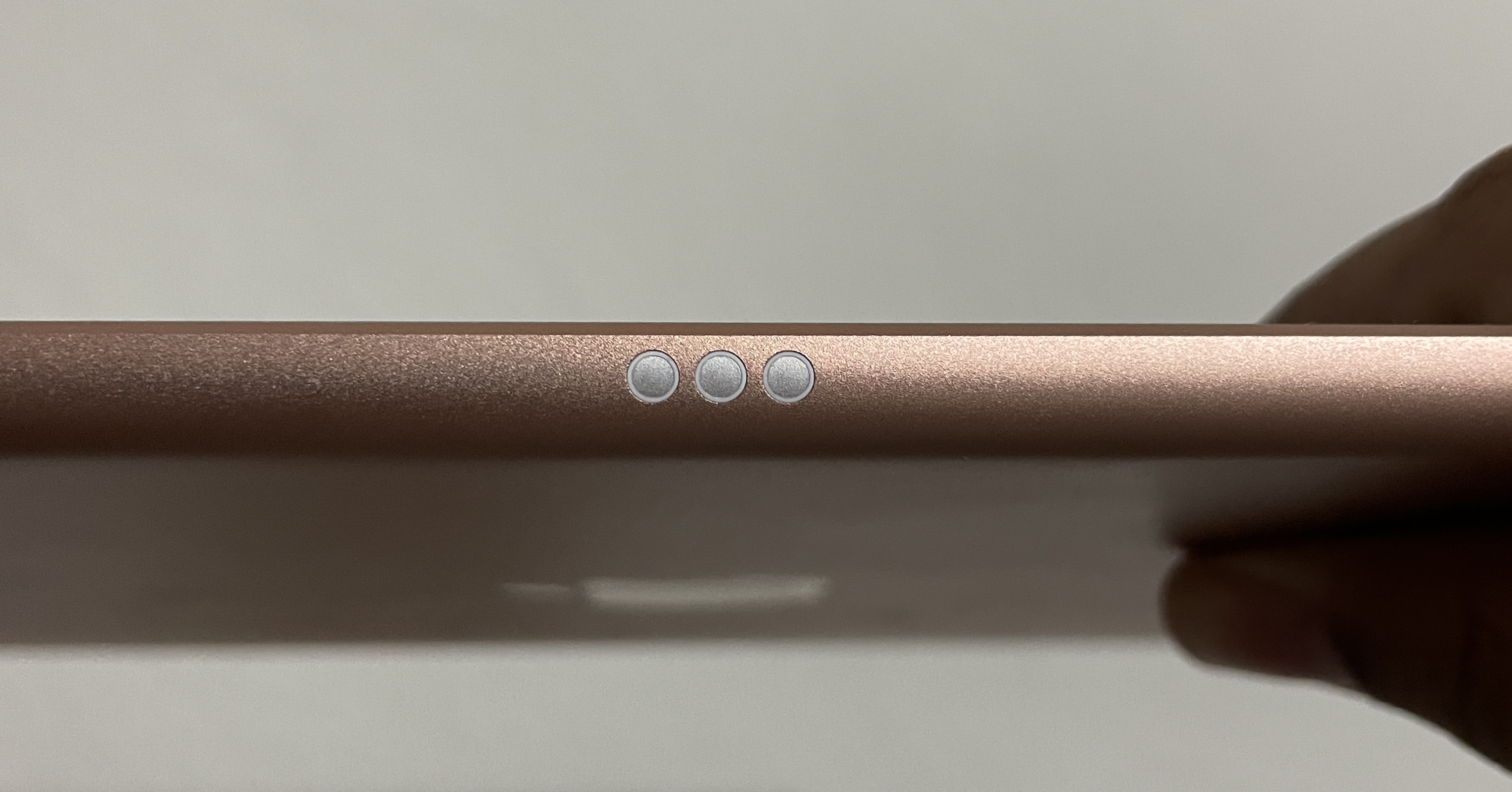
Smart Connector

The eighth-generation iPad uses the same design as the seventh-generation iPad, with a 10.2 in (260 mm) screen with 1620 by 2160 pixels at a pixel density of 264-pixel PPI, Touch ID support, and compatibility with the Smart Connector.

It uses the Apple A12 chip, which Apple claims provides a 40% faster 6-core CPU and a 2x faster 4 core GPU compared to the processor of the previous generation. It is the first model in Apple's entry level iPad lineup to include a Neural Engine, a component introduced with the A11 processor. It is the final iPad tablet available with white bezels on the Silver and Gold models; all iPad (9th generation) tablets come with black bezels.

The eighth-generation iPad is compatible with the first-generation Apple Pencil, the Smart Keyboard and keyboard attachments compatible with the Smart Connector.

It was released running iPadOS 14, with iPadOS 15 unveiled later at WWDC21 and iPadOS 16 announced at WWDC22.

== Reception ==
Miles Somerville of 9to5Mac found the tablet to be a good value proposition at its price point. He described it as having a nearly identical appearance to its predecessor, but with improved battery life, enhanced performance owing to the upgrade from the A10 Fusion to the A12 Bionic, and better screen sensitivity for Apple Pencil use, while continuing the poor implementation of Pencil charging on a perpendicular direction from the tablet's Lightning port. He found it sufficient for basic activities, gaming, everyday content consumption, and general multitasking, although not measuring up to the 2020 iPad Pro or the simultaneously released fourth-generation iPad Air, in part due to its display that supports only a 60 Hz refresh rate instead of 120 Hz. He especially faulted Apple's choice of keeping a 1.2-megapixel camera on the front of the tablet, which could be a strong negative factor for an intended audience of students, who might plan to use the device for teleconference classes over platforms such as Zoom.

Scott Stein of CNET rated the tablet 8.1 out of 10. Stein commended it for its faster processing that handled iPadOS better than previous models, better support for Apple Pencil and keyboard cases, and a faster charger included in the box. He faulted it for the large bezels that lead to a cramped feel of its screen during multitasking with two apps open, lack of support for the second-generation Apple Pencil and newer Magic Keyboard cases, the outdated 720p camera that does not function well in landscape mode teleconferencing because of placement, the display limited to a 60 Hz refresh rate and lacking True Tone color temperature auto-adjustment, and the insufficient 32 gigabytes of storage for the entry-level model.

David Price of Macworld UK echoed many of the other critiques while noting that this model of iPad would find an audience among average consumers who had not upgraded their iPads in years. He described the continuing design as "comfortably big enough" for typical content, with thoughtful touches, but a dated look because of the large bezels, and welcomed the ongoing inclusion of a headphone jack and rear-facing camera that sits flush with the tablet body. He noted that the lack of screen lamination and consequent flex of the screen during touches could be noticeable to users of higher-end tablets, that the lack of flash on either rear or front camera would hinder low-light teleconferencing and FaceTime Video use, and that the included amount of RAM was low compared to other tablets.

== Timeline ==
Timeline of iPad models
See also: List of Apple products

Source: Apple Newsroom Archive.

== Notes ==
Preceded by iPad (7th generation)	iPad (8th generation); 2020	Succeeded by iPad (9th generation)
