= Apple A10 =

System-on-a-chip designed by Apple Inc.

A10 Fusion
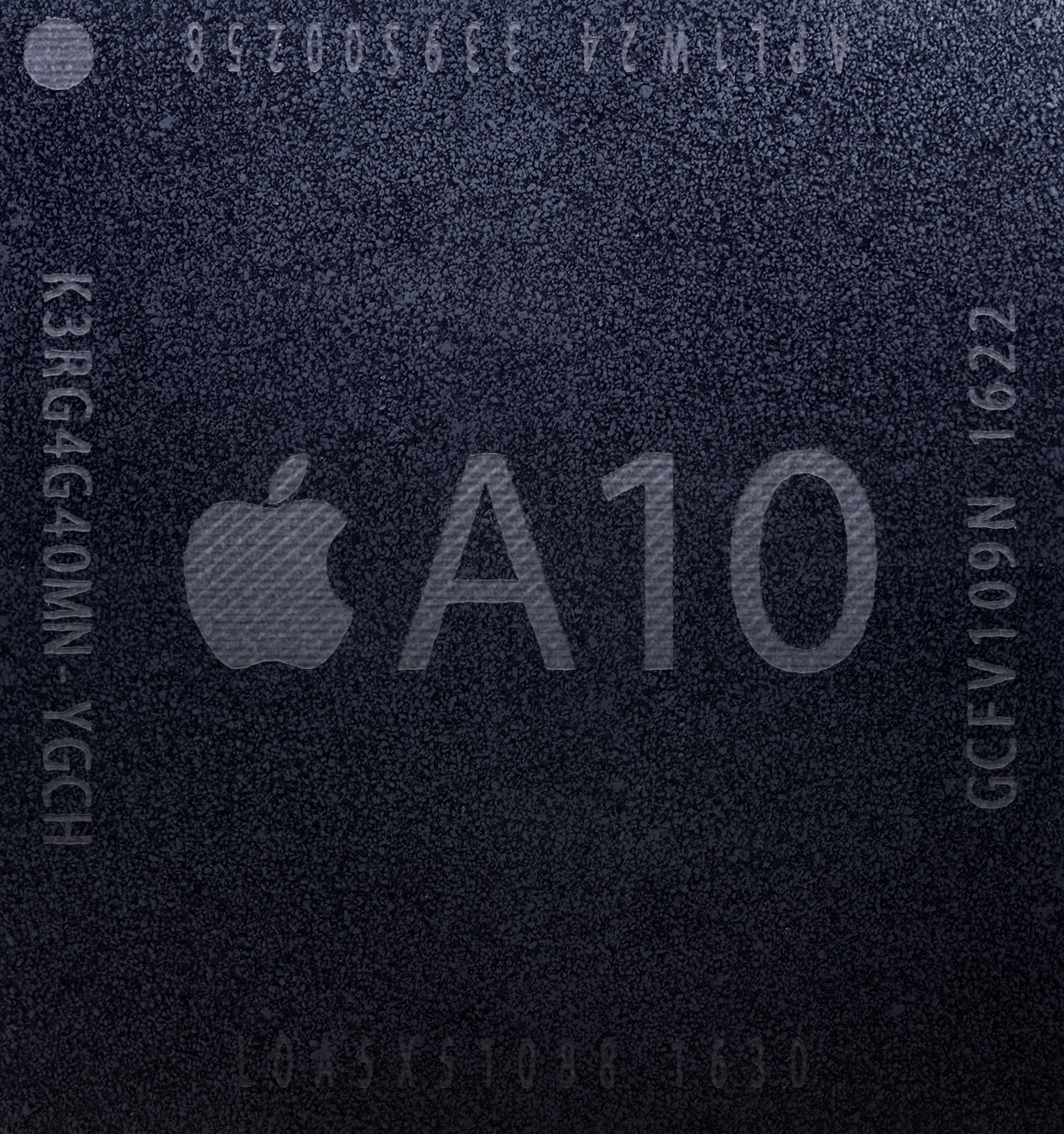

General information
- Launched: September 7, 2016
- Discontinued: May 10, 2022
- Designed by: Apple Inc.
- Common manufacturer: TSMC
- Product code: APL1W24
- Max. CPU clock rate: to 2.34 GHz

Physical specifications
- Transistors: 3.28 billion
- Cores: 4 (2× Hurricane + 2× Zephyr)
- GPUs: Custom PowerVR Series 7XT GT7600 Plus (hexa-core, internal name - Apple G9)

Cache
- L1 cache: Per core: 64 KB instruction + 64 KB data
- L2 cache: 3 MB shared
- L3 cache: 4 MB shared

Architecture and classification
- Application: Mobile
- Technology node: 16 nm (TSMC 16FFC)
- Microarchitecture: "Hurricane" and "Zephyr"
- Instruction set: ARMv8.1-A: A64, A32, T32

Products, models, variants
- Variant: Apple A10X Fusion Apple T2

History
- Predecessors: Apple A9 (iPhone); Apple A9X (iPad)
- Successor: Apple A11 Bionic

The Apple A10 Fusion is a 64-bit ARM-based system on a chip (SoC) designed by Apple Inc., part of the Apple silicon series, and manufactured by TSMC. It first appeared in the iPhone 7 and 7 Plus which were introduced on September 7, 2016, and is also used in the seventh generation iPod Touch and the sixth and seventh generation iPad. The A10 is the first Apple-designed silicon to feature a quad-core central processing unit (CPU), and also the first to support heterogeneous computing via using two types of CPU cores based on different microarchitectures. They are referred to as high-performance and the energy-efficiency cores, with a pair of each type of core. Apple states that it has 40% greater CPU performance and 50% greater graphics performance compared to its predecessor, the Apple A9. The Apple T2 chip is based on the A10. On May 10, 2022, the 7th generation iPod Touch was discontinued, ending production of A10 Fusion chips.

iOS 15, released in 2021, was the last major software update for the iPhone 7/7 Plus and the iPod Touch (7th generation). iPadOS 18, released in 2024, was the last major software update for the iPad (7th generation), while iPadOS 17, released in 2023, was the last major software update for the iPad (6th generation).

== Design ==
The A10 (internally the T8010) is built on TSMC's 16 nm FinFET process and contains 3.28 billion transistors on a die size of 125 mm^{2}, (entire chip, including the GPU and caches). It features an Apple-designed quad-core central processing unit (CPU) implementing the ARMv8-A instruction set architecture (ISA). The two high-performance cores are codenamed Hurricane, each taking up 4.18 mm^{2} of die space and is intended to handle performance-critical applications, such as a video game and video editing. It also features two energy-efficient 64-bit 1.05 GHz cores codenamed Zephyr, each taking up 0.78 mm^{2} of die space, designed for less demanding tasks. The two types of cores are arranged in a configuration similar to ARM's big.LITTLE design.

Unlike other contemporary big.LITTLE designs, such as the Exynos 8895 and Helio X20, that allows all CPU cores to be active simultaneously, on the A10 only one type of cores can be active at a time. Thus, the A10 Fusion appears to software and benchmarks as a dual core chip. Apple claims that the high-performance cores are 40% faster than Apple's previous A9 processor and that the two high-efficiency cores consume 20% of the power of the high performance Hurricane cores; they are used when performing simple tasks, such as checking email. A new performance controller decides in real-time which pair of cores should run for a given task in order to optimize for performance or battery life. The A10 has an L1 cache of 64 KB for data and 64 KB for instructions, an L2 cache of 3 MB shared by both cores, and a 4 MB L3 cache that services the entire SoC.

The A10 chip introduced many modern hardware based security enhancements:

- Kernel integrity protection, which helps to prevent modifications of kernel and driver code via a physical protected memory region allocated by the memory controller.
- Sealed Key Protection (SKP), where cryptographic keys are encrypted or "sealed" using hardware-backed identifiers and system software measurements
- OS-bound keys support for Public Key Accelerator (PKA), generated using a combination of the device’s UID and the hash of the sepOS running on the device, conditions data access based on mode of operation.

The new 6-core @ 900 MHz GPU built into the A10 chip is 50% faster while consuming 66% of the power of its A9 predecessor. Further analysis has suggested that Apple has kept the PowerVR GT7600 used in Apple A9, but replaced portions of the GPU with its own proprietary designs. These changes appear to be using lower half-precision floating-point numbers, allowing for higher-performance and lower power consumption.

Embedded in the A10 is the M10 motion coprocessor. The A10 also includes a new image processor which Apple says has twice the throughput of the prior image processor.

The A10 has video codec encoding support for HEVC and H.264. It has decoding support for HEVC, H.264, MPEG‑4 Part 2, and Motion JPEG.

The A10 is packaged in a new InFO packaging from TSMC which reduces the height of the package. In the same package there are also four LPDDR4 RAM chips integrating 2 GB of RAM in the iPhone 7, the iPad 6th generation, and the iPod touch 7th generation, or 3 GB in the iPhone 7 Plus and the iPad 7th generation.

== Products that include the Apple A10 Fusion ==
- iPhone 7 & 7 Plus
- iPad (6th generation)
- iPad (7th generation)
- iPod Touch (7th generation)

== Gallery ==
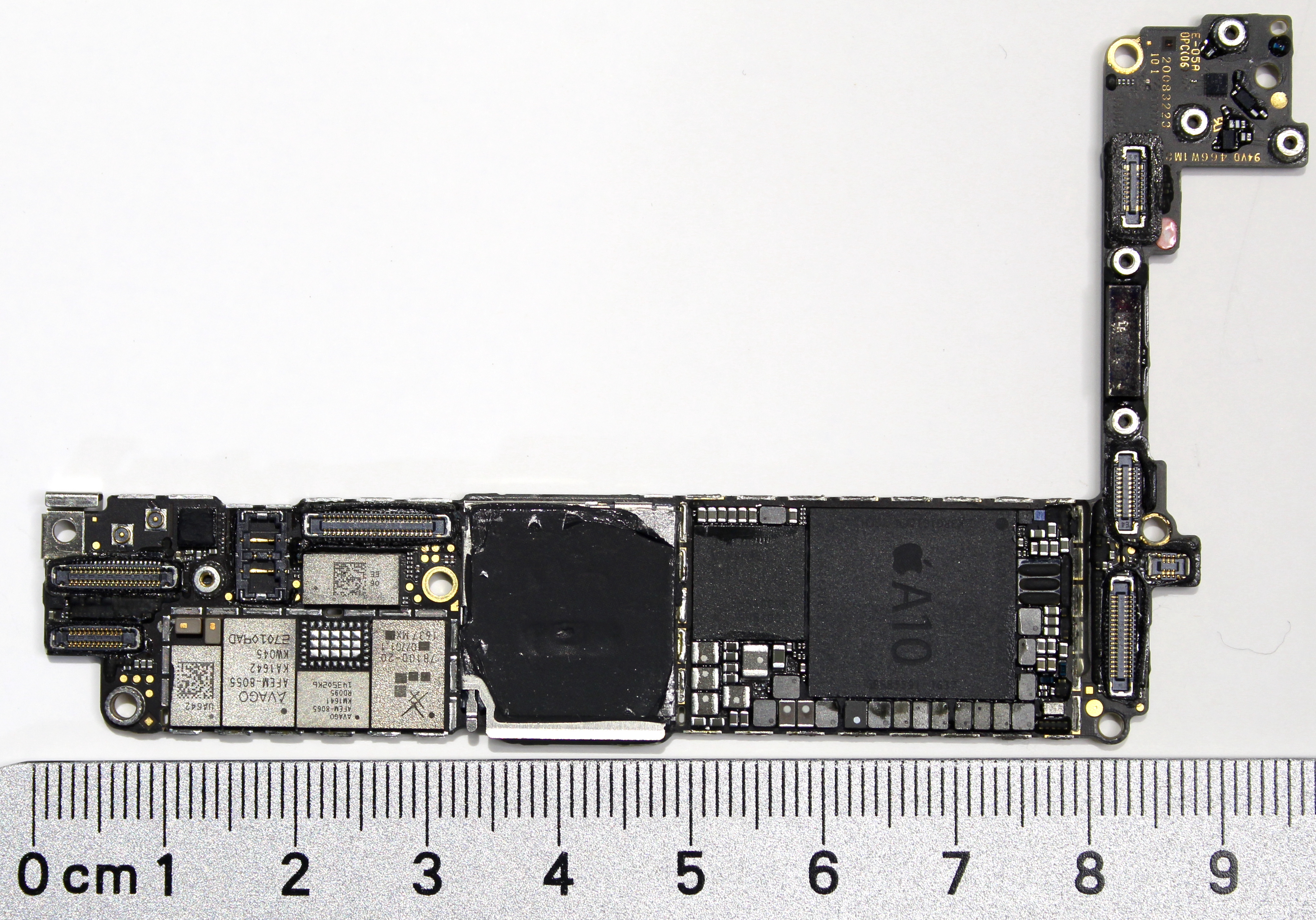
Apple A10 SoC on iPhone 7 motherboard

== See also ==
- Apple silicon, the range of ARM-based processors designed by Apple
- Apple A10X Fusion

Preceded by Apple A9	Apple A10 Fusion; 2016	Succeeded by Apple A11 Bionic
