= IPad (5th generation) =

Tablet computer developed by Apple (2017–2018)

iPad

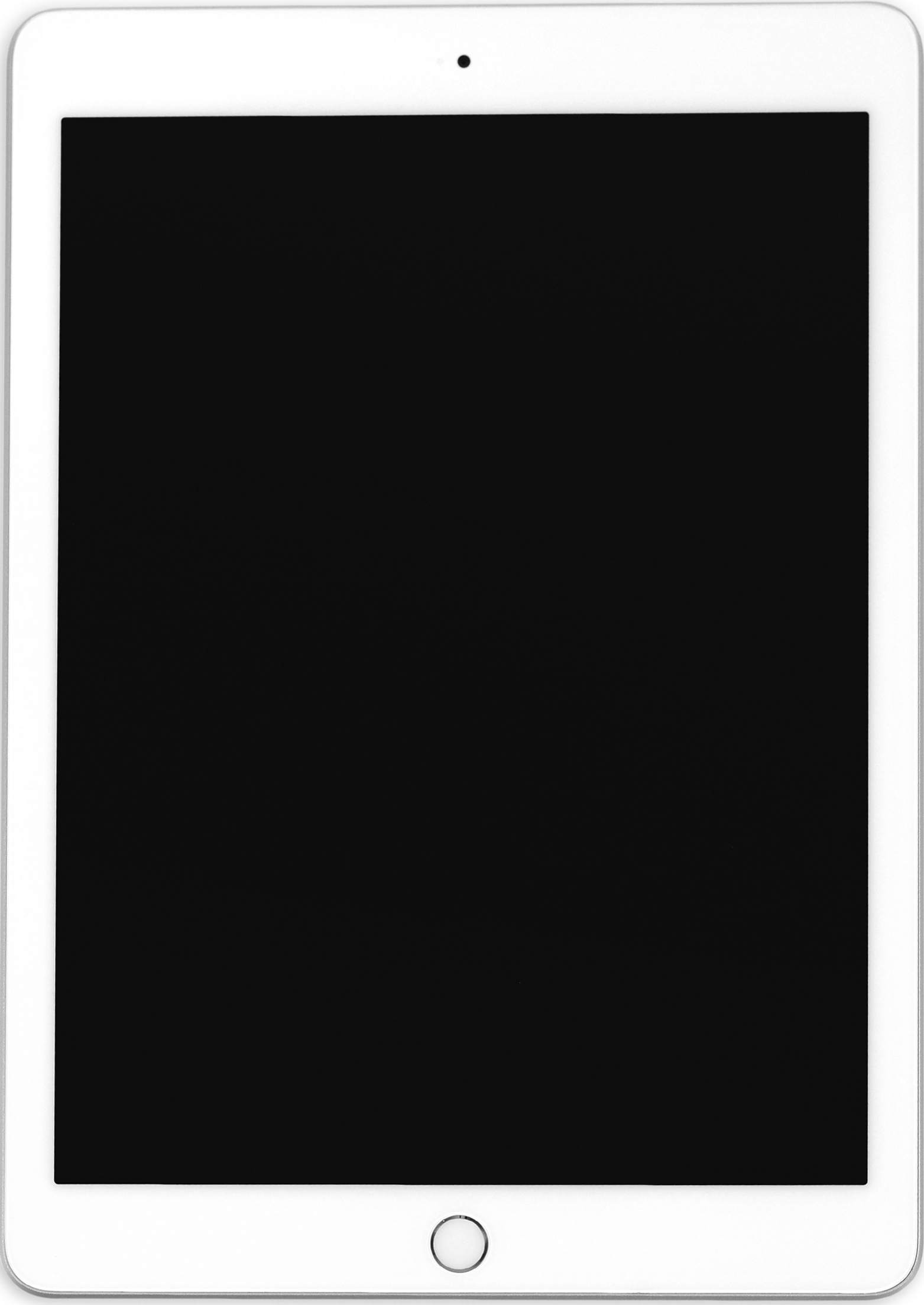
- iPad in Silver
- Also known as: iPad 9.7-inch (250 mm), iPad (2017), iPad 5
- Developer: Apple
- Product family: iPad
- Type: Tablet computer
- Released: March 24, 2017; 9 years ago
- Discontinued: March 27, 2018; 8 years ago
- Operating system: Original: iOS 10.3; Current: iPadOS 16.7.16, released May 11, 2026
- System on a chip: Apple A9 with 64-bit architecture and Apple M9 motion co-processor
- Memory: 2 GB LPDDR4 RAM
- Storage: 32 or 128 GB (Note: 1 GB = 1 billion bytes) flash memory
- Display: 9.7 inches (250 mm) 2,048 × 1,536 px (264 ppi) with a 4:3 aspect ratio
- Sound: Stereo
- Input: Multi-touch screen, headset controls, M9 motion co-processor, proximity and ambient light sensors, 3-axis accelerometer, 3-axis gyroscope, Touch ID fingerprint reader, barometer
- Camera: Front: 1.2 MP, 720p HD, ƒ/2.2 aperture Rear: 8.0 MP AF, iSight with Five Element Lens, Hybrid IR filter, video stabilization, face detection, HDR, ƒ/2.4 aperture
- Connectivity: Wi-Fi and Wi-Fi + Cellular: Wi-Fi 802.11 a/b/g/n/ac at 2.4 GHz and 5 GHz and MIMO Bluetooth 4.2 Wi-Fi + Cellular: GPS & GLONASS GSM UMTS / HSDPA 850, 1700, 1900, 2100 MHz GSM / EDGE 850, 900, 1800, 1900 MHz CDMA CDMA/EV-DO Rev. A and B. 800, 1900 MHz LTE Multiple bands A1567: 1, 2, 3, 4, 5, 7, 8, 12, 13, 17, 18, 19, 20, 25, 26, 28, 29 and TD-LTE 38, 39, 40, 41
- Power: Built-in rechargeable Li-Po battery 8,827 mAh 3.7 V 32.9 W⋅h (118 kJ)
- Online services: App Store, iTunes Store, Apple Books Store, iCloud, Game Center
- Dimensions: 240 × 169.5 × 7.5 mm (9.45 × 6.67 × 0.30 in)
- Weight: Wi-Fi: 469 g (1.034 lb); Wi-Fi + Cellular: 478 g (1.054 lb)
- Predecessor: iPad (4th generation)
- Successor: iPad (6th generation)
- Related: iPad Mini 4; iPad Air 2; iPad Pro
- Website: Apple - iPad at the Wayback Machine (archived July 1, 2017)

The fifth-generation iPad (also referred to as the iPad 9.7-inch) is a tablet computer developed and marketed by Apple. After its announcement on March 21, 2017, conflicting naming conventions spawned a number of different names, including "fifth-generation iPad" or "iPad (2017)".

The device was released five years after the previous fourth-generation iPad, as the iPad Air was released in 2013 as the successor to the iPad lineup. The iPad Air lineup later continued as a separate, higher-end device, while the iPad was positioned as an entry-level model.

Unlike the iPad Air 2, this iPad does not have a fully laminated display, and also lacks an anti-reflective coating.

On March 27, 2018, Apple announced its successor, the sixth-generation iPad.

== History ==
This iPad model was announced by Apple on March 24, 2017, in a press release. There has been confusion around its naming, being referred to as just "iPad" in marketing, but called the "fifth-generation iPad" in official statements and specifications sheets, a title previously taken by 2013's iPad Air. Other sources refer to it as the "seventh-generation iPad", when including the iPad Air and iPad Air 2 as the fifth- and sixth-generation iPads respectively. It has also been referred to as "iPad 2017".

=== Pricing strategies ===
Matt Kapko of CIO wrote that Apple's introductory pricing of $329 in the United States for the iPad, a $70 price reduction vs the iPad Air 2, appeared to be designed to fend off the encroachment of Google's Chromebook laptops in the education sector and to foster wider adoption in customer-facing terminals. Kapko also wrote that the device is designed to appeal to businesses that require inexpensive tablets for undemanding use, including as kiosks, checkout terminals, and hospitality screens.

== Specifications ==
=== Hardware ===
The fifth generation iPad shares most design elements with the iPad Air, with a 9.7-inch (250 mm) screen, 7.5 mm (0.30 in) thickness, and differences such as the lack of the physical mute switch, smaller microphone holes and only a single row of speaker holes, and storage. Compared to the iPad Air 2, the processor is updated from the Apple A8X to the A9 with the embedded Apple M9 motion co-processor. The fifth generation iPad has 2 gigabytes of RAM. Unlike other iPad models available, this iPad's display is not fully laminated and does not have anti-reflective coating. However, this iPad has a brighter screen than the iPad Air 2 (25% brighter according to Apple). It is available in 32 and 128 GB storage options. Contrasting with the iPad Pro lineup, this iPad features only two speakers (as opposed to four), has no Smart Connector support, and has no camera flash. It is offered in silver, gold, and space grey colors. Despite its use of the Apple A9 processor and accompanying M9 motion co-processor, introduced with the iPhone 6S in 2015, the iPad does not feature support for always-on "Hey Siri" voice input, a feature advertised as being made possible by low-power processing in the then-new chips. The use of "Hey Siri" is limited to when the iPad is connected to power.

=== Software ===
At the time of its original release, the iPad shipped with iOS 10, a version of Apple's mobile operating system. New units sold come with the new iOS 11 operating system after its Fall 2017 release. The included Touch ID fingerprint sensor allows the user to unlock the device as well as approve purchases from the App Store, iTunes Store, and Apple Books Store. Touch ID and Apple Pay let the user purchase items from websites or from within apps.

The fifth-generation iPad supports up to iPadOS 16, and does not support iPadOS 17.

== Reception ==
The iPad received generally positive reviews. It was significantly praised for performance, with reviewers asserting that the model was noticeably faster than older iPad models, and also received positive reviews for its price and battery life. It was criticized, however, for lacking a laminated and anti-reflective screen, lack of support for the Apple Pencil, and lack of a Smart Connector for accessories such as attachable keyboards, the latter two of these criticisms being remedied with the introduction of the iPad (6th generation) a year later. Its introductory price in the United States was the lowest ever for an iPad, with the media noting that the lower price might be an effort to encourage wider adoption of the tablet in the education sector, as well as for businesses needing inexpensive tablets for undemanding uses.

Dieter Bohn of The Verge wrote that "it is a thin, fast tablet", and praised the screen for being "very good", despite not having "the fancy True Tone display that the iPad Pro does, nor does it have some of the things that made the screen on the iPad Air 2 so nice: lamination and anti-reflectivity". He criticized the lack of support for attachable keyboards and Apple Pencil, while praising the A9 processor as "significantly faster than older iPads", though noting that it isn't "necessarily significantly faster than the iPad Air 2", and "not as fast as the iPad Pro". He also disliked that the iPad only features two speakers, as opposed to four on the iPad Pro, while summarizing the overall review with "Fundamentally, what I am trying to tell you is that this is an iPad. You trust that iPads are decent tablets and that they have a basic level of quality, speed, and functionality" and "Get one if you need one, but don't stress that you're missing out if you don't."

Sascha Segan of PC Magazine wrote that "The Apple iPad is more affordable than ever" and noted that "While there's little reason for existing iPad owners to upgrade, the new iPad's price stabs a stake into the heart of many competing Android tablets". Although criticizing the non-laminated display for being "a little more washed out than its predecessor", he claimed that he "couldn't see a measurable difference" and that it's "a nominal degradation in quality that doesn't really matter in everyday use". Segan also praised performance compared to the prior iPad models, and also praised improved Wi-Fi performance, writing that it is "quite impressive" with "double the Wi-Fi speeds on the new iPad than I did on the Air 2". Jeff Benjamin of 9to5Mac wrote that "Sure, it lacks the gorgeous laminated, anti-reflective display of the iPad Air 2, and sure it's not as svelte in either thickness or weight. But there's no denying that the 2017 iPad with A9 dual core processor in tow, is a good value". He described the tablet as a "solid buy for upgraders and new users".

Igor Bonifacic of MobileSyrup also praised the performance, as well as number of iPad apps available, but criticized the camera for being outdated and keyboard/Pencil incompatibility, with a summarization reading: "The 2017 iPad is not an exciting tablet. But then it's not supposed to be exciting, [...] Apple's latest tablet is an iterative update designed to appeal to a specific subset of consumers". Bonifacic also called the tablet "perfect for first-time tablet buyers". Chris Velazco of Engadget praised battery life, describing it as "one of the best iPads we've tested", but also criticized the lack of anti-reflection on the display, calling it "another cost-saving measure that I wish Apple had reconsidered".

== Timeline ==
Timeline of iPad models
See also: List of Apple products

Source: Apple Newsroom Archive.

== Notes ==
Preceded by iPad (4th generation)	iPad (5th generation); 2017	Succeeded by iPad (6th generation)
