= IPad (7th generation) =

Tablet computer developed by Apple (2019–2020)

iPad

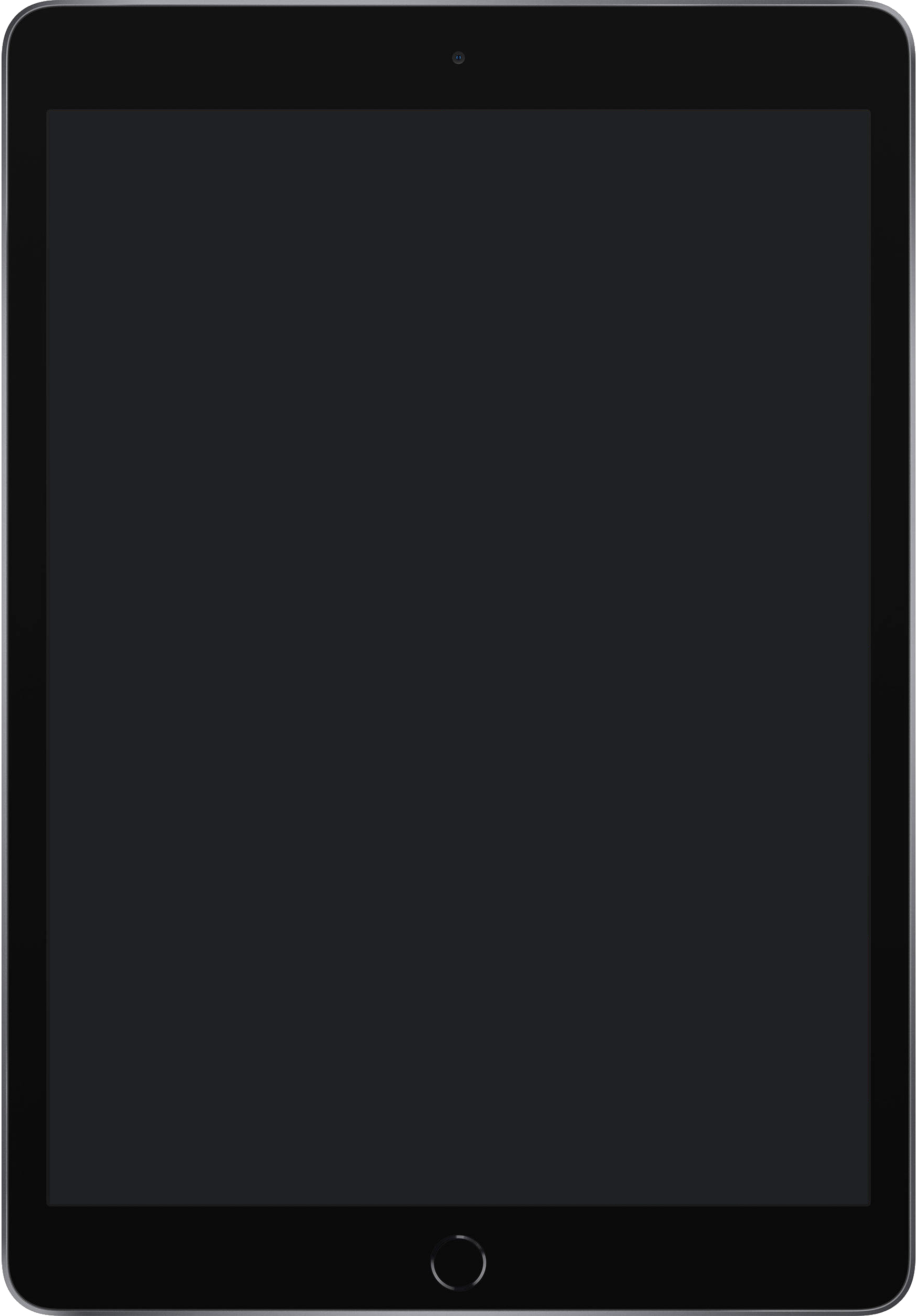
- 10.2 in (260 mm) iPad
- Developer: Apple
- Manufacturer: Foxconn
- Product family: iPad
- Type: Tablet computer
- Released: September 25, 2019
- Introductory price: US$329
- Discontinued: September 15, 2020
- Operating system: Original: iPadOS 13.1; Current: iPadOS 18.7.12, released November 9, 2026
- System on a chip: Apple A10 Fusion and Apple M10 motion co-processor
- Memory: 3 GB LPDDR4 SDRAM
- Storage: 32 or 128 GB (Note: 1 GB = 1 billion bytes)
- Display: 10.2 inches (260 mm) 2,160 × 1,620 px (264 ppi) with a 4:3 aspect ratio
- Sound: Stereo
- Input: Multi-touch screen, headset controls, M10 motion co-processor, proximity and ambient light sensors, 3-axis accelerometer, 3-axis gyroscope, Touch ID fingerprint reader, barometer
- Camera: Front: 1.2 MP, 720p HD, ƒ/2.2 aperture Rear: 8.0 MP AF, iSight with Five Element Lens, Hybrid IR filter, video stabilization, face detection, HDR, ƒ/2.4 aperture
- Power: 32.4 W·h, up to 8 hours of battery life
- Dimensions: 250.6 × 174.1 × 7.5 mm (9.87 × 6.85 × 0.30 in)
- Weight: Wi-Fi: 483 g (1.065 lb); Wi-Fi + Cellular: 493 g (1.087 lb)
- Predecessor: iPad (6th generation)
- Successor: iPad (8th generation)
- Website: web.archive.org/web/20200914073746/https://www.apple.com/ipad-10.2/

The seventh-generation iPad (also referred to as the iPad 10.2-inch) is a tablet computer developed and marketed by Apple. It has a 10.2-inch (260 mm) Retina display and is powered by the Apple A10 Fusion processor. The successor to the 9.7-inch (250 mm) sixth-generation iPad, it was revealed on September 10, 2019, and released on September 25, 2019.

Aimed at the budget and educational markets, it was the first entry-level iPad with a 10.2-inch (260 mm) display instead of a 9.7-inch (250 mm) display. The device supports the first-generation Apple Pencil, like its predecessor, and Apple's Smart Keyboard cover. It is the last supported iPad that lacks a Neural Engine; it can run versions of iPadOS up to iPadOS 18.

Its successor, the eighth-generation iPad, was revealed on September 15, 2020.

== History ==
Rumors of a successor to the 2018 iPad surfaced in January 2019, after Apple registered seven iPad models with the Eurasian Economic Commission, whose database is known for providing hints about the company's upcoming devices. One of the models was rumored to be a new entry-level iPad with minor design upgrades from the 2018 model, including a dual-lens rear camera and a 10.2-inch (260 mm) display. BGR said mass production could start in July 2019 for release in the year's third quarter.

Apple revealed the 7th-gen iPad—along with the iPhone 11, iPhone 11 Pro and iPhone 11 Pro Max—at its Steve Jobs Theater on September 10, 2019, with a starting price of $329 (in the United States) and a release date of September 30. It actually went on sale on Apple's website on September 25, 2019.

It was larger than its 6th-gen predecessor, with a body that matched the third-generation iPad Air and the previous-generation 10.5 in (270 mm) iPad Pro. This allowed the Smart Keyboard to be used for all three models, which eliminated the need for recharging and pairing of third-party Bluetooth keyboards and satisfied the education market's requirement for direct-connection keyboards during standardized tests.

As announced at Apple's WWDC 2025, the seventh-generation iPad supports no version of iPadOS after iPadOS 18.

== Reception ==
Some criticized the 2019 10.2 in (260 mm) iPad for containing the same A10 processor as the previous year's 9.7 in (250 mm) model, but the system-on-chip housing the A10 chip includes 3 GB of RAM, one more than the previous year's model. Battery life has also been praised for the A10 series.

== Timeline of models ==
Timeline of iPad models
See also: List of Apple products

Source: Apple Newsroom Archive.

== Notes ==
Preceded by iPad (6th generation)	iPad (7th generation); 2019	Succeeded by iPad (8th generation)
