= IPad (6th generation) =

Tablet computer developed by Apple (2018–2019)

iPad

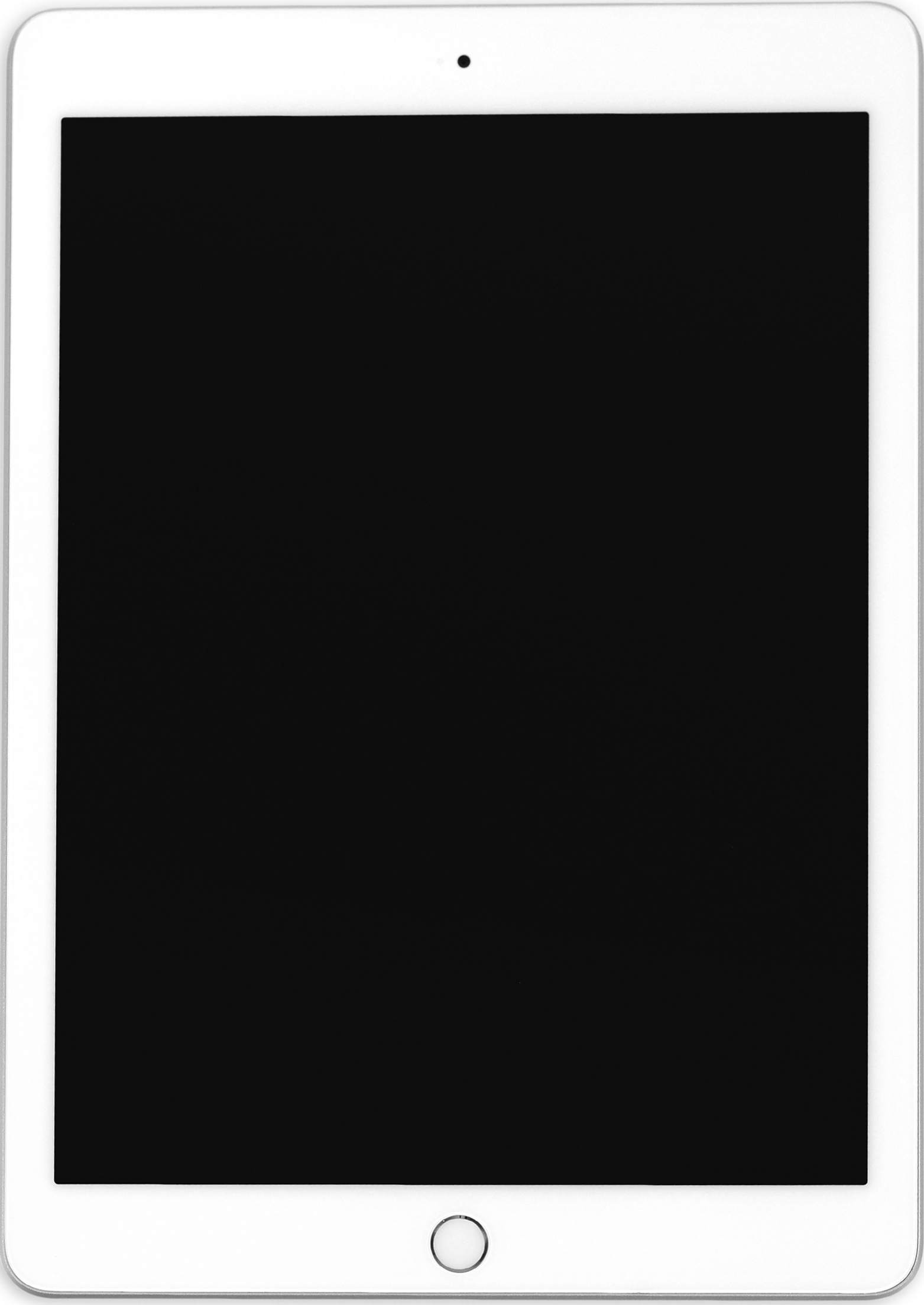
- iPad (6th generation) in Silver
- Also known as: iPad 9.7 in (250 mm), iPad (2018), iPad 6
- Developer: Apple
- Product family: iPad
- Type: Tablet computer
- Generation: 6th
- Released: March 30, 2018
- Introductory price: US$329
- Discontinued: September 10, 2019; 7 years ago
- Operating system: Original: iOS 11.3; Current: iPadOS 17.7.11, released May 11, 2026 iPadOS 18 (unofficial)
- System on a chip: Apple A10 Fusion with 64-bit architecture and Apple M10
- CPU: 2.34 GHz quad-core 64-bit
- Memory: 2 GB LPDDR4 RAM
- Storage: 32 or 128 GB (Note: 1 GB = 1 billion bytes)
- Display: 9.7 inches (250 mm) 2,048 × 1,536 px (264 ppi) with a 4:3 aspect ratio
- Sound: Stereo
- Input: Multi-touch screen, M10 motion co-processor, proximity and ambient light sensors, 3-axis accelerometer, 3-axis gyroscope, Touch ID fingerprint reader, barometer
- Camera: Front: 1.2 MP, 720p HD, ƒ/2.2 aperture Rear: 8.0 MP AF, iSight with Five Element Lens, Hybrid IR filter, video stabilization, face detection, HDR, ƒ/2.4 aperture
- Connectivity: Wi-Fi and Wi-Fi + Cellular: Wi-Fi 802.11 a/b/g/n/ac at 2.4 GHz and 5 GHz and MIMO Bluetooth 4.2, Broadcom BCM4359 Chip (Same as iPhone 7) Wi-Fi + Cellular: GPS & GLONASS GSM UMTS / HSDPA 850, 1700, 1900, 2100 MHz GSM / EDGE 850, 900, 1800, 1900 MHz CDMA CDMA/EV-DO Rev. A and B. 800, 1900 MHz LTE Multiple bands A1567: 1, 2, 3, 4, 5, 7, 8, 12, 13, 17, 18, 19, 20, 25, 26, 28, 29 and TD-LTE 38, 39, 40, 41
- Power: Built-in 32.4-watt-hour rechargeable Li-Po battery
- Online services: App Store, iTunes Store, iBooks Store, iCloud, Game Center
- Dimensions: 240 mm (9.4 in) (h); 169.5 mm (6.67 in) (w); 7.5 mm (0.30 in) (d)
- Weight: Wi-Fi: 469 g (1.034 lb); Wi-Fi + Cellular: 478 g (1.054 lb)
- Predecessor: iPad (5th generation)
- Successor: iPad (7th generation)
- Related: iPad Pro
- Website: iPad - Apple at the Wayback Machine (archived August 5, 2019)

The sixth-generation iPad (also referred to as the iPad 9.7-inch) is a tablet computer developed and marketed by Apple. It was announced and released in March 2018 and succeeded the fifth-generation iPad, upgraded with the Apple A10 Fusion processor and support for styluses including the Apple Pencil. The iPad was marketed towards educators and schools.

The sixth generation was replaced in September 2019, by the seventh-generation iPad and is the last iPad with the original 9.7 in (250 mm) display size.

== Specifications ==
The iPad was shipped with iOS 11.3, and had the iWork suite of apps pre-installed and included Apple Pencil stylus support. The iPad supports up to iPadOS 17, and does not support iPadOS 18 or iPadOS 26. In June 2025, a developer on GitHub unofficially ported iPadOS 18 to the iPad.

The iPad's hardware is nearly identical to the previous generation, except for a few upgrades, such as Apple Pencil and stylus support and an upgraded processor, the Apple A10 Fusion. It is available in three colors: Silver, Space Gray, and Gold, a new color, matching the updated color introduced with the iPhone 8. The iPad has 2 gigabytes of RAM. It is 7.5 mm thick. The iPad is available in 32 and 128 GB storage options. Unlike other iPad models, this iPad does not feature a laminated display.

== Release and reception ==
The sixth generation iPad was announced on March 27, 2018, during an education-focused event at Lane Tech High School in Chicago. The iPad was upgraded over the fifth-generation iPad with the Apple A10 Fusion processor and support for the Apple Pencil and other styluses, and was marketed towards educators and schools. It went on sale March 27, 2018 for US$329.

The 2018 iPad received positive reviews. Gareth Beavis of TechRadar praised the addition of the Apple Pencil and the powerful A10 chip, but noted that it was as costly as the previous generation iPad. Scott Stein of CNET also praised the addition of support for Apple Pencil and the upgrade to the A10 chip, but criticized it for lacking the Smart Connector as well as not having the same display technology as the iPad Pro, writing "the 2018 entry-level iPad doesn't add much, but it makes an already excellent tablet a better buy than ever."

== Timeline of models ==
Timeline of iPad models
See also: List of Apple products

Source: Apple Newsroom Archive.

== Notes ==
Preceded by iPad (5th generation)	iPad (6th generation); 2018	Succeeded by iPad (7th generation)
