= IPad (9th generation) =

2021 tablet computer developed by Apple

iPad (9th generation)

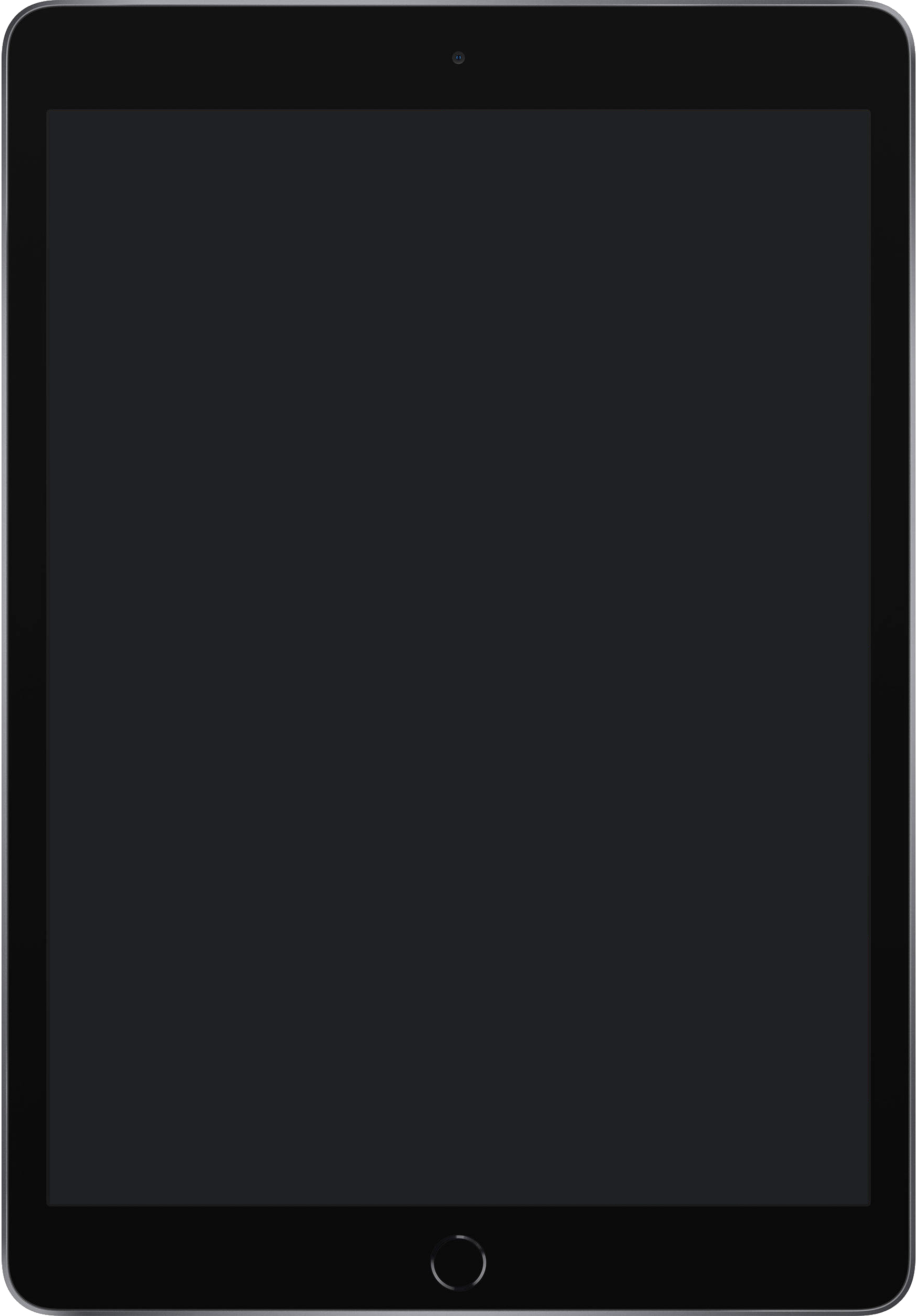
- iPad (9th generation) in Space Gray
- Also known as: iPad (9th generation), iPad 10.2-inch, iPad (10.2-inch) (3rd generation), iPad 9, iPad (2021)
- Developer: Apple
- Product family: iPad
- Type: Tablet computer
- Generation: 9th
- Released: September 24, 2021; 5 years ago
- Introductory price: US$329
- Discontinued: May 7, 2024; 2 years ago
- Operating system: Original: iPadOS 15; Current: iPadOS 27.2, released October 26, 2026
- System on a chip: Apple A13 Bionic with 64-bit architecture and embedded motion co-processor
- CPU: Hexa-core (2× Lightning and 4× Thunder)
- Memory: 3 GB LPDDR4X SDRAM
- Storage: 64 or 256 GB (Note: 1 GB = 1 billion bytes)
- Display: 10.2 inches (260 mm) 2160 × 1620 px (264 ppi) with a 4:3 aspect ratio, 500 nits max brightness (typical)
- Graphics: Apple-designed quad-core
- Sound: Stereo speakers
- Input: Multi-touch screen, headset controls, proximity and ambient light sensors, 3-axis accelerometer, 3-axis gyroscope, digital compass, dual microphone, Touch ID fingerprint reader, barometer
- Camera: Front: 12 MP, 1080p HD, ƒ/2.4 aperture Rear: 8.0 MP AF, iSight with Five Element Lens, Hybrid IR filter, video stabilization, face detection, HDR, ƒ/2.4 aperture
- Connectivity: All models: Wi-Fi 5 (802.11ac) with 2x2 MIMO; speeds up to 866 Mbit/s; Bluetooth 4.2; Wi-Fi + cellular models: UMTS/HSPA/HSPA+/DC-HSDPA (850, 900, 1700/2100, 1900, 2100 MHz); Gigabit-class LTE (Bands 1, 2, 3, 4, 5, 7, 8, 11, 12, 13, 14, 17, 18, 19, 20, 21, 25, 26, 29, 30, 34, 38, 39, 40, 41, 66, 71); Data only; Wi-Fi calling; eSIM
- Power: 32.4 W·h, up to 10 hours of battery life
- Online services: App Store, iTunes Store, iBookstore, iCloud, Game Center
- Dimensions: 250.6 mm (9.87 in) H 174.1 mm (6.85 in) W 7.5 mm (0.30 in) D
- Weight: Wi-Fi: 487 g (1.074 lb); Wi-Fi + Cellular: 498 g (1.098 lb)
- Predecessor: iPad (8th generation)
- Successor: iPad (10th generation)
- Website: web.archive.org/web/20211221055313/https://www.apple.com/ipad-10.2 at the Wayback Machine (archived December 21, 2021)

The ninth-generation iPad (also referred to as the iPad 10.2-inch) is a tablet computer developed and marketed by Apple as the successor to the eighth-generation iPad. It was announced on September 14, 2021, and released on September 24. The ninth-generation iPad was discontinued on May 7, 2024, with the announcement of the iPad Air (6th generation) and the iPad Pro (7th generation). It is the last iPad model to feature a home button, a Lightning port, and a standard 3.5 mm stereo headphone jack. The iPad (9th generation) was replaced with the 10th generation in October 2022 after the release of the iPhone 14.

== Features ==
The ninth-generation iPad has the same design as the seventh- and eighth-generation iPads, although all color options now come with a black display bezel, and the gold color option has been removed. It is compatible with the first-generation Apple Pencil, and the Smart Keyboard and Smart Connector for keyboard attachments. It uses the Apple A13 Bionic chip previously seen in the iPhone 11 in 2019, which Apple claims gives a 20% CPU, GPU, and Neural Engine increase in performance compared to its predecessor.

It features a 10.2 in (260 mm) Retina display identical to the previous models, with 1620 by 2160 pixels at a density of 264 PPI, and includes True Tone technology, meaning the display can adjust its color temperature based on the surrounding light temperature; marking the debut for the feature on an entry-level iPad. It is also the first entry-level iPad to support Apple Center Stage.

A new 12 MP front camera (122 degree wide-angle) is fitted in place of the 1.2 MP camera of previous models, which features Center Stage technology that detects the user and moves the camera view accordingly during video recording and calls. The rear 8 MP camera is from the earlier iPad Air 2. The base storage is doubled to 64 GB. iPadOS 15 is pre-installed at release.

The iPad (9th generation) is the last iPad to feature a home button, a standard 3.5 mm stereo headphone jack, and a Lightning port, as the iPad (10th generation) and later removed the home button, do not feature a headphone jack, and use a USB-C port.

== Reception ==
The New York Times called the 9th-generation iPad "the best tablet for almost anyone" in 2022, praising its price, performance and features. CNET gave it an 8.1/10, and praised the iPad for its performance and increased storage over its predecessor, while finding fault with its design, which was perceived as outdated. PC Mag praised the iPad for its performance, storage, and display, stating "For the price, it’s hard to expect too much more", though the speakers were criticized for their audio quality.

== Timeline ==
Timeline of iPad models
See also: List of Apple products

Source: Apple Newsroom Archive.

== Notes ==
Preceded by iPad (8th generation)	iPad (9th generation); 2021	Succeeded by iPad (10th generation)
