= IPad Air =

Line of tablet computers by Apple

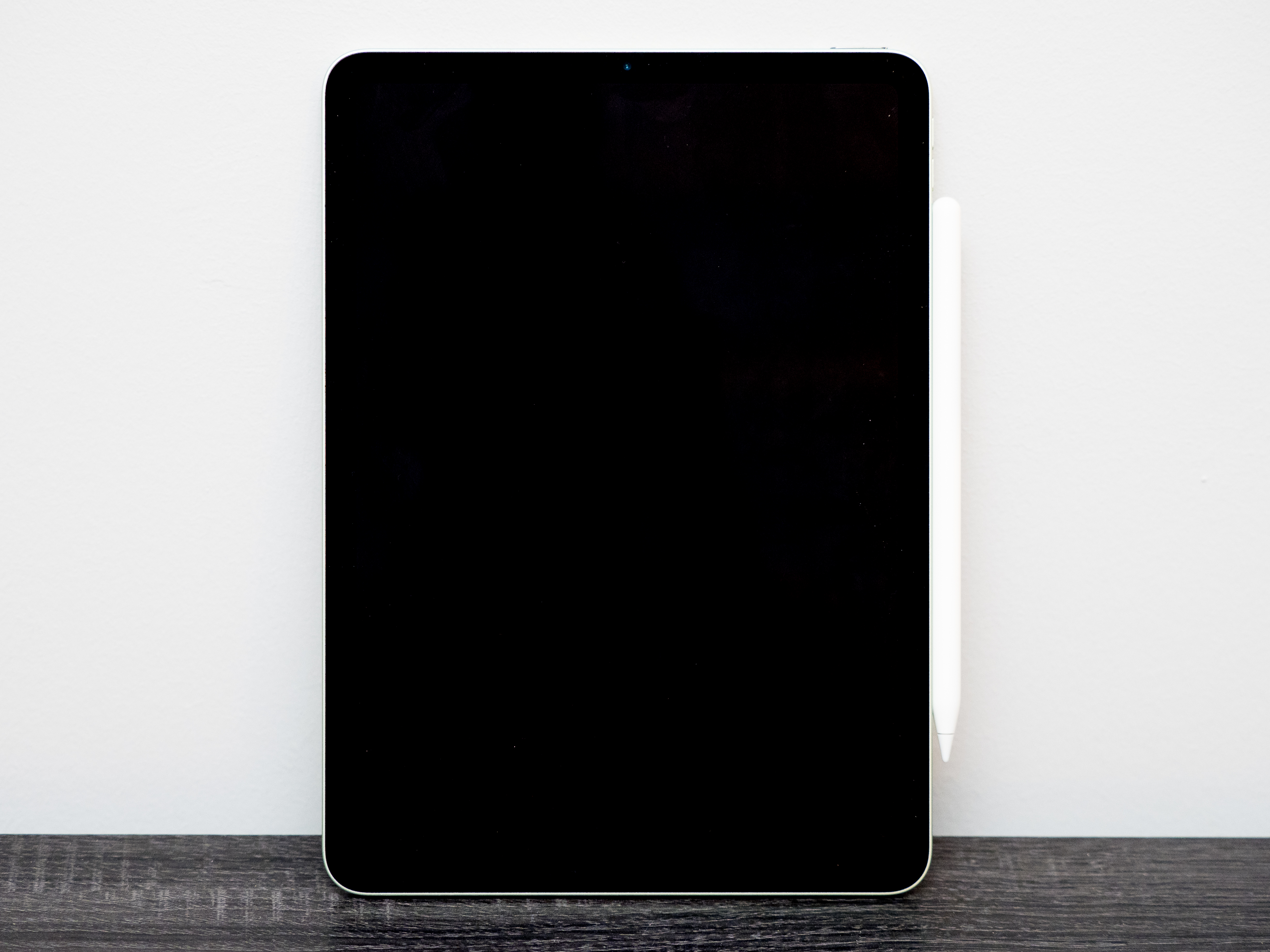
An iPad Air (4th generation) with an Apple Pencil (2nd generation) attached

The iPad Air is a series of tablet computers by Apple, part of the iPad lineup. It may refer to:

- iPad Air (1st generation), released in 2013
- iPad Air 2, released in 2014
- iPad Air (3rd generation), released in 2019
- iPad Air (4th generation), released in 2020
- iPad Air (5th generation), released in 2022
- iPad Air (M2), released in 2024
- iPad Air (M3), released in 2025
- iPad Air (M4), released in 2026
