= List of iPad models =

The iPad is a brand of tablet computers designed and marketed by Apple. Introduced in 2010, Apple has released a variety of iPad models since its launch, including the smaller iPad Mini, the lighter and thinner iPad Air, and the higher-end iPad Pro.

This article is intended to provide an overview of the various iPad models that are or have been marketed by Apple.

== Comparison of models ==
Legend	Discontinued and unsupported	Discontinued but supported	Current	Upcoming

=== iPad ===
Model	Announced	Release(d)		Discontinued	Support		
Model	Announced	With OS	Date	Discontinued	Latest OS	Ended	Lifespan (Note: The duration of software support, from the initial release date to the date of the final software update for the device.)
iPad (1st)	January 27, 2010	iPhone OS 3.2	April 3, 2010	March 2, 2011	iOS 5.1.1	May 7, 2012	2 years, 1 month
iPad 2	March 2, 2011	iOS 4.3	March 11, 2011	March 18, 2014	iOS 9.3.5 iOS 9.3.6	August 25, 2016 (Wi-Fi); July 22, 2019 (Wi-Fi + Cellular)	5 years, 5 months (Wi-Fi); 8 years, 4 months (Wi-Fi + Cellular)
iPad (3rd)	March 7, 2012	iOS 5.1	March 16, 2012	October 23, 2012	iOS 9.3.5 iOS 9.3.6	August 25, 2016 (Wi-Fi); July 22, 2019 (Wi-Fi + Cellular)	4 years, 5 months (Wi-Fi); 7 years, 4 months (Wi-Fi + Cellular)
iPad (4th)	October 23, 2012	iOS 6.0	November 2, 2012	October 16, 2014	iOS 10.3.3 iOS 10.3.4	July 19, 2017 (Wi-Fi); July 22, 2019 (Wi-Fi + Cellular)	4 years, 8 months (Wi-Fi); 6 years, 8 months (Wi-Fi + Cellular)
iPad (5th)	March 21, 2017	iOS 10.3	March 24, 2017	March 27, 2018	iPadOS 16.7.16	May 11, 2026	9 years, 1 month
iPad (6th)	March 27, 2018	iOS 11.3	March 27, 2018	September 10, 2019	iPadOS 17.7.11	May 11, 2026	8 years, 1 month
iPad (7th)	September 10, 2019	iPadOS 13.1	September 25, 2019	September 15, 2020	iPadOS 18.7.12	November 9, 2026	7 years, 1 month
iPad (8th)	September 15, 2020	iPadOS 14.0	September 18, 2020	September 14, 2021	iPadOS 26.7.3	November 9, 2026	6 years, 2 months
iPad (9th)	September 14, 2021	iPadOS 15.0	September 24, 2021	May 7, 2024	Latest iPadOS iPadOS 27.2.1	Supported; November 9, 2026	5 years, 1 month
iPad (10th)	October 18, 2022	iPadOS 16.0	October 26, 2022	March 4, 2025	Latest iPadOS iPadOS 27.2.1	Supported; November 9, 2026	4 years
iPad (A16)	March 4, 2025	iPadOS 18.3	March 12, 2025	Current	Latest iPadOS iPadOS 27.2.1	Supported; November 9, 2026	1 year, 8 months

==== Supported ====
Model		iPad (A16)	iPad (10th generation)	iPad (9th generation)
Picture				
Initial release operating system		iPadOS 18.3	iPadOS 16.0	iPadOS 15.0
Latest release operating system		iPadOS 27.2.1		
Display	Screen size	10.9 in (280 mm)		10.2 in (260 mm)
Display	Backlight	LED-backlit		
Display	Multi-touch	Yes		
Display	Technology	Liquid Retina display with IPS technology		Retina display with IPS technology
Display	Resolution	2360 × 1640		2160 × 1620
Display	Pixel density (ppi)	264		
Display	Aspect ratio	~10:7		4:3
Display	Typ. max. brightness ( cd/m^{2})	500		
Display	HDR max. brightness ( cd/m^{2})	—N/a		
Display	Fingerprint-resistant oleophobic coating	Yes		
Display	Laminated display	No		
Display	Anti-reflective coating	No		
Display	Reflectance	—N/a		
Display	Full sRGB display	Yes		
Display	Wide color display (Display P3)	No		
Display	True Tone display	Yes		
Display	Night Shift	Yes		
Display	ProMotion display	No		
Display	HDR10 content	Yes		
Display	Dolby Vision	Yes		
Processor	Chip	Apple A16	Apple A14 Bionic	Apple A13 Bionic
Processor	Fabrication node	4 nm	5 nm	7 nm
Processor	Total cores	5	6	
Processor	High-performance cores	2 × Everest	2 × Firestorm	2 × Lightning
Processor	Energy-Efficiency Cores	3 × Sawtooth	4 × Icestorm	4 × Thunder
Processor	Clock speed	3.44 GHz	3.09 GHz	2.66 GHz
Processor	Bit	64-bit		
Processor	Motion coprocessor	Embedded in SoC		
Processor	Bus width	64-bit		
Processor	Graphics processor	Apple designed 4-core GPU (G15P)	Apple designed 4-core GPU (G13P)	Apple designed 4-core GPU (G12P)
Processor	Neural Engine	16-core Neural Engine (17 TOPS)	16-core Neural Engine (11 TOPS)	8-core Neural Engine (5.5 TOPS)
Storage		128 GB, 256 GB, 512 GB	64 GB, 256 GB	
Storage type		NAND Flash driven by NVMe-based controller that communicates over a PCIe connection		
RAM		6 GB	4 GB	3 GB
RAM type		LPDDR5	LPDDR4X	
Virtual memory swap		No		
Connector		USB-C port with USB 2.0		8-pin Lightning connector with USB 2.0
Connector		Smart Connector (side, for Smart Keyboard)		
External display support		One display up to 4K resolution at 60 Hz	One display up to 4K resolution at 30 Hz or 1080p resolution at 60 Hz	No
Connectivity	Wi-Fi (802.11)	Wi-Fi 6 (802.11a/b/g/n/ac/ax)		Wi-Fi 5 (802.11a/b/g/n/ac)
Connectivity	Maximum speed	1.2 Gbit/s		866 Mbit/s
Connectivity	MIMO	Yes		
Connectivity	Simultaneous dual band	Yes		No
Connectivity	Bluetooth	Bluetooth 5.3	Bluetooth 5.2	Bluetooth 4.2
Connectivity	Cellular	5G (sub-6 GHz)/Gigabit LTE/UMTS/HSPA/HSPA+/DC-HSDPA (only in devices with cellular option)		Gigabit-class LTE/UMTS/HSPA/HSPA+/DC‑HSDPA/GSM/EDGE (only in devices with cellular option)
Connectivity	VoLTE	No		
Connectivity	Assisted GPS	Yes (only in devices with cellular option)		
Connectivity	GLONASS	Yes (only in devices with cellular option)		
Connectivity	SIM card form-factor	—N/a	Nano-SIM	
Connectivity	SIM card form-factor	eSIM		
Secure authentication	Touch ID	In Top Button		First generation
Secure authentication	Face ID	No		
Apple Pencil support		Apple Pencil (1st generation); Apple Pencil (USB-C)		Apple Pencil (1st generation)
Keyboard support	Bluetooth keyboard	Yes		
Keyboard support	Smart Keyboard	No		Yes
Keyboard support	Smart Keyboard Folio	No		
Keyboard support	Magic Keyboard	No		
Keyboard support	Magic Keyboard Folio	Yes		No
Sensors	LiDAR scanner	No		
Sensors	Three-axis gyro	Yes		
Sensors	Accelerometer	Yes		
Sensors	Ambient light sensor	Yes		
Sensors	Barometer	Yes		
Rear camera	Camera	12 MP wide		8 MP wide
Rear camera	Aperture	f/1.8		f/2.4
Rear camera	Optical image stabilization	No		
Rear camera	Auto image stabilization	Yes		
Rear camera	Element lens	Five-element lens		
Rear camera	Digital zoom	5×		
Rear camera	Live photos	Yes		
Rear camera	Flash	—N/a		
Rear camera	Wide color capture	No		
Rear camera	Autofocus	Yes		
Rear camera	HDR for photos	Smart HDR 4	Smart HDR 3	Yes
Rear camera	Video recording	4K at 24 fps, 25 fps, 30 fps or 60 fps 1080p HD at 25 fps, 30 fps or 60 fps		1080p HD at 30 fps
Rear camera	Extended dynamic range video	30 fps		No
Rear camera	Slow-motion video	1080p at 120 fps or 240 fps		720p at 120 fps
Rear camera	Video zoom	3×		
Rear camera	Time-lapse video with stabilization	Yes		
Front camera	Camera	Landscape 12 MP Center Stage		12 MP Ultra Wide
Front camera	Aperture	f/2.4		
Front camera	Center stage	Yes		
Front camera	Portrait mode	No		
Front camera	Portrait lighting	No		
Front camera	Animoji and Memoji	No		
Front camera	Live photos	Yes		
Front camera	Retina flash	Yes		
Front camera	Wide color capture	No		
Front camera	Video recording	1080p HD at 25 fps, 30 fps, 60 fps		
Front camera	Extended dynamic range video	30 fps		
Front camera	HDR	Smart HDR 4	Smart HDR 3	Yes
Front camera	Auto image stabilization	Yes		
Front camera	Cinematic video stabilization	Yes		
Front camera	FaceTime	Yes		
Audio		Two loudspeakers, adjusting sound to device orientation		
3.5 mm jack		No		Yes
Materials	Front	Black glass front		
Materials	Back	Flat aluminum back and bezel Wi-Fi + Cellular models also have a long, thin line of plastic for the cellular antenna. The color of the plastic is dependent on the device.		Contoured aluminum back and bezel Wi-Fi + Cellular models also have a piece of plastic for the cellular antenna. The color of the plastic is black or white.
Colors				
Power		3.8 V 28.9 W·h (7,606 mA·h)		3.73 V 32.9 W·h (8,827 mA·h)
Dimensions	Height	248.6 mm (9.79 in)		250.6 mm (9.87 in)
Dimensions	Width	179.5 mm (7.07 in)		174.1 mm (6.85 in)
Dimensions	Depth	7 mm (0.28 in)		7.5 mm (0.30 in)
Weight	Wi-Fi	477 g (1.05 lb)		487 g (1.07 lb)
Weight	Wi-Fi + Cellular	481 g (1.06 lb)		498 g (1.10 lb)
Total greenhouse gas emissions		74 kg CO_{2}e	72 kg CO_{2}e	75 kg CO_{2}e
Hardware strings		iPad15,7 iPad15,8	iPad13,18 iPad13,19	iPad12,1 iPad12,2
Model number		A3354; A3355; A3356	A2696; A2757; A2777; A3162	A2602; A2603; A2604; A2605
Announced date		March 4, 2025	October 18, 2022	September 14, 2021
Released date		March 12, 2025	October 26, 2022	September 24, 2021
Discontinued date		In production	March 4, 2025	May 7, 2024
Unsupported date		Supported		

==== Unsupported (64-bit) ====
Model		iPad (8th generation)	iPad (7th generation)	iPad (6th generation)	iPad (5th generation)
Picture					
Initial release operating system		iPadOS 14.0	iPadOS 13.1	iOS 11.3	iOS 10.3
Latest release operating system		iPadOS 26.7.3	iPadOS 18.7.12	iPadOS 17.7.11	iPadOS 16.7.16
Display	Screen size	10.2 in (260 mm) (diagonal)		9.7 in (250 mm) (diagonal)	
Display	Backlight	LED-backlit			
Display	Multi-touch	Yes			
Display	Technology	Retina display with IPS technology			
Display	Resolution	2160 x 1620		2048 x 1536	
Display	Pixel Density (ppi)	264			
Display	Aspect Ratio	4:3			
Display	Typical Max brightness ( cd/m^{2})	500			
Display	HDR Max brightness ( cd/m^{2})	—N/a			
Display	Fingerprint-resistant oleophobic coating	Yes			
Display	Laminated Display	No			
Display	Anti-reflective coating	No			
Display	Reflectance	—N/a			
Display	Full sRGB Display	Yes			
Display	Wide Color Display (Display P3)	No			
Display	True Tone Display	No			
Display	Night Shift	Yes			
Display	ProMotion Display	No			
Display	HDR10 Content	No			
Display	Dolby Vision	No			
Processor	Chip	Apple A12 Bionic	Apple A10 Fusion		Apple A9
Processor	Technology Node	7 nm	16 nm		16 nm (TSMC) or 14 nm (Samsung)
Processor	Total Cores	6	4		2
Processor	High-Performance Cores	2 × Vortex	2 × Hurricane		2 × Twister
Processor	Energy-Efficiency Cores	4 × Tempest	2 × Zephyr		—N/a
Processor	Clock Speed	2.49 GHz	2.34 GHz		1.85 GHz
Processor	Bit	64-bit			
Processor	Motion Coprocessor	Embedded in SoC	Embedded M10		Embedded M9
Processor	Bus width	64-bit			
Processor	Graphics Processor	Apple-designed 4-core GPU (G11P)	PowerVR GT7600 Plus (6-core)		PowerVR GT7600 (6-core)
Processor	Neural Engine	8-core Neural Engine (5 TOPS)	—N/a		
Storage		32 GB, 128 GB			
Storage Type		NAND Flash driven by NVMe-based controller that communicates over a PCIe connection			
RAM		3 GB		2 GB	
RAM Type		LPDDR4X	LPDDR4		
Virtual Memory Swap		No			
Connector		8-pin Lightning connector with USB 2.0			
Connector		Smart Connector (side, for Smart Keyboard)		—N/a	
External Display Support		No			
Connectivity	Wi-Fi (802.11)	Wi-Fi 5 (802.11a/b/g/n/ac)			
Connectivity	Maximum Speed	866 Mbit/s			
Connectivity	MIMO	Yes			
Connectivity	Simultaneous dual band	No			
Connectivity	Bluetooth	Bluetooth 4.2			
Connectivity	Cellular	Gigabit-class LTE/UMTS/HSPA/HSPA+/DC‑HSDPA/GSM/EDGE (only in devices with cellular option)		LTE/UMTS/HSPA/HSPA+/DC‑HSDPA/GSM/EDGE (only in devices with cellular option)	
Connectivity	VoLTE	No			
Connectivity	Assisted GPS	Yes (only in devices with cellular option)			
Connectivity	GLONASS	Yes (only in devices with cellular option)			
Connectivity	SIM card form-factor	Nano-SIM			
Connectivity	SIM card form-factor	eSIM		Apple Physical SIM	
Secure Authentication	Touch ID	First generation			
Secure Authentication	Face ID	No			
Apple Pencil Support		Apple Pencil (1st generation)			No
Keyboard Support	Bluetooth Keyboard	Yes			
Keyboard Support	Smart Keyboard	Yes		No	
Keyboard Support	Smart Keyboard Folio	No			
Keyboard Support	Magic Keyboard	No			
Keyboard Support	Magic Keyboard Folio	No			
Sensors	LiDAR Scanner	No			
Sensors	Three-axis gyro	Yes			
Sensors	Accelerometer	Yes			
Sensors	Ambient Light Sensor	Yes			
Sensors	Barometer	Yes			
Rear Camera	Camera	8 MP Wide			
Rear Camera	Aperture	f/2.4			
Rear Camera	Optical image stabilization	No			
Rear Camera	Auto image stabilization	Yes			
Rear Camera	Element Lens	Five-element lens			
Rear Camera	Digital Zoom	5x			
Rear Camera	Live Photos	Yes			
Rear Camera	Flash	—N/a			
Rear Camera	Wide Color Capture	No			
Rear Camera	Autofocus	Yes			
Rear Camera	HDR for photos	Yes			
Rear Camera	Video Recording	1080p HD at 30 fps			
Rear Camera	Extended Dynamic Range Video	No			
Rear Camera	Slow-motion video	720p at 120 fps			
Rear Camera	Video Zoom	3x			
Rear Camera	Time-lapse video with stabilization	Yes			
Front Camera	Camera	1.2 MP FaceTime HD			
Front Camera	Aperture	f/2.4			
Front Camera	Center Stage	No			
Front Camera	Portrait Mode	No			
Front Camera	Portrait Lighting	No			
Front Camera	Animoji and Memoji	No			
Front Camera	Live Photos	Yes			
Front Camera	Retina Flash	Yes			
Front Camera	Wide color capture	No			
Front Camera	Video Recording	720p HD			
Front Camera	Extended Dynamic Range Video	No			
Front Camera	HDR	Yes			
Front Camera	Auto image stabilization	No			
Front Camera	Cinematic video stabilization	No			
Front Camera	FaceTime	Yes			
Audio		Two loudspeakers, adjusting sound to device orientation			
3.5 mm Jack		Yes			
Materials	Front	Silver and Gold: White glass front Space Gray: Black glass front			
Materials	Back	Contoured aluminum back and bezel Wi-Fi + Cellular models also have a piece of plastic for the cellular antenna. The color of the plastic is black or white.			
Colors					
Power		3.73 V 32.9 W·h (8,827 mA·h)			
Dimensions	Height	250.6 mm (9.87 in)		240 mm (9.4 in)	
Dimensions	Width	174.1 mm (6.85 in)		169.5 mm (6.67 in)	
Dimensions	Depth	7.5 mm (0.30 in)			
Weight	Wi-Fi	490 g (1.08 lb)	483 g (1.06 lb)	469 g (1.03 lb)	
Weight	Wi-Fi + Cellular	495 g (1.09 lb)	493 g (1.09 lb)	478 g (1.05 lb)	
Total greenhouse gas emissions		70 kg CO_{2}e	87 kg CO_{2}e	98 kg CO_{2}e	135 kg CO_{2}e
Hardware strings		iPad11,6 iPad11,7	iPad7,11 iPad7,12	iPad7,5 iPad7,6	iPad6,11 iPad6,12
Model number		A2270; A2428; A2429; A2430	A2197; A2198; A2200	A1893; A1954	A1822; A1823
Announced Date		September 15, 2020	September 10, 2019	March 27, 2018	March 21, 2017
Released Date		September 18, 2020	September 25, 2019	March 27, 2018	March 24, 2017
Discontinued Date		September 14, 2021	September 15, 2020	September 10, 2019	March 27, 2018
Unsupported Date		Bug fixes, security updates only		May 11, 2026	

==== Unsupported (32-bit) ====
Model		iPad (4th generation)	iPad (3rd generation)	iPad 2	iPad (1st generation)
Picture					
Initial release operating system		iOS 6.0 (Wi-Fi) iOS 6.0.1 (Wi-Fi + Cellular)	iOS 5.1	iOS 4.3	iPhone OS 3.2
Latest release operating system		iOS 10.3.4 (Wi-Fi + Cellular) iOS 10.3.3 (Wi-Fi)	iOS 9.3.6 (Wi-Fi + Cellular (CDMA)) iOS 9.3.5 (Wi-Fi and Wi-Fi + Cellular (GSM))		iOS 5.1.1
Display		9.7 in (250 mm) LED-backlit with IPS technology, 2048 × 1536 px at 264 ppi, fingerprint-resistant oleophophic coating		9.7 in (250 mm) LED-backlit with IPS technology, 1024 × 768 px at 132 ppi, fingerprint-resistant oleophophic coating	
Processor		1.4 GHz dual-core Apple A6X SoC	1 GHz dual-core Apple A5X SoC	1 GHz dual-core Apple A5 SoC	1 GHz Apple A4 SoC
Bus frequency and width		128-bit		250 MHz (32-bit)	100 MHz (32-bit)
Graphics processor		PowerVR SGX554MP4 (4-core) GPU	PowerVR SGX543MP4 (4-core) GPU	PowerVR SGX543MP2 (2-core) GPU	PowerVR SGX535 GPU
Storage		16, 32, 64 or 128 GB	16, 32 or 64 GB		
RAM		1 GB LPDDR2 DRAM		512 MB Dual-Channel LPDDR2 DRAM	256 MB LPDDR DRAM
Connector		8-pin Lightning connector	30-pin connector		
Connectivity		Wi-Fi (802.11 a/b/g/n)			
SIM card form-factor		Micro-SIM			
Touch ID		No			
Apple Pencil support		No			
GLONASS		Yes (only in devices with cellular option)			
GPS		Yes (only in devices with cellular option)			
Digital compass		Yes			
Barometer		No			
Bluetooth		Bluetooth 4.0		Bluetooth 2.1 + EDR	
Cellular		GSM/EDGE (850, 900, 1800, 1900 MHz), UMTS/HSPA+/DC-HSDPA (850, 900, 1900, 2100 MHz), LTE (bands 2, 4, 5, 17); Wi-Fi + Cellular models on Verizon include: CDMA/EV-DO Rev. A and B (800, 1900, 2100 MHz), LTE (bands 1, 3, 5, 13, 25)	GSM/EDGE (850, 900, 1800, 1900 MHz), UMTS/HSPA+/DC-HSDPA (850, 900, 1900, 2100 MHz), LTE (bands 4, 17); Wi-Fi + Cellular models on Verizon include: CDMA/EV-DO Rev. A (800, 1900 MHz), LTE (band 13)	GSM/EDGE (850, 900, 1800, 1900 MHz), UMTS/HSPA (850, 900, 1900, 2100 MHz); Wi-Fi + Cellular models on Verizon include: CDMA/EV-DO Rev. A (800, 1900 MHz)	GSM/EDGE (850, 900, 1800, 1900 MHz), UMTS/HSPA (850, 1900, 2100 MHz)
Cameras	iSight	1080p HD video at 30 fps and 5 MP still photos 30 fps and 5× digital zoom		720p HD (0.9 MP) video at 30 fps and 0.7 MP photos	—N/a
Cameras	FaceTime	1.2 MP photos, 720p video	VGA (0.3 MP) photos and video at up to 30 fps		—N/a
Audio codec		Cirrus Logic CLI1583B0/CS35L19	Cirrus Logic CLI1560B0	Cirrus Logic CS42L63	Cirrus Logic CS42L61
Made for iPhone hearing aids compatible		Yes	—N/a		
Live Listen		Yes	—N/a		
Materials		Contoured aluminum back and bezel Wi-Fi + Cellular models also have a piece of plastic for the cellular antenna. The color of the plastic is black.			
Power		3.7 V 43 W·h (11,560 mA·h)	3.7 V 42.5 W·h (11,487 mA·h)	3.8 V 25 W·h (6,579 mA·h)	3.75 V 24.8 W·h (6,613 mA·h)
Dimensions		241 mm (9.5 in) H 186 mm (7.3 in) W 9.4 mm (0.37 in) D		241.2 mm (9.50 in) H 185.7 mm (7.31 in) W 8.8 mm (0.35 in) D	242.8 mm (9.56 in) H 189.7 mm (7.47 in) W 13.4 mm (0.53 in) D
Weight		Wi-Fi: 652 g (1.44 lb); Wi-Fi + Cellular: 662 g (1.46 lb)	Wi-Fi: 650 g (1.43 lb); Wi-Fi + Cellular: 660 g (1.46 lb)	Wi-Fi: 601 g (1.32 lb); GSM model: 613 g (1.35 lb); CDMA model: 607 g (1.34 lb)	Wi-Fi: 680 g (1.50 lb); Wi-Fi + 3G: 730 g (1.61 lb)
Greenhouse gas emissions		170 kg CO_{2}e; 220 kg CO_{2}e	180 kg CO_{2}e	105 kg CO_{2}e; 130 kg CO_{2}e	130 kg CO_{2}e
Hardware strings		iPad3,4 iPad3,5 iPad3,6	iPad3,1 iPad3,2 iPad3,3	iPad2,1 iPad2,2 iPad2,3 iPad2,4	iPad1,1
Model number		A1458 (Wi-Fi); A1459 (Wi-Fi + Cellular); A1460 (Wi-Fi + Cellular (MM))	A1416 (Wi-Fi); A1403 (Wi-Fi + Cellular (VZ)); A1430 (Wi-Fi + Cellular)	A1395 (Wi-Fi); A1396 (GSM model); A1397 (CDMA model)	A1219 (Wi-Fi); A1337 (Wi-Fi + 3G)
FCCID		BCGA1458; BCGA1459; BCGA1460	BCGA1416; BCGA1403; BCGA1430	BCGA1395; BCGA1396; BCGA1397	BCG-E2381A; BCG-E2328A (GSM)
Released		November 2, 2012	March 16, 2012	March 11, 2011	April 3, 2010
Discontinued		October 16, 2014	October 23, 2012	March 18, 2014	March 2, 2011
Unsupported		July 19, 2017 (Wi-Fi); July 22, 2019 (Wi-Fi + Cellular)	August 25, 2016 (Wi-Fi and Wi-Fi + Cellular (GSM)); July 22, 2019 (Wi-Fi + Cellular (CDMA))		September 19, 2012

=== iPad Mini ===
Model	Announced	Release(d)		Discontinued	Support		
Model	Announced	With OS	Date	Discontinued	Latest OS	Ended	Lifespan
iPad Mini (1st)	October 23, 2012	iOS 6.0	November 2, 2012	June 19, 2015	iOS 9.3.5 iOS 9.3.6	August 25, 2016 (Wi-Fi); July 22, 2019 (Wi-Fi + Cellular)	3 years, 9 months (Wi-Fi); 6 years, 8 months (Wi-Fi + Cellular)
iPad Mini 2	October 22, 2013	iOS 7.0.3	November 12, 2013	March 21, 2017	iOS 12.5.8	January 26, 2026	12 years, 2 months
iPad Mini 3	October 16, 2014	iOS 8.1	October 22, 2014	September 9, 2015	iOS 12.5.8	January 26, 2026	11 years, 3 months
iPad Mini 4	September 9, 2015	iOS 9.0	September 9, 2015	March 18, 2019	iPadOS 15.8.8	May 11, 2026	10 years, 8 months
iPad Mini (5th)	March 18, 2019	iOS 12.2	March 18, 2019	September 14, 2021	iPadOS 26.7.3	November 9, 2026	7 years, 8 months
iPad Mini (6th)	September 14, 2021	iPadOS 15.0	September 24, 2021	October 15, 2024	Latest iPadOS iPadOS 27.2.1	Supported; November 9, 2026	5 years, 2 months
iPad Mini (A17 Pro)	October 15, 2024	iPadOS 18.0	October 23, 2024	October 26, 2026	Latest iPadOS iPadOS 27.2.1	Supported; November 9, 2026	2 years
iPad Mini (A20 Pro)	October 26, 2026	iPadOS 27.0	November 6, 2026	Current	Latest iPadOS iPadOS 27.2.1	Supported; November 9, 2026	0 months

==== Supported ====
Model		iPad Mini (A20 Pro)	iPad Mini (A17 Pro)	iPad Mini (6th generation)
Initial release operating system		iPadOS 27.0	iPadOS 18.0	iPadOS 15.0
Latest release operating system		iPadOS 27.2.1		
Display	Screen size	8.5 in (220 mm) (diagonal)	8.3 in (210 mm) (diagonal)	
Display	Backlight	—N/a	LED-backlit	
Display	Multi-touch	Yes		
Display	Technology	Super Retina XDR display with OLED	Liquid Retina display with IPS technology	
Display	Resolution	2316 x 1512	2266 x 1488	
Display	Pixel Density (ppi)	326		
Display	Aspect Ratio	~3:2		
Display	Typical Max brightness ( cd/m^{2})	600	500	
Display	HDR Max brightness ( cd/m^{2})	600 (Full screen); 1200 (HDR content)	—N/a	
Display	Fingerprint-resistant oleophobic coating	Yes		
Display	Laminated Display	Yes		
Display	Anti-reflective coating	Yes		
Display	Reflectance	?	1.8 %	
Display	Full sRGB Display	Yes		
Display	Wide Color Display (Display P3)	Yes		
Display	True Tone Display	Yes		
Display	Night Shift	Yes		
Display	ProMotion Display	No		
Display	HDR10 Content	Yes		
Display	Dolby Vision	With HDR		Yes
Processor	Chip	Apple A20 Pro	Apple A17 Pro	Apple A15 Bionic
Processor	Technology Node	2 nm (N2)	3 nm (N3)	5 nm (N5P)
Processor	Total Cores	5 (Models with 128 GB or 256 GB storage); 6 (Models with 512 GB storage)	6	
Processor	High-Performance Cores	2		2 × Avalanche
Processor	Energy-Efficiency Cores	3 (Models with 128 GB or 256 GB storage); 4 (Models with 512 GB storage)	4	4 × Blizzard
Processor	Clock Speed	4.93 GHz	3.78 GHz	2.93 GHz
Processor	Bit	64-bit		
Processor	Motion Coprocessor	Embedded in SoC		
Processor	Bus width	96-bit	64-bit	
Processor	Graphics Processor	Apple designed 7-core GPU with hardware ray tracing	Apple designed 5-core GPU (G16P)	Apple designed 5-core GPU (G14P)
Processor	Neural Engine	16-core Neural Engine (Models with 128 GB or 256 GB storage); Dual 16-core Neural Engine (Models with 512 GB storage)	16-core Neural Engine (35 TOPS)	16-core Neural Engine (15.8 TOPS)
Storage		128 GB, 256 GB, 512 GB		64 GB, 256 GB
Storage Type		NAND Flash driven by NVMe-based controller that communicates over a PCIe connection		
RAM		12 GB	8 GB	4 GB
RAM Type		LPDDR5X 4266 MHz (102.4 GB/s)	LPDDR5 3200 MHz (51.2 GB/s)	LPDDR4X 2133 MHz (34.1 GB/s)
Connector	Main Connector	USB-C port supporting charging and DisplayPort protocols among others		
Connector	Side Connector	—N/a		
Connector	Transmission Speed	Up to 10 Gbit/s transmission speeds (USB 3.1 Gen 2)		Up to 5 Gbit/s transmission speeds (USB 3.0)
Connector	External Display Support	One display up to 4K resolution at 60 Hz		One display up to 4K resolution at 30 Hz or 1080p resolution at 60 Hz
Apple Pencil Support		Apple Pencil Pro; Apple Pencil (USB-C)		Apple Pencil (2nd generation); Apple Pencil (USB-C)
Keyboard Support	Bluetooth Keyboard	Yes		
Keyboard Support	Smart Keyboard	No		
Keyboard Support	Smart Keyboard Folio	No		
Keyboard Support	Magic Keyboard	No		
Connectivity	Wi-Fi (802.11)	Wi-Fi 7 (802.11be)	Wi-Fi 6E (802.11a/b/g/n/ac/ax)	Wi-Fi 6 (802.11a/b/g/n/ac/ax)
Connectivity	MIMO	Yes		
Connectivity	Simultaneous Dual Band	Yes		
Connectivity	Maximum Wi-Fi Speed	5.8 Gbit/s	2.4 Gbit/s	1.2 Gbit/s
Connectivity	Bluetooth	Bluetooth 6	Bluetooth 5.3	Bluetooth 5.0
Connectivity	Cellular (Cellular models only)	UMTS/HSPA/HSPA+ 5G (sub-6 GHz)/Gigabit LTE up to 32 bands	UMTS/HSPA+/DC-HSDPA/Gigabit-class LTE up to 31 bands/5G (sub-6 GHz)	UMTS/HSPA+/DC-HSDPA/Gigabit-class LTE up to 32 bands/5G (sub-6 GHz)
Connectivity	Assisted GPS (Cellular models only)	Yes		
Connectivity	GLONASS/GNSS (Cellular models only)	Yes		
Connectivity	SIM card form-factor (Cellular models only)	—N/a		Nano-SIM
Connectivity	SIM card form-factor (Cellular models only)	eSIM		
Secure Authentication	Touch ID	In Top Button		
Secure Authentication	Face ID	No		
Sensors	LiDAR sensor	No		
Sensors	Three-axis gyro	Yes		
Sensors	Accelerometer	Yes		
Sensors	Ambient Light Sensor	Yes		
Sensors	Barometer	Yes		
Rear Camera	Camera	12 MP Wide		
Rear Camera	Aperture	f/1.8		
Rear Camera	Optical Image Stabilization	No		
Rear Camera	Auto Image Stabilization	Yes		
Rear Camera	Element Lens	Five-element lens		
Rear Camera	Optical Zoom	1x		
Rear Camera	Digital Zoom	5x		
Rear Camera	Autofocus	With Focus Pixels		
Rear Camera	Panorama	Up to 63 MP		
Rear Camera	Lens Cover	—N/a		
Rear Camera	Burst Mode	Yes		
Rear Camera	Flash	Adaptive True Tone flash	True Tone flash	Quad-LED True Tone flash
Rear Camera	Live Photos	Yes		
Rear Camera	Wide Color Capture	Yes		
Rear Camera	HDR for photos	Smart HDR 4		Smart HDR 3
Rear Camera	Video Recording	4K at 24 fps, 25 fps, 30 fps or 60 fps 1080p HD at 25 fps, 30 fps or 60 fps		
Rear Camera	Extended Dynamic Range Video	30 fps		
Rear Camera	Optical Image Stabilization for Video	No		
Rear Camera	Optical Video Zoom	1x		
Rear Camera	Digital Video Zoom	3x		
Rear Camera	Slow-motion video	1080p at 120 fps or 240 fps		
Rear Camera	Audio Zoom	No		
Rear Camera	Time-lapse video with stabilization	Yes		
Rear Camera	Cinematic video stabilization	4K, 1080p and 720p		
Rear Camera	Stereo Recording	No		
Front Camera	Camera	Landscape 12 MP Center Stage	12 MP Ultra Wide	
Front Camera	Aperture	f/2.0	f/2.4	
Front Camera	Center Stage	Yes		
Front Camera	Portrait Mode	No		
Front Camera	Portrait Lighting	No		
Front Camera	Animoji and Memoji	No		
Front Camera	Live Photos	Yes		
Front Camera	Wide color capture	Yes		
Front Camera	Retina Flash	Yes		
Front Camera	Video Recording	1080p HD video recording at 25 fps, 30 fps, or 60 fps		
Front Camera	Extended Dynamic Range Video	30 fps		
Front Camera	HDR for photos	Smart HDR 4		Smart HDR 3
Front Camera	Cinematic video stabilization	1080p and 720p		
Front Camera	Auto Image Stabilization	Yes		
Front Camera	FaceTime	Yes		
Audio	Playback	Stereo audio using Acoustic Display	Landscape stereo speakers	
Audio	Dolby Atmos	Built-in speakers and headphones with Spatial Audio		
Audio	3.5 mm Jack	No		
Materials	Front	All models have black glass front		
Materials	Back	Flat aluminum back and bezel Wi-Fi + Cellular models also have a long, thin line of plastic for the cellular antenna on top and bottom. The color of the plastic is dependent on the device.		
Colors				
Power		3.855 V 18.89 W·h (4,900 mA·h)	3.81 V 19.19 W·h (5,034 mA·h)	
Included Charger		20 W (9 V 2.22 A) USB-C; Charger is not included in the European Union and United Kingdom		20 W (9 V 2.22 A) USB-C
Dimensions	Height	195.3 mm (7.69 in)	195.4 mm (7.69 in)	
Dimensions	Width	132.6 mm (5.22 in)	134.8 mm (5.31 in)	
Dimensions	Depth	5.4 mm (0.21 in)	6.3 mm (0.25 in)	
Weight	Wi-Fi	255 g (0.56 lb)	293 g (0.65 lb)	
Weight	Wi-Fi + Cellular	263 g (0.58 lb)	297 g (0.65 lb)	
Total greenhouse gas emissions		69 kg CO_{2}e	65 kg CO_{2}e	68 kg CO_{2}e
Hardware strings		iPad19,1 iPad19,2	iPad16,1 iPad16,2	iPad14,1 iPad14,2
Model number		A3595; A3596; A3597	A2993; A2995; A2996	A2567; A2568; A2569
Announced Date		October 26, 2026	October 15, 2024	September 14, 2021
Released Date		November 6, 2026	October 23, 2024	September 24, 2021
Discontinued Date		In production	October 26, 2026	October 15, 2024
Unsupported Date		Supported		

==== Unsupported ====
Model		iPad mini (5th generation)	iPad mini 4	iPad mini 3	iPad mini 2	iPad mini (1st generation)
Picture						
Initial release operating system		iOS 12.2	iOS 9.0	iOS 8.1	iOS 7.0.3 (Wi-Fi, Wi-Fi + Cellular) iOS 7.1 (Wi-Fi + Cellular (TD-LTE))	iOS 6.0 (Wi-Fi) iOS 6.0.1 (Wi-Fi + Cellular)
Latest release operating system		iPadOS 26.7.3	iPadOS 15.8.8	iOS 12.5.8		iOS 9.3.6 (Wi-Fi + Cellular) iOS 9.3.5 (Wi-Fi)
Display	Screen size	7.9 in (200 mm) (diagonal)				
Display	Backlight	LED-backlit				
Display	Multi-Touch	Yes				
Display	Technology	Retina display with IPS technology				IPS technology
Display	Resolution	2048 x 1536				1024 x 768
Display	Pixel density (ppi)	326				163
Display	Aspect Ratio	4:3				
Display	Typical Max brightness ( cd/m^{2})	500	400			
Display	HDR Max brightness ( cd/m^{2})	—N/a				
Display	Fingerprint-resistant oleophobic coating	Yes				
Display	Laminated display	Yes		No		
Display	Anti-reflective coating	Yes		No		
Display	Reflectance	1.8%	2.0%	—N/a		
Display	Full sRGB display	Yes		No		
Display	Wide color display (Display P3)	Yes	No			
Display	True Tone display	Yes	No			
Display	Night Shift	Yes				No
Display	ProMotion technology	No				
Display	HDR10 content	No				
Display	Dolby Vision	No				
Processor	Chip	Apple A12 Bionic	Apple A8	Apple A7		Apple A5
Processor	Technology Node	7 nm (N7)	20 nm	28 nm		32 nm
Processor	Total Cores	6	2			
Processor	High-Performance Cores	2 × Vortex	2 × Typhoon	2 × Cyclone		2 × ARM Cortex-A9
Processor	Energy-Efficiency Cores	4 × Tempest	—N/a			
Processor	Clock Speed	2.49 GHz	1.5 GHz	1.3 GHz		1.0 GHz
Processor	Bit	64-bit				32-bit
Processor	Motion Coprocessor	Embedded in SoC	M8	M7		—N/a
Processor	Bus width	64-bit				
Processor	Graphics Processor	Apple-designed 4-core GPU (G11P)	PowerVR 6XT Series GX6450 (4-core)	PowerVR 6 Series G6430 (4-core)		PowerVR SGX543 (2-core)
Processor	Neural Engine	8-core Neural Engine (5 TOPS)	—N/a			
Storage		64 GB, 256 GB	16 GB, 32 GB, 64 GB, 128 GB	16 GB, 64 GB, 128 GB	16 GB, 32 GB, 64 GB, 128 GB	16 GB, 32 GB, 64 GB
Storage Type		NAND Flash driven by NVMe-based controller that communicates over a PCIe connection	NAND Flash (eMMC)			
RAM		3 GB	2 GB	1 GB		512 MB
RAM Type		LPDDR4X 2133 MHz (34.1 GB/s)	LPDDR3 800 MHz (12.8 GB/s)			LPDDR2 400 MHz (6.4 GB/s)
Connector	Main Connector	8-pin Lightning connector supporting charging				
Connector	Side Connector	—N/a				
Connector	Transmission Speed	Up to 480 Mbit/s transmission speeds (USB 2.0)				
Connector	External Display Support	No				
Apple Pencil Support		Apple Pencil (1st generation)	No			
Keyboard Support	Bluetooth Keyboard	Yes				
Keyboard Support	Smart Keyboard	No				
Keyboard Support	Smart Keyboard Folio	No				
Keyboard Support	Magic Keyboard	No				
Connectivity	Wi-Fi (802.11)	Wi-Fi (802.11a/b/g/n/ac)		Wi-Fi (802.11a/b/g/n)		
Connectivity	MIMO	Yes				No
Connectivity	Simultaneous dual band	Yes	No			
Connectivity	Maximum Wi-Fi Speed	866 Mbit/s		300 Mbit/s		
Connectivity	Bluetooth	Bluetooth 5.0	Bluetooth 4.2	Bluetooth 4.0		
Connectivity	Cellular (Cellular models only)	GSM/EDGE/UMTS/HSPA+/DC-HSDPA/Gigabit-class LTE up to 28 bands	GSM/EDGE/UMTS/HSPA+/DC-HSDPA/CDMA EV-DO Rev. A and Rev. B/LTE up to 20 bands CDMA EV-DO Rev. A and Rev. B is available in some models	GSM/EDGE/UMTS/HSPA+/DC-HSDPA/CDMA EV-DO Rev. A and Rev. B/LTE up to 14 bands CDMA EV-DO Rev. A and Rev. B is available in some models		GSM/EDGE/UMTS/HSPA+/DC-HSDPA/CDMA EV-DO Rev. A and Rev. B/LTE up to 5 bands CDMA EV-DO Rev. A and Rev. B is available in some models
Connectivity	Assisted GPS (Cellular models only)	Yes				
Connectivity	GLONASS/GNSS (Cellular models only)	Yes				
Connectivity	SIM card form-factor (Cellular models only)	Nano-SIM				
Connectivity	SIM card form-factor (Cellular models only)	eSIM	Apple Physical SIM		—N/a	
Secure Authentication	Touch ID	Second generation sensor in Home Button		First generation sensor in Home Button	No	
Secure Authentication	Face ID	No				
Sensors	LiDAR sensor	No				
Sensors	Three-axis gyro	Yes				
Sensors	Accelerometer	Yes				
Sensors	Ambient light sensor	Yes				
Sensors	Barometer	Yes		No		
Rear Camera	Camera	8 MP		5 MP		
Rear Camera	Aperture	f/2.4				
Rear Camera	Optical Image Stabilization	No				
Rear Camera	Auto Image Stabilization	Yes		No		
Rear Camera	Element Lens	Five-element lens				
Rear Camera	Optical Zoom	1x				
Rear Camera	Digital Zoom	5x				
Rear Camera	Autofocus	Yes				
Rear Camera	Panorama	Up to 43 MP		Supported		—N/a
Rear Camera	Lens Cover	—N/a				
Rear Camera	Burst Mode	Yes		No		
Rear Camera	Flash	—N/a				
Rear Camera	Live Photos	Yes	No			
Rear Camera	Wide Color Capture	Yes	No			
Rear Camera	HDR for photos	Auto HDR		Yes		
Rear Camera	Video Recording	1080p HD video recording at 30 fps				
Rear Camera	Extended Dynamic Range Video	No				
Rear Camera	Optical Image Stabilization for Video	No				
Rear Camera	Optical Video Zoom	1x				
Rear Camera	Digital Video Zoom	3x				
Rear Camera	Slow-motion video	720p at 120 fps		—N/a		
Rear Camera	Audio Zoom	No				
Rear Camera	Time-lapse video with stabilization	Yes		No		
Rear Camera	Cinematic video stabilization	No				
Rear Camera	Stereo Recording	No				
Front Camera	Camera	7 MP FaceTime HD	1.2 MP FaceTime HD			
Front Camera	Aperture	f/2.2		f/2.4		
Front Camera	Center Stage	No				
Front Camera	Portrait Mode	No				
Front Camera	Portrait Lighting	No				
Front Camera	Animoji and Memoji	No				
Front Camera	Live Photos	Yes	No			
Front Camera	Wide color capture	Yes	No			
Front Camera	Retina Flash	Yes	No			
Front Camera	Video Recording	1080p HD video recording at 30 fps	720p HD video recording at 30 fps			
Front Camera	Extended Dynamic Range Video	No				
Front Camera	HDR for photos	Auto HDR	No			
Front Camera	Cinematic video stabilization	No				
Front Camera	Auto Image Stabilization	No				
Front Camera	FaceTime	Yes				
Audio	Playback	Stereo speakers				
Audio	Dolby Atmos	No				
Audio	3.5 mm jack	Yes				
Materials	Front	Silver and Gold: White glass front Space Gray: Black glass front			Space Gray: Black glass front Silver: White glass front	Black & Slate: Black glass front White & Silver: White glass front
Materials	Back	Contoured aluminum back and bezel Wi-Fi + Cellular models also have a piece of plastic for the cellular antenna on top. The color of the plastic is dependent on the device.				
Colors						
Power		3.82 V 19.3 W·h (5,124 mA·h)		3.75 V 24.3 W·h (6,471 mA·h)		3.72 V 16.5 W·h (4,440 mA·h)
Included Charger		12 W (5 V 2.4 A) or 10 W (5 V 2 A) USB-A				
Dimensions	Height	203.2 mm (8.00 in)		200 mm (7.9 in)		
Dimensions	Width	134.8 mm (5.31 in)		134.7 mm (5.30 in)		
Dimensions	Depth	6.1 mm (0.24 in)		7.5 mm (0.30 in)		7.2 mm (0.28 in)
Weight	Wi-Fi	300.5 g (0.66 lb)	298.8 g (0.66 lb)	331 g (0.73 lb)		308 g (0.68 lb)
Weight	Wi-Fi + Cellular	308.2 g (0.68 lb)	304 g (0.67 lb)	341 g (0.75 lb)		312 g (0.69 lb)
Total greenhouse gas emissions		70 kg CO_{2}e	120 kg CO_{2}e	170 kg CO_{2}e		95 kg CO_{2}e
Hardware strings		iPad11,1 iPad11,2	iPad5,1 iPad5,2	iPad4,7 iPad4,8 iPad4,9	iPad4,4 iPad4,5 iPad4,6	iPad2,5 iPad2,6 iPad2,7
Model number		A2133; A2124; A2126; A2125	A1538; A1550	A1599; A1600; A1601	A1489; A1490; A1491	A1432; A1454; A1455
Announced Date		March 18, 2019	September 9, 2015	October 16, 2014	October 22, 2013	October 23, 2012
Released Date		March 18, 2019	September 9, 2015	October 22, 2014	November 12, 2013	Wi-Fi: November 2, 2012; Wi-Fi + Cellular: November 16, 2012
Discontinued Date		September 14, 2021	March 18, 2019	September 9, 2015	March 21, 2017	June 19, 2015
Unsupported Date		Bug fixes, security updates only	May 11, 2026	January 26, 2026		September 13, 2016 (Wi-Fi); July 22, 2019 (Wi-Fi + Cellular)

=== iPad Air ===
Model	Announced	Release(d)		Discontinued	Support		
Model	Announced	With OS	Date	Discontinued	Latest OS	Ended	Lifespan
iPad Air (1st)	October 22, 2013	iOS 7.0.3	November 1, 2013	March 21, 2016	iOS 12.5.8	January 26, 2026	12 years, 2 months
iPad Air 2	October 16, 2014	iOS 8.1	October 22, 2014	March 21, 2017	iPadOS 15.8.8	May 11, 2026	11 years, 6 months
iPad Air (3rd)	March 18, 2019	iOS 12.2	March 18, 2019	September 15, 2020	iPadOS 26.7.3	November 9, 2026	7 years, 8 months
iPad Air (4th)	September 15, 2020	iPadOS 14.0	October 23, 2020	March 8, 2022	Latest iPadOS iPadOS 27.2.1	Supported; November 9, 2026	6 years
iPad Air (5th)	March 8, 2022	iPadOS 15.4	March 18, 2022	May 7, 2024	Latest iPadOS iPadOS 27.2.1	Supported; November 9, 2026	4 years, 8 months
iPad Air (M2)	May 7, 2024	iPadOS 17.4	May 15, 2024	March 4, 2025	Latest iPadOS iPadOS 27.2.1	Supported; November 9, 2026	2 years, 6 months
iPad Air (M3)	March 4, 2025	iPadOS 18.3	March 12, 2025	March 2, 2026	Latest iPadOS iPadOS 27.2.1	Supported; November 9, 2026	1 year, 8 months
iPad Air (M4)	March 2, 2026	iPadOS 26.3	March 11, 2026	Current	Latest iPadOS iPadOS 27.2.1	Supported; November 9, 2026	8 months

==== Supported ====
Model		iPad Air 11-in. (M4)	iPad Air 13-in. (M4)	iPad Air 11-in. (M3)	iPad Air 13-in. (M3)	iPad Air 11-in. (M2)	iPad Air 13-in. (M2)	iPad Air (5th generation)	iPad Air (4th generation)
Picture									
Initial release operating system		iPadOS 26.3		iPadOS 18.3		iPadOS 17.4		iPadOS 15.4	iPadOS 14.0
Latest release operating system		iPadOS 27.2.1							
Display	Screen size	10.9 in (280 mm) (diagonal)	12.9 in (330 mm) (diagonal)	10.9 in (280 mm) (diagonal)	12.9 in (330 mm) (diagonal)	10.9 in (280 mm) (diagonal)	12.9 in (330 mm) (diagonal)	10.9 in (280 mm) (diagonal)	
Display	Backlight	LED-backlit							
Display	Multi-touch	Yes							
Display	Technology	Liquid Retina display with IPS technology							
Display	Resolution	2360 x 1640	2732 x 2048	2360 x 1640	2732 x 2048	2360 x 1640	2732 x 2048	2360 x 1640	
Display	Pixel Density (ppi)	264							
Display	Aspect Ratio	~10:7	4:3	~10:7	4:3	~10:7	4:3	~10:7	
Display	Typical Max brightness ( cd/m^{2})	500	600	500	600	500	600	500	
Display	HDR Max brightness ( cd/m^{2})	—N/a							
Display	Fingerprint-resistant oleophobic coating	Yes							
Display	Laminated Display	Yes							
Display	Anti-reflective coating	Yes							
Display	Reflectance	1.8 %							
Display	Full sRGB Display	Yes							
Display	Wide Color Display (Display P3)	Yes							
Display	True Tone Display	Yes							
Display	Night Shift	Yes							
Display	ProMotion Display	No							
Display	HDR10 Content	Yes							
Display	Dolby Vision	With HDR				Yes			
Display	Apple Pencil hover	Yes						No	
Processor	Chip	Apple M4		Apple M3		Apple M2		Apple M1	Apple A14 Bionic
Processor	Technology Node	3 nm (N3E)		3 nm (N3B)		5 nm (N5P)		5 nm (N5)	
Processor	Total Cores	8							6
Processor	High-Performance Cores	3		4		4 × Avalanche		4 × Firestorm	2 × Firestorm
Processor	Energy-Efficiency Cores	5		4		4 × Blizzard		4 × Icestorm	
Processor	Clock Speed	4.10 GHz, 2.89 GHz		4.06 GHz, 2.75 GHz		3.48 GHz, 2.42 GHz		3.19 GHz, 2.06 GHz	3.09 GHz, 1.82 GHz
Processor	Bit	64-bit							
Processor	Motion Coprocessor	Embedded in SoC							
Processor	Bus width	128-bit							64-bit
Processor	Graphics Processor	Apple designed 9-core GPU (G16G) with hardware ray tracing		Apple designed 9-core GPU (G15G) with hardware ray tracing		Apple designed 9-core GPU (G14G)		Apple designed 8-core GPU (G13G)	Apple designed 4-core GPU (G13P)
Processor	Media Engine	Hardware-accelerated 8K H.264, HEVC, ProRes and ProRes RAW; AV1 Decode		Hardware-accelerated 4K H.264, HEVC, ProRes and ProRes RAW; AV1 Decode		Hardware-accelerated H.264 and HEVC			—N/a
Processor	Neural Engine	16-core Neural Engine (38 TOPS)		16-core Neural Engine (18 TOPS)		16-core Neural Engine (15.8 TOPS)		16-core Neural Engine (11 TOPS)	
Storage		128 GB, 256 GB, 512 GB, 1 TB						64 GB, 256 GB	
Storage Type		PCIe-based SSD							NAND Flash driven by NVMe-based controller that communicates over a PCIe connection
RAM		12 GB		8 GB					4 GB
RAM Type		LPDDR5X 3750 MHz (120 GB/s)		LPDDR5 3200 MHz (102.4 GB/s)				LPDDR4X 2133 MHz (68.2 GB/s)	LPDDR4X 2133 MHz (34.1 GB/s)
Virtual Memory Swap		Yes						Requires iPadOS 16 and later 256 GB storage only	No
Connector	Main Connector	USB-C port supporting charging and DisplayPort protocols among others							
Connector	Side Connector	Back Smart Connector for Magic Keyboard; Magnetic connector (For Apple Pencil Pro)						Back Smart Connector for Smart Keyboard Folio and Magic Keyboard; Magnetic connector (For 2nd generation Apple Pencil)	
Connector	Transmission Speed	Up to 10 Gbit/s transmission speeds (USB 3.1 Gen 2)							Up to 5 Gbit/s transmission speeds (USB 3.0)
Connector	External Display Support	One display up to 6K resolution at 60 Hz							One display up to 4K resolution at 30 Hz or 1080p resolution at 60 Hz
Apple Pencil Support		Apple Pencil Pro; Apple Pencil (USB-C)						Apple Pencil (2nd generation); Apple Pencil (USB-C)	
Keyboard Support	Bluetooth Keyboard	Yes							
Keyboard Support	Smart Keyboard	No							
Keyboard Support	Smart Keyboard Folio	No						Yes	
Keyboard Support	Magic Keyboard	Yes							
Keyboard Support	Magic Keyboard Folio	No							
Connectivity	Wi-Fi (802.11)	Wi-Fi 7 (802.11a/b/g/n/ac/ax/be)		Wi-Fi 6E (802.11a/b/g/n/ac/ax)				Wi-Fi 6 (802.11a/b/g/n/ac/ax)	
Connectivity	MIMO	Yes							
Connectivity	Simultaneous Dual Band	Yes							
Connectivity	Maximum Wi-Fi Speed	5.8 Gbit/s		2.4 Gbit/s				1.2 Gbit/s	
Connectivity	Bluetooth	Bluetooth 6		Bluetooth 5.3				Bluetooth 5.0	
Connectivity	Cellular (Cellular models only)	UMTS/HSPA+/DC-HSDPA/Gigabit-class LTE up to 31 bands/5G (sub-6 GHz)						UMTS/HSPA+/DC-HSDPA/Gigabit-class LTE up to 32 bands/5G (sub-6 GHz)	GSM/EDGE/UMTS/HSPA+/DC-HSDPA/Gigabit-class LTE up to 30 bands
Connectivity	Assisted GPS (Cellular models only)	Yes							
Connectivity	GLONASS/GNSS (Cellular models only)	Yes							
Connectivity	SIM card form-factor (Cellular models only)	—N/a						Nano-SIM	
Connectivity	SIM card form-factor (Cellular models only)	eSIM							
Secure Authentication	Touch ID	In Top Button							
Secure Authentication	Face ID	No							
Sensors	LiDAR sensor	No							
Sensors	Three-axis gyro	Yes							
Sensors	Accelerometer	Yes							
Sensors	Ambient Light Sensor	Yes							
Sensors	Barometer	Yes							
Rear Camera	Camera	12 MP Wide							
Rear Camera	Aperture	f/1.8							
Rear Camera	Optical Image Stabilization	No							
Rear Camera	Auto Image Stabilization	Yes							
Rear Camera	Element Lens	Five-element lens							
Rear Camera	Optical Zoom	1x							
Rear Camera	Digital Zoom	5x zoom in							
Rear Camera	Autofocus	With Focus Pixels							
Rear Camera	Panorama	Up to 63 MP							
Rear Camera	Lens Cover	Sapphire crystal				—N/a			
Rear Camera	Burst Mode	Yes							
Rear Camera	Flash	—N/a							
Rear Camera	Live Photos	Yes							
Rear Camera	Wide Color Capture	Yes							
Rear Camera	HDR for photos	Smart HDR 4						Smart HDR 3	
Rear Camera	Video Recording	4K at 24 fps, 25 fps, 30 fps or 60 fps 1080p HD at 25 fps, 30 fps or 60 fps							
Rear Camera	ProRes Video	No							
Rear Camera	Extended Dynamic Range Video	30 fps							No
Rear Camera	Optical Image Stabilization for Video	No							
Rear Camera	Optical Video Zoom	1x							
Rear Camera	Digital Video Zoom	3x zoom in							
Rear Camera	Slow-motion video	1080p at 120 fps or 240 fps							
Rear Camera	Audio Zoom	No							
Rear Camera	Time-lapse video with stabilization	Yes							
Rear Camera	Cinematic video stabilization	4K, 1080p and 720p							1080p and 720p
Rear Camera	Stereo Recording	No							
Front Camera	Camera	Landscape 12 MP Center Stage						12 MP Ultra Wide	7 MP FaceTime HD
Front Camera	Aperture	f/2.0						f/2.4	f/2.2
Front Camera	Center Stage	Yes							No
Front Camera	Portrait Mode	No							
Front Camera	Portrait Lighting	No							
Front Camera	Animoji and Memoji	No							
Front Camera	Live Photos	Yes							
Front Camera	Wide color capture	Yes							
Front Camera	Retina Flash	Yes							
Front Camera	Video Recording	1080p HD video recording at 25 fps, 30 fps, or 60 fps							1080p HD video recording at 30 fps, or 60 fps
Front Camera	ProRes Video	No							
Front Camera	Extended Dynamic Range Video	30 fps							No
Front Camera	HDR for photos	Smart HDR 4						Smart HDR 3	
Front Camera	Cinematic video stabilization	1080p and 720p							No
Front Camera	Auto Image Stabilization	Yes							
Front Camera	FaceTime	Yes							
Audio	Playback	Landscape stereo speakers						Stereo speakers	
Audio	Dolby Atmos	Built-in speakers and headphones with Spatial Audio							
Audio	3.5 mm Jack	No							
Audio	Microphone	Two microphones							
Materials	Front	All models have black glass front							
Materials	Back	Flat aluminum back and bezel Wi-Fi + Cellular models also have a long, thin line of plastic for the cellular antenna on top and bottom. The color of the plastic is dependent on the device.							
Colors									
Power		28.93 W·h	36.59 W·h	28.93 W·h	36.59 W·h	28.93 W·h	36.59 W·h	3.8 V 28.6 W·h (7,606 mA·h)	
Included Charger		20 W (9 V 2.22 A) USB-C; Charger is not included in the European Union and United Kingdom						20 W (9 V 2.22 A) USB-C	
Dimensions	Height	247.6 mm (9.75 in)	280.6 mm (11.05 in)	247.6 mm (9.75 in)	280.6 mm (11.05 in)	247.6 mm (9.75 in)	280.6 mm (11.05 in)	247.6 mm (9.75 in)	
Dimensions	Width	178.5 mm (7.03 in)	214.9 mm (8.46 in)	178.5 mm (7.03 in)	214.9 mm (8.46 in)	178.5 mm (7.03 in)	214.9 mm (8.46 in)	178.5 mm (7.03 in)	
Dimensions	Depth	6.1 mm (0.24 in)							
Weight	Wi-Fi	464 g (1.02 lb)	616 g (1.36 lb)	460 g (1.01 lb)	616 g (1.36 lb)	462 g (1.02 lb)	617 g (1.36 lb)	461 g (1.02 lb)	458 g (1.01 lb)
Weight	Wi-Fi + Cellular	465 g (1.03 lb)	617 g (1.36 lb)	460 g (1.01 lb)	617 g (1.36 lb)	462 g (1.02 lb)	618 g (1.36 lb)	462 g (1.02 lb)	460 g (1.01 lb)
Total greenhouse gas emissions		74 kg CO_{2}e	89 kg CO_{2}e	76 kg CO_{2}e	89 kg CO_{2}e	75 kg CO_{2}e	91 kg CO_{2}e	80 kg CO_{2}e	82 kg CO_{2}e
Hardware strings		iPad16,8 iPad16,9	iPad16,10 iPad16,11	iPad15,3 iPad15,4	iPad15,5 iPad15,6	iPad14,8 iPad14,9	iPad14,10 iPad14,11	iPad13,16 iPad13,17	iPad13,1 iPad13,2
Model number		A3459; A3460; A3463	A3461; A3462; A3464	A3266; A3267; A3270	A3268; A3269; A3271	A2902; A2903; A2904	A2898; A2899; A2900	A2588; A2589; A2591	A2316; A2072; A2324; A2325
Announced Date		March 2, 2026		March 4, 2025		May 7, 2024		March 8, 2022	September 15, 2020
Released Date		March 11, 2026		March 12, 2025		May 15, 2024		March 18, 2022	October 23, 2020
Discontinued Date		In production		March 2, 2026		March 4, 2025		May 7, 2024	March 8, 2022
Unsupported Date		Supported							

==== Unsupported ====
Model		iPad Air (3rd generation)	iPad Air 2	iPad Air (1st generation)
Picture				
Initial release operating system		iOS 12.2	iOS 8.1	iOS 7.0.3 (Wi-Fi and Wi-Fi + cellular) iOS 7.1 (Wi-Fi + cellular (TD-LTE))
Latest release operating system		iPadOS 26.7.3	iPadOS 15.8.8	iOS 12.5.8
Display	Screen size	10.5 in (270 mm) (diagonal)	9.7 in (250 mm) (diagonal)	
Display	Backlight	LED-backlit		
Display	Multi-touch	Yes		
Display	Technology	Retina display with IPS technology		
Display	Resolution	2224 x 1668	2048 x 1536	
Display	Pixel Density (ppi)	264		
Display	Aspect Ratio	4:3		
Display	Typical Max brightness ( cd/m^{2})	500	400	
Display	HDR Max brightness ( cd/m^{2})	—N/a		
Display	Fingerprint-resistant oleophobic coating	Yes		
Display	Laminated Display	Yes		No
Display	Anti-reflective coating	Yes		No
Display	Reflectance	1.8%	2.5%	—N/a
Display	Full sRGB Display	Yes		
Display	Wide Color Display (Display P3)	Yes	No	
Display	True Tone Display	Yes	No	
Display	Night Shift	Yes		
Display	ProMotion Display	No		
Display	HDR10 Content	No		
Display	Dolby Vision	No		
Processor	Chip	Apple A12 Bionic	Apple A8X	Apple A7
Processor	Technology Node	7 nm (N7)	20 nm	28 nm
Processor	Total Cores	6	3	2
Processor	High-Performance Cores	2 × Vortex	3 × Typhoon	2 × Cyclone
Processor	Energy-Efficiency Cores	4 × Tempest	—N/a	
Processor	Clock Speed	2.49 GHz, 1.49 GHz	1.50 GHz	1.40 GHz
Processor	Bit	64-bit		
Processor	Motion Coprocessor	Embedded in SoC	M8	M7
Processor	Bus width	64-bit	128-bit	64-bit
Processor	Graphics Processor	Apple-designed 4-core GPU (G11P)	PowerVR 6XT Series GX6850 (8-core)	PowerVR 6 Series G6430 (4-core)
Processor	Neural Engine	8-core Neural Engine (5 TOPS)	—N/a	
Processor	Media Engine	—N/a		
Storage		64 GB, 256 GB	16 GB, 32 GB, 64 GB, 128 GB	
Storage Type		NAND Flash driven by NVMe-based controller that communicates over a PCIe connection	NAND Flash (eMMC)	
RAM		3 GB	2 GB	1 GB
RAM Type		LPDDR4X 2133 MHz (34.1 GB/s)	LPDDR3 800 MHz (12.8 GB/s)	
Connector	Main Connector	8-pin Lightning connector port supporting charging		
Connector	Side Connector	—N/a		
Connector	Transmission Speed	Up to 0.480 Gbit/s transmission speeds (USB 2.0)		
Connector	External Display Support	No		
Apple Pencil Support		Apple Pencil (1st generation)	No	
Keyboard Support	Bluetooth Keyboard	Yes		
Keyboard Support	Smart Keyboard	Yes	No	
Keyboard Support	Smart Keyboard Folio	No		
Keyboard Support	Magic Keyboard	No		
Connectivity	Wi-Fi (802.11)	Wi-Fi 5 (802.11a/b/g/n/ac)		Wi-Fi 4 (802.11a/b/g/n); 802.11n in both 2.4 GHz and 5 GHz
Connectivity	MIMO	Yes		
Connectivity	Simultaneous Dual Band	Yes	No	
Connectivity	Maximum Wi-Fi Speed	0.866 Gbit/s		0.300 Gbit/s
Connectivity	Bluetooth	Bluetooth 5.0	Bluetooth 4.0	
Connectivity	Cellular (Cellular models only)	GSM/EDGE/UMTS/HSPA+/DC-HSDPA/Gigabit-class LTE up to 28 bands	GSM/EDGE/UMTS/HSPA+/DC-HSDPA/CDMA EV-DO Rev. A and Rev. B/LTE up to 20 bands CDMA EV-DO Rev. A and Rev. B is available in some models	GSM/EDGE/UMTS/HSPA+/DC-HSDPA/CDMA EV-DO Rev. A and Rev. B/LTE up to 14 bands CDMA EV-DO Rev. A and Rev. B is available in some models
Connectivity	Assisted GPS (Cellular models only)	Yes		
Connectivity	GLONASS/GNSS (Cellular models only)	Yes		
Connectivity	SIM card form-factor (Cellular models only)'	Nano-SIM		
Connectivity	SIM card form-factor (Cellular models only)'	eSIM	—N/a	
Secure Authentication	Touch ID	Second generation sensor in Home Button		No
Secure Authentication	Face ID	No		
Sensors	LiDAR sensor	No		
Sensors	Three-axis gyro	Yes		
Sensors	Accelerometer	Yes		
Sensors	Ambient Light Sensor	Yes		
Sensors	Barometer	Yes		No
Rear Camera	Camera	8 MP Wide		5 MP
Rear Camera	Aperture	f/2.4		
Rear Camera	Optical Image Stabilization	No		
Rear Camera	Auto Image Stabilization	Yes		No
Rear Camera	Element Lens	Five-element lens		
Rear Camera	Optical Zoom	1x		
Rear Camera	Digital Zoom	5x zoom in		
Rear Camera	Autofocus	Yes		
Rear Camera	Panorama	Up to 43 MP		—N/a
Rear Camera	Lens Cover	—N/a		
Rear Camera	Burst Mode	Yes		—N/a
Rear Camera	Flash	—N/a		
Rear Camera	Live Photos	Yes	No	
Rear Camera	Wide Color Capture	Yes	No	
Rear Camera	HDR for photos	Auto HDR	Yes	
Rear Camera	Video Recording	1080p HD at 30 fps		
Rear Camera	Extended Dynamic Range Video	No		
Rear Camera	Optical Image Stabilization for Video	No		
Rear Camera	Optical Video Zoom	1x		
Rear Camera	Digital Video Zoom	3x zoom in		
Rear Camera	Slow-motion video	720p at 120 fps		—N/a
Rear Camera	Audio Zoom	No		
Rear Camera	Time-lapse video with stabilization	Yes		Supports time-lapse video without stabilization
Rear Camera	Cinematic video stabilization	No		
Rear Camera	Stereo Recording	No		
Front Camera	Camera	7 MP FaceTime HD	1.2 MP FaceTime HD	
Front Camera	Aperture	f/2.2		f/2.4
Front Camera	Center Stage	No		
Front Camera	Portrait Mode	No		
Front Camera	Portrait Lighting	No		
Front Camera	Animoji and Memoji	No		
Front Camera	Live Photos	Yes	No	
Front Camera	Wide color capture	Yes	No	
Front Camera	Retina Flash	Yes	No	
Front Camera	Video Recording	1080p HD video recording at 30 fps	720p HD video recording at 30 fps	
Front Camera	Extended Dynamic Range Video	No		
Front Camera	HDR for photos	Auto HDR	No	
Front Camera	Cinematic video stabilization	No		
Front Camera	Auto Image Stabilization	No		
Front Camera	FaceTime	Yes		
Audio	Playback	Two loudspeakers at bottom in portrait orientation		
Audio	Dolby Atmos	Headphones with Spatial Audio	No	
Audio	3.5 mm Jack	Yes		
Audio	Microphone	Two microphones		
Materials	Front	Silver and Gold: White glass front Space Gray: Black glass front		Silver: White glass front Space Gray: Black glass front
Materials	Back	Contoured aluminum back and bezel Wi-Fi + Cellular models also have a piece of plastic for the cellular antenna on top. The color of the plastic is dependent on the device.		
Colors				
Power		3.77 V 30.8 W·h (8,134 mA·h)	3.76 V 27.3 W·h (7,340 mA·h)	3.73 V 32.4 W·h (8,827 mA·h)
Included Charger		12 W (5 V 2.4 A) or 10 W (5 V 2 A) USB-A		
Dimensions	Height	250.6 mm (9.87 in)	240 mm (9.4 in)	
Dimensions	Width	174.1 mm (6.85 in)	169.5 mm (6.67 in)	
Dimensions	Depth	6.1 mm (0.24 in)		7.5 mm (0.30 in)
Weight	Wi-Fi	456 g (1.01 lb)	437 g (0.96 lb)	469 g (1.03 lb)
Weight	Wi-Fi + Cellular	464 g (1.02 lb)	444 g (0.98 lb)	478 g (1.05 lb)
Total greenhouse gas emissions		86 kg CO_{2}e	190 kg CO_{2}e	210 kg CO_{2}e
Hardware strings		iPad11,3 iPad11,4	iPad5,3 iPad5,4	iPad4,1 iPad4,2 iPad4,3
Model number		A2152; A2123; A2153; A2154	A1566; A1567	A1474; A1475; A1476
Announced Date		March 18, 2019	October 16, 2014	October 22, 2013
Released Date		March 18, 2019	32 GB: September 7, 2016; 16 GB, 64 GB and 128 GB: October 24, 2014	November 1, 2013
Discontinued Date		September 15, 2020	32 and 128 GB: March 21, 2017; 16 GB and 64 GB: September 7, 2016	64 and 128 GB: October 16, 2014; 16 and 32 GB: March 21, 2016
Unsupported Date		Bug fixes, security updates only	May 11, 2026	January 26, 2026

=== iPad Pro ===
Model	Announced	Release(d)		Discontinued	Support		
Model	Announced	With OS	Date	Discontinued	Latest OS	Ended	Lifespan
iPad Pro (1st) 12.9-inch	September 9, 2015	iOS 9.1	November 11, 2015	June 5, 2017	iPadOS 16.7.16	May 11, 2026	10 years, 6 months
iPad Pro (1st) 9.7-inch	March 21, 2016	iOS 9.3	March 31, 2016	June 5, 2017	iPadOS 16.7.16	May 11, 2026	10 years, 1 month
iPad Pro (2nd)	June 5, 2017	iOS 10.3	June 13, 2017	October 30, 2018 (12.9" model); March 18, 2019 (10.5" model)	iPadOS 17.7.11	May 11, 2026	8 years, 10 months
iPad Pro (3rd)	October 30, 2018	iOS 12.1	November 7, 2018	March 18, 2020	iPadOS 26.7.3	November 9, 2026	8 years
iPad Pro (4th)	March 18, 2020	iPadOS 13.4	March 25, 2020	April 20, 2021	Latest iPadOS iPadOS 27.2.1	Supported; November 9, 2026	6 years, 7 months
iPad Pro (5th)	April 20, 2021	iPadOS 14.5	May 21, 2021	October 18, 2022	Latest iPadOS iPadOS 27.2.1	Supported; November 9, 2026	5 years, 5 months
iPad Pro (6th)	October 18, 2022	iPadOS 16.0	October 26, 2022	May 7, 2024	Latest iPadOS iPadOS 27.2.1	Supported; November 9, 2026	4 years
iPad Pro (M4)	May 7, 2024	iPadOS 17.4	May 15, 2024	October 15, 2025	Latest iPadOS iPadOS 27.2.1	Supported; November 9, 2026	2 years, 6 months
iPad Pro (M5)	October 15, 2025	iPadOS 26.0	October 22, 2025	Current	Latest iPadOS iPadOS 27.2.1	Supported; November 9, 2026	1 year

==== Supported ====
Model		iPad Pro 11-in. (M5)	iPad Pro 13-in. (M5)	iPad Pro 11-in. (M4)	iPad Pro 13-in. (M4)	iPad Pro 11-in. (4th generation)	iPad Pro 12.9-in. (6th generation)	iPad Pro 11-in. (3rd generation)	iPad Pro 12.9-in. (5th generation)	iPad Pro 11-in. (2nd generation)	iPad Pro 12.9-in. (4th generation)
Picture											
Initial release operating system		iPadOS 26.0		iPadOS 17.4		iPadOS 16.0		iPadOS 14.5		iPadOS 13.4	
Latest release operating system		iPadOS 27.2.1									
Display	Screen size	11.1 in (280 mm) (diagonal)	13 in (330 mm) (diagonal)	11.1 in (280 mm) (diagonal)	13 in (330 mm) (diagonal)	11 in (280 mm) (diagonal)	12.9 in (330 mm) (diagonal)	11 in (280 mm) (diagonal)	12.9 in (330 mm) (diagonal)	11 in (280 mm) (diagonal)	12.9 in (330 mm) (diagonal)
Display	Backlight	—N/a				LED-backlit	mini-LED-backlit with 2596 full-array local dimming zones	LED-backlit	mini-LED-backlit with 2596 full-array local dimming zones	LED-backlit	
Display	Multi-touch	Yes									
Display	Technology	Ultra Retina XDR display with Tandem OLED				Liquid Retina display with IPS technology	Liquid Retina XDR display with IPS technology	Liquid Retina display with IPS technology	Liquid Retina XDR display with IPS technology	Liquid Retina display with IPS technology	
Display	Resolution	2420 x 1668	2752 x 2064	2420 x 1668	2752 x 2064	2388 x 1668	2732 x 2048	2388 x 1668	2732 x 2048	2388 x 1668	2732 x 2048
Display	Pixel Density (ppi)	264									
Display	Aspect Ratio	~10:7	4:3	~10:7	4:3	~10:7	4:3	~10:7	4:3	~10:7	4:3
Display	Typical Max brightness ( cd/m^{2})	1000				600					
Display	XDR Max brightness ( cd/m^{2})	1000 (Full screen); 1600 (HDR Content)				—N/a	1000 (Full screen); 1600 (HDR Content)	—N/a	1000 (Full screen); 1600 (HDR Content)	—N/a	
Display	Fingerprint-resistant oleophobic coating	Yes									
Display	Laminated Display	Yes									
Display	Anti-reflective coating	Yes									
Display	Reflectance	?				1.8 %					
Display	Full sRGB Display	Yes									
Display	Wide Color Display (Display P3)	Yes									
Display	True Tone Display	Yes									
Display	Night Shift	Yes									
Display	ProMotion Display	From 10Hz to 120Hz				From 24Hz to 120Hz					
Display	HDR10 Content	Yes									
Display	Dolby Vision	With HDR								Yes	
Display	Apple Pencil hover	Yes						No			
Processor	Chip	Apple M5		Apple M4		Apple M2		Apple M1		Apple A12Z Bionic	
Processor	Technology Node	3 nm (N3P)		3 nm (N3E)		5 nm (N5P)		5 nm (N5)		7 nm (N7)	
Processor	Total Cores	9 (Models with 256 GB or 512 GB storage); 10 (Models with 1 TB or 2 TB storage)				8					
Processor	High-Performance Cores	3 (Models with 256 GB or 512 GB storage); 4 (Models with 1 TB or 2 TB storage)				4 × Avalanche		4 × Firestorm		4 × Vortex	
Processor	Energy-Efficiency Cores	6				4 × Blizzard		4 × Icestorm		4 × Tempest	
Processor	Clock Speed	4.42 GHz, 3.05 GHz		4.39 GHz, 2.89 GHz		3.49 GHz, 2.42 GHz		3.20 GHz, 2.06 GHz		2.49 GHz, 1.59 GHz	
Processor	Bit	64-bit									
Processor	Motion Coprocessor	Embedded in SoC									
Processor	Bus width	128-bit									
Processor	Graphics Processor	Eighth generation Apple designed 10-core GPU with hardware ray tracing		Seventh generation Apple designed 10-core GPU with hardware ray tracing		Fifth generation Apple designed 10-core GPU		Fourth generation Apple designed 8-core GPU		Second generation Apple designed 8-core GPU	
Processor	Media Engine	Hardware-accelerated 8K H.264, HEVC, ProRes and ProRes RAW; AV1 Decode				Hardware-accelerated H.264, HEVC, ProRes and ProRes RAW		Hardware-accelerated H.264 and HEVC		—N/a	
Processor	Neural Engine	16-core Neural Engine		16-core Neural Engine (38 TOPS)		16-core Neural Engine (15.8 TOPS)		16-core Neural Engine (11 TOPS)		8-core Neural Engine (5 TOPS)	
Storage		256 GB, 512 GB, 1 TB, 2 TB				128 GB, 256 GB, 512 GB, 1 TB, 2 TB				128 GB, 256 GB, 512 GB, 1 TB	
Storage Type		PCIe-based SSD								NAND Flash driven by NVMe-based controller that communicates over a PCIe connection	
RAM		12 GB (Models with 256 GB or 512 GB storage); 16 GB (Models with 1 TB or 2 TB storage)		8 GB (Models with 256 GB or 512 GB storage); 16 GB (Models with 1 TB or 2 TB storage)		8 GB (Models with 128 GB, 256 GB or 512 GB storage); 16 GB (Models with 1 TB or 2 TB storage)				6 GB	
RAM Type		LPDDR5X 4800 MHz (153.0 GB/s)		LPDDR5X 3750 MHz (120.0 GB/s)		LPDDR5 3200 MHz (102.4 GB/s)		LPDDR4X 2133 MHz (68.2 GB/s)			
Virtual Memory Swap		Yes						Requires iPadOS 16 and later		No	
Connector	Main Connector	Thunderbolt 3/USB4 USB-C port supporting charging and DisplayPort protocols among others								USB-C port supporting charging and DisplayPort protocols among others	
Connector	Side Connector	Back Smart Connector for Magic Keyboard for iPad Pro; Magnetic connector (For Apple Pencil Pro)				Back Smart Connector for Smart Keyboard Folio and Magic Keyboard; Magnetic connector (For 2nd generation Apple Pencil)					
Connector	Transmission Speed	Up to 40 Gbit/s transmission speed (Thunderbolt 3 or USB4) and up to 10 Gbit/s transmission speeds (USB 3.1 Gen 2)								Up to 10 Gbit/s transmission speeds (USB 3.1 Gen 2)	
Connector	External Display Support	One display up to 6K resolution at 60 Hz or up to 5K resolution at 120 Hz		One display up to 6K resolution at 60 Hz						One display up to 5K resolution at 60 Hz	
Apple Pencil Support		Apple Pencil Pro; Apple Pencil (USB-C)				Apple Pencil (2nd generation); Apple Pencil (USB-C)					
Keyboard Support	Bluetooth Keyboard	Yes									
Keyboard Support	Smart Keyboard	No									
Keyboard Support	Smart Keyboard Folio	No				Yes					
Keyboard Support	Magic Keyboard	For iPad Pro				Yes					
Keyboard Support	Magic Keyboard Folio	No									
Connectivity	Wi-Fi (802.11)	Wi-Fi 7 (802.11a/b/g/n/ac/ax/be)		Wi-Fi 6E (802.11a/b/g/n/ac/ax)				Wi-Fi 6 (802.11a/b/g/n/ac/ax)			
Connectivity	MIMO	Yes									
Connectivity	Simultaneous Dual Band	Yes									
Connectivity	Maximum Wi-Fi Speed	5.8 Gbit/s		2.4 Gbit/s				1.2 Gbit/s			
Connectivity	Bluetooth	Bluetooth 6		Bluetooth 5.3				Bluetooth 5.0			
Connectivity	Cellular (Cellular models only)	UMTS/HSPA+/DC-HSDPA/Gigabit-class LTE up to 31 bands/5G (sub-6 GHz)				UMTS/HSPA+/DC-HSDPA/Gigabit-class LTE up to 32 bands/5G (sub-6 GHz and mmWave); 5G mmWave is available in some models		GSM/EDGE/UMTS/HSPA+/DC-HSDPA/Gigabit-class LTE up to 32 bands/5G (sub-6 GHz and mmWave); 5G mmWave is available in some models		GSM/EDGE/UMTS/HSPA+/DC-HSDPA/Gigabit-class LTE up to 30 bands	
Connectivity	Assisted GPS (Cellular models only)	Yes									
Connectivity	GLONASS/GNSS (Cellular models only)	Yes									
Connectivity	SIM card form-factor (Cellular models only)	—N/a				Nano-SIM					
Connectivity	SIM card form-factor (Cellular models only)	eSIM									
Secure Authentication	Touch ID	No									
Secure Authentication	Face ID	Yes									
Sensors	LiDAR sensor	Yes									
Sensors	Three-axis gyro	Yes									
Sensors	Accelerometer	Yes									
Sensors	Ambient Light Sensor	Yes									
Sensors	Barometer	Yes									
Rear Camera	Camera	12 MP Wide				12 MP Wide; 10 MP Ultra Wide					
Rear Camera	Aperture	f/1.8				f/1.8 (Wide) f/2.4 (Ultra Wide)					
Rear Camera	Optical Image Stabilization	No									
Rear Camera	Auto Image Stabilization	Yes									
Rear Camera	Element Lens	Five-element lens				Five-elements lens (Wide and Ultra Wide)					
Rear Camera	Optical Zoom	1x				2x zoom out					
Rear Camera	Digital Zoom	5x zoom in									
Rear Camera	Autofocus	With Focus Pixels				With Focus Pixels (Wide only)					
Rear Camera	Panorama	Up to 63 MP									
Rear Camera	Lens Cover	Sapphire crystal lens cover									
Rear Camera	Burst Mode	Yes									
Rear Camera	Flash	Adaptive True Tone flash				Brighter True Tone flash					
Rear Camera	Live Photos	Yes									
Rear Camera	Wide Color Capture	Yes									
Rear Camera	HDR for photos	Smart HDR 4						Smart HDR 3		Smart HDR	
Rear Camera	Video Recording	4K at 24 fps, 25 fps, 30 fps or 60 fps 1080p HD at 25 fps, 30 fps or 60 fps									
Rear Camera	ProRes Video	1080p at 30 fps for 256 GB storage 4K at 30 fps for 512 GB storage and above 4K at 60 fps with external recording				1080p at 30 fps for 128 GB storage 4K at 30 fps for 256 GB storage and above		No			
Rear Camera	Extended Dynamic Range Video	30 fps								No	
Rear Camera	Optical Image Stabilization for Video	No									
Rear Camera	Optical Video Zoom	1x				2x zoom out					
Rear Camera	Digital Video Zoom	3x zoom in									
Rear Camera	Slow-motion video	1080p at 120 fps or 240 fps				1080p at 120 fps or 240 fps (Wide)					
Rear Camera	Audio Zoom	Yes									
Rear Camera	Time-lapse video with stabilization	Yes									
Rear Camera	Cinematic video stabilization	4K, 1080p and 720p								1080p and 720p	
Rear Camera	Stereo Recording	Yes									
Front Camera	Camera	Landscape 12 MP Center Stage				12 MP TrueDepth with Ultra Wide				7 MP TrueDepth	
Front Camera	Aperture	f/2.0				f/2.4				f/2.2	
Front Camera	Center Stage	Yes								No	
Front Camera	Portrait Mode	With advanced bokeh and Depth Control									
Front Camera	Portrait Lighting	With six effects (Natural, Studio, Contour, Stage, Stage Mono, High‑Key Mono)									
Front Camera	Animoji and Memoji	Yes									
Front Camera	Live Photos	Yes									
Front Camera	Wide color capture	Yes									
Front Camera	Retina Flash	With True Tone				Yes					
Front Camera	Video Recording	1080p HD video recording at 25 fps, 30 fps, or 60 fps								1080p HD video recording at 30 fps, or 60 fps	
Front Camera	Extended Dynamic Range Video	30 fps								No	
Front Camera	HDR for photos	Smart HDR 4						Smart HDR 3		Smart HDR	
Front Camera	Cinematic video stabilization	1080p and 720p								No	
Front Camera	Auto Image Stabilization	Yes									
Front Camera	FaceTime	Yes									
Audio	Playback	Four loudspeakers with two loudspeakers on top and two loudspeakers on bottom in portrait orientation adjusting sound to device orientation									
Audio	Dolby Atmos	Built-in speakers and headphones with Spatial Audio									
Audio	3.5 mm Jack	No									
Audio	Microphone	Four studio-quality microphones				Five studio-quality microphones					
Materials	Front	All models have black glass front									
Materials	Back	Flat aluminum back and bezel Wi-Fi + Cellular models also have a long, thin line of plastic for the cellular antenna on bottom. The color of the plastic is dependent on the device.									
Colors											
Power		3.83 V 31.29 W·h (8,160 mA·h)	3.82 V 38.99 W·h (10,209 mA·h)	3.83 V 31.29 W·h (8,160 mA·h)	3.82 V 38.99 W·h (10,209 mA·h)	3.77 V 28.65 W·h (7,540 mA·h)	3.82 V 40.88 W·h (10,566 mA·h)	3.77 V 28.65 W·h (7,540 mA·h)	3.82 V 40.88 W·h (10,566 mA·h)	3.77 V 28.65 W·h (7,540 mA·h)	3.76 V 36.71 W·h (9,720 mA·h)
Included Charger		20 W (9 V 2.22 A) USB-C; Charger is not included in the European Union and United Kingdom				20 W (9 V 2.22 A) USB-C				18 W (9 V 2 A) USB-C	
Dimensions	Height	249.7 mm (9.83 in)	281.6 mm (11.09 in)	249.7 mm (9.83 in)	281.6 mm (11.09 in)	247.6 mm (9.75 in)	280.6 mm (11.05 in)	247.6 mm (9.75 in)	280.6 mm (11.05 in)	247.6 mm (9.75 in)	280.6 mm (11.05 in)
Dimensions	Width	177.5 mm (6.99 in)	215.5 mm (8.48 in)	177.5 mm (6.99 in)	215.5 mm (8.48 in)	178.5 mm (7.03 in)	214.9 mm (8.46 in)	178.5 mm (7.03 in)	214.9 mm (8.46 in)	178.5 mm (7.03 in)	214.9 mm (8.46 in)
Dimensions	Depth	5.3 mm (0.21 in)	5.1 mm (0.20 in)	5.3 mm (0.21 in)	5.1 mm (0.20 in)	5.9 mm (0.23 in)	6.4 mm (0.25 in)	5.9 mm (0.23 in)	6.4 mm (0.25 in)	5.9 mm (0.23 in)	
Weight	Wi-Fi	444 g (0.98 lb)	579 g (1.28 lb)	444 g (0.98 lb)	579 g (1.28 lb)	466 g (1.03 lb)	682 g (1.50 lb)	466 g (1.03 lb)	682 g (1.50 lb)	471 g (1.04 lb)	641 g (1.41 lb)
Weight	Wi-Fi + Cellular	446 g (0.98 lb)	582 g (1.28 lb)	446 g (0.98 lb)	582 g (1.28 lb)	470 g (1.04 lb)	685 g (1.51 lb)	468 g (1.03 lb)	684 g (1.51 lb)	473 g (1.04 lb)	643 g (1.42 lb)
Total greenhouse gas emissions		103 kg CO_{2}e	120 kg CO_{2}e	93 kg CO_{2}e	107 kg CO_{2}e	100 kg CO_{2}e	135 kg CO_{2}e	99 kg CO_{2}e	138 kg CO_{2}e	119 kg CO_{2}e	140 kg CO_{2}e
Hardware strings		iPad17,1 iPad17,2	iPad17,3 iPad17,4	iPad16,3 iPad16,4	iPad16,5 iPad16,6	iPad14,3 iPad14,4	iPad14,5 iPad14,6	iPad13,4 iPad13,5 iPad13,6 iPad13,7	iPad13,8 iPad13,9 iPad13,10 iPad13,11	iPad8,9 iPad8,10	iPad8,11 iPad8,12
Model number		A3357; A3358; A3359	A3360; A3361; A3362	A2836; A2837; A3006	A2925; A2926; A3007	A2435; A2759; A2761; A2762	A2436; A2437; A2764; A2766	A2301; A2377; A2459; A2460	A2378; A2379; A2461; A2462	A2068; A2228; A2230; A2231	A2069; A2229; A2232; A2233
Announced Date		October 15, 2025		May 7, 2024		October 18, 2022		April 20, 2021		March 18, 2020	
Released Date		October 22, 2025		May 15, 2024		October 26, 2022		May 21, 2021		March 25, 2020	
Discontinued Date		In production		October 15, 2025		May 7, 2024		October 18, 2022		April 20, 2021	
Unsupported Date		Supported									

==== Unsupported ====
Model		iPad Pro 11-in. (1st generation)	iPad Pro 12.9-in. (3rd generation)	iPad Pro 10.5-in.	iPad Pro 12.9-in. (2nd generation)	iPad Pro 9.7-in.	iPad Pro 12.9-in. (1st generation)
Picture							
Initial release operating system		iOS 12.1		iOS 10.3		iOS 9.3	iOS 9.1
Latest release operating system		iPadOS 26.7.3		iPadOS 17.7.11		iPadOS 16.7.16	
Display	Screen size	11 in (280 mm) (diagonal)	12.9 in (330 mm) (diagonal)	10.5 in (270 mm) (diagonal)	12.9 in (330 mm) (diagonal)	9.7 in (250 mm) (diagonal)	12.9 in (330 mm) (diagonal)
Display	Backlight	LED-backlit					
Display	Multi-touch	Yes					
Display	Technology	Liquid Retina display with IPS technology		Retina display with IPS technology			
Display	Resolution	2388 x 1668	2732 x 2048	2224 x 1668	2732 x 2048	2048 x 1536	2732 x 2048
Display	Pixel Density (ppi)	264					
Display	Aspect Ratio	~10:7	4:3				
Display	Typical Max brightness ( cd/m^{2})	600				500	400
Display	XDR Max brightness ( cd/m^{2})	—N/a					
Display	Fingerprint-resistant oleophobic coating	Yes					
Display	Laminated Display	Yes					
Display	Anti-reflective coating	Yes					
Display	Reflectance	1.8 %					
Display	Full sRGB Display	Yes					
Display	Wide Color Display (Display P3)	Yes					No
Display	True Tone Display	Yes					No
Display	Night Shift	Yes					
Display	ProMotion Display	From 24Hz to 120Hz				No	
Display	HDR10 Content	Yes				No	
Display	Dolby Vision	Yes				No	
Display	Apple Pencil hover	No					
Processor	Chip	Apple A12X Bionic		Apple A10X Fusion		Apple A9X	
Processor	Technology Node	7 nm (N7)		10 nm		16 nm	
Processor	Total Cores	8		6		2	
Processor	High-Performance Cores	4 × Vortex		3 × Hurricane		2 × Twister	
Processor	Energy-Efficiency Cores	4 × Tempest		3 × Zephyr		—N/a	
Processor	Clock Speed	2.49 GHz, 1.59 GHz		2.38 GHz, 1.30 GHz		2.16 GHz	2.26 GHz
Processor	Bit	64-bit					
Processor	Motion Coprocessor	Embedded in SoC					
Processor	Bus width	128-bit				64-bit (Due to only one RAM module)	128-bit
Processor	Graphics Processor	Second generation Apple designed 7-core GPU		PowerVR 7XT Series 7600 Plus (12-core)		PowerVR 7XT Series 7800 (12-core)	
Processor	Media Engine	—N/a					
Processor	Neural Engine	8-core Neural Engine (5 TOPS)		—N/a			
Storage		64 GB, 256 GB, 512 GB, 1 TB		64 GB, 256 GB, 512 GB		32 GB, 128 GB, 256 GB	
Storage Type		NAND Flash driven by NVMe-based controller that communicates over a PCIe connection					
RAM		4 GB (Models with 64 GB, 256 GB or 512 GB storage); 6 GB (Models with 1 TB storage)		4 GB		2 GB	4 GB
RAM Type		LPDDR4X 2133 MHz (68.2 GB/s)		LPDDR4 1600 MHz (51.2 GB/s)		LPDDR4 1600 MHz (25.6 GB/s)	LPDDR4 1600 MHz (51.2 GB/s)
Virtual Memory Swap		No					
Connector	Main Connector	USB-C port supporting charging and DisplayPort protocols among others		8-pin Lightning connector port supporting charging			
Connector	Side Connector	Back Smart Connector for Smart Keyboard Folio and Magic Keyboard; Magnetic connector (For 2nd generation Apple Pencil)		Side Smart Connector for Smart Keyboard			
Connector	Transmission Speed	Up to 10 Gbit/s transmission speeds (USB 3.1 Gen 2)		Up to 5 Gbit/s transmission speeds (USB 3.0)		Up to 0.48 Gbit/s transmission speeds (USB 2.0)	Up to 5 Gbit/s transmission speeds (USB 3.0)
Connector	External Display Support	One display up to 5K resolution at 60 Hz		No			
Apple Pencil Support		Apple Pencil (2nd generation); Apple Pencil (USB-C)		Apple Pencil (1st generation)			
Keyboard Support	Bluetooth Keyboard	Yes					
Keyboard Support	Smart Keyboard	No		Yes			
Keyboard Support	Smart Keyboard Folio	Yes		No			
Keyboard Support	Magic Keyboard	Yes		No			
Keyboard Support	Magic Keyboard Folio	No					
Connectivity	Wi-Fi (802.11)	Wi-Fi 5 (802.11a/b/g/n/ac)					
Connectivity	MIMO	Yes					
Connectivity	Simultaneous Dual Band	Yes		No			
Connectivity	Maximum Wi-Fi Speed	0.866 Gbit/s					
Connectivity	Bluetooth	Bluetooth 5.0		Bluetooth 4.2			
Connectivity	Cellular (Cellular models only)	GSM/EDGE/UMTS/HSPA+/DC-HSDPA/Gigabit-class LTE up to 29 bands		GSM/EDGE/UMTS/HSPA+/DC-HSDPA/CDMA EV-DO Rev. A and Rev. B/LTE-Advanced up to 25 bands CDMA EV-DO Rev. A and Rev. B is available in some models		GSM/EDGE/UMTS/HSPA+/DC-HSDPA/CDMA EV-DO Rev. A and Rev. B/LTE-Advanced up to 23 bands CDMA EV-DO Rev. A and Rev. B is available in some models	GSM/EDGE/UMTS/HSPA+/DC-HSDPA/CDMA EV-DO Rev. A and Rev. B/LTE-Advanced up to 20 bands CDMA EV-DO Rev. A and Rev. B is available in some models
Connectivity	Assisted GPS (Cellular models only)	Yes					
Connectivity	GLONASS/GNSS (Cellular models only)	Yes					
Connectivity	SIM card form-factor (Cellular models only)	Nano-SIM					
Connectivity	SIM card form-factor (Cellular models only)	eSIM		Embedded Apple SIM		—N/a	
Secure Authentication	Touch ID	No		Second generation sensor in Home Button			
Secure Authentication	Face ID	Yes		No			
Sensors	LiDAR sensor	No					
Sensors	Three-axis gyro	Yes					
Sensors	Accelerometer	Yes					
Sensors	Ambient Light Sensor	Yes					
Sensors	Barometer	Yes					
Rear Camera	Camera	12 MP Wide					8 MP Wide
Rear Camera	Aperture	f/1.8				f/2.2	f/2.4
Rear Camera	Optical Image Stabilization	No		Yes		No	
Rear Camera	Auto Image Stabilization	Yes					
Rear Camera	Element Lens	Five-element lens		Six-element lens		Five-element lens	
Rear Camera	Optical Zoom	1x					
Rear Camera	Digital Zoom	5x zoom in					
Rear Camera	Autofocus	With Focus Pixels					Yes
Rear Camera	Panorama	Up to 63 MP					Up to 43 MP
Rear Camera	Lens Cover	Sapphire crystal lens cover					—N/a
Rear Camera	Burst Mode	Yes					
Rear Camera	Flash	Quad-LED True Tone flash				True Tone flash	—N/a
Rear Camera	Live Photos	Yes					No
Rear Camera	Wide Color Capture	Yes					No
Rear Camera	HDR for photos	Smart HDR		Auto HDR			Yes
Rear Camera	Video Recording	4K at 30 fps or 60 fps 1080p HD at 30 fps or 60 fps		4K at 30 fps 1080p HD at 30 fps or 60 fps			1080p HD at 30 fps
Rear Camera	ProRes Video	No					
Rear Camera	Extended Dynamic Range Video	No					
Rear Camera	Optical Image Stabilization for Video	No		Yes		No	
Rear Camera	Optical Video Zoom	1x					
Rear Camera	Digital Video Zoom	3x zoom in					
Rear Camera	Slow-motion video	1080p at 240 fps		1080p at 120 fps 720p at 240 fps			720p at 120 fps
Rear Camera	Audio Zoom	Yes		No			
Rear Camera	Time-lapse video with stabilization	Yes					
Rear Camera	Cinematic video stabilization	Yes					No
Rear Camera	Stereo Recording	Yes		No			
Front Camera	Camera	7 MP TrueDepth		7 MP FaceTime HD		5 MP FaceTime HD	1.2 MP FaceTime HD
Front Camera	Aperture	f/2.2					
Front Camera	Center Stage	No					
Front Camera	Portrait Mode	With advanced bokeh and Depth Control		No			
Front Camera	Portrait Lighting	With six effects (Natural, Studio, Contour, Stage, Stage Mono, High‑Key Mono)		No			
Front Camera	Animoji and Memoji	Yes		No			
Front Camera	Live Photos	Yes					No
Front Camera	Wide color capture	Yes					No
Front Camera	Retina Flash	Yes					No
Front Camera	Video Recording	1080p HD video recording at 30 fps, or 60 fps		1080p HD video recording at 30 fps		720p HD video recording at 30 fps	
Front Camera	ProRes Video	No					
Front Camera	Extended Dynamic Range Video	No					
Front Camera	HDR for photos	Smart HDR		Auto HDR			Yes
Front Camera	Cinematic video stabilization	No					
Front Camera	Auto Image Stabilization	Yes				No	
Front Camera	FaceTime	Yes					
Audio	Playback	Four loudspeakers with two loudspeakers on top and two loudspeakers on bottom in portrait orientation adjusting sound to device orientation					
Audio	Dolby Atmos	Built-in speakers and headphones with Spatial Audio		No			
Audio	3.5 mm Jack	No		Yes			
Audio	Microphones	Five microphones		Two microphones			
Materials	Front	All models have black glass front		Silver, Gold and Rose Gold: White glass front Space Gray: Black glass front	Silver and Gold: White glass front Space Gray: Black glass front		
Materials	Back	Flat aluminum back and bezel Wi-Fi + Cellular models also have a long, thin line of plastic for the cellular antenna on bottom. The color of the plastic is dependent on the device.		Contoured aluminum back and bezel Wi-Fi + Cellular models also have a long, thin line of plastic for the cellular antenna on top. The color of the plastic is dependent on the device.			Contoured aluminum back and bezel Wi-Fi + Cellular models also have a piece of plastic for the cellular antenna on top. The color of the plastic is dependent on the device.
Colors							
Power		3.77 V 29.37 W·h (7,812 mA·h)	3.76 V 36.71 W·h (9,720 mA·h)	3.77 V 30.8 W·h (8,134 mA·h)	3.77 V 41.4 W·h (10,994 mA·h)	3.82 V 29.71 W·h (7,306 mA·h)	3.77 V 38.8 W·h (10,307 mA·h)
Included Charger		18 W (9 V 2 A) USB-C		12 W (5 V 2.4 A) or 10 W (5 V 2 A) USB-A			
Dimensions	Height	247.6 mm (9.75 in)	280.6 mm (11.05 in)	250.6 mm (9.87 in)	305.7 mm (12.04 in)	240 mm (9.4 in)	305.7 mm (12.04 in)
Dimensions	Width	178.5 mm (7.03 in)	214.9 mm (8.46 in)	174.1 mm (6.85 in)	220.6 mm (8.69 in)	169.5 mm (6.67 in)	220.6 mm (8.69 in)
Dimensions	Depth	5.9 mm (0.23 in)		6.1 mm (0.24 in)	6.9 mm (0.27 in)	6.1 mm (0.24 in)	6.9 mm (0.27 in)
Weight	Wi-Fi	468 g (1.03 lb)	631 g (1.39 lb)	469 g (1.03 lb)	677 g (1.49 lb)	437 g (0.96 lb)	713 g (1.57 lb)
Weight	Wi-Fi + Cellular	468 g (1.03 lb)	633 g (1.40 lb)	477 g (1.05 lb)	692 g (1.53 lb)	444 g (0.98 lb)	723 g (1.59 lb)
Total greenhouse gas emissions		113 kg CO_{2}e	136 kg CO_{2}e	100 kg CO_{2}e	122 kg CO_{2}e	210 kg CO_{2}e	270 kg CO_{2}e
Hardware strings		iPad8,1 iPad8,2 iPad8,3 iPad8,4	iPad8,5 iPad8,6 iPad8,7 iPad8,8	iPad7,3 iPad7,4	iPad7,1 iPad7,2	iPad6,3 iPad6,4	iPad6,7 iPad6,8
Model number		A1980; A2013; A1934; A1979	A1876; A2014; A1895; A1983	A1701; A1709	A1670; A1671	A1673; A1674; A1675	A1584; A1652
Announced Date		October 30, 2018		June 5, 2017		March 21, 2016	September 9, 2015
Released Date		November 7, 2018		June 13, 2017		March 31, 2016	32 and 128 GB: November 11, 2015; 256 GB: March 31, 2016
Discontinued Date		March 18, 2020		March 18, 2019	October 30, 2018	June 5, 2017	
Unsupported Date		Bug fixes, security updates only		May 11, 2026			

== Operating system support ==
Supported iOS and iPadOS versions on the iPad
Model	iOS (Note: The OS was called "iPhone OS" for version 3.2.x only.)										iPadOS							
Model	3	4	5	6	7	8	9	10	11	12	13	14	15	16 (Note: iPadOS 16.0 was only available as a Beta, with version 16.1 being the first stable version.)	17	18	26	27
iPad (1st)	3.2	Supported	Supported	Unsupported	Unsupported	Unsupported	Unsupported	Unsupported	Unsupported	Unsupported	Unsupported	Unsupported	Unsupported	Unsupported	Unsupported	Unsupported	Unsupported	Unsupported
iPad 2	—N/a	4.3	Supported	Supported	Supported	Supported	Supported	Unsupported	Unsupported	Unsupported	Unsupported	Unsupported	Unsupported	Unsupported	Unsupported	Unsupported	Unsupported	Unsupported
iPad (3rd)	—N/a		5.1	Supported	Supported	Supported	Supported	Unsupported	Unsupported	Unsupported	Unsupported	Unsupported	Unsupported	Unsupported	Unsupported	Unsupported	Unsupported	Unsupported
iPad (4th)	—N/a			Supported	Supported	Supported	Supported	Supported	Unsupported	Unsupported	Unsupported	Unsupported	Unsupported	Unsupported	Unsupported	Unsupported	Unsupported	Unsupported
iPad (5th)	—N/a							10.2.1	Supported	Supported	Supported	Supported	Supported	Supported	Unsupported	Unsupported	Unsupported	Unsupported
iPad (6th)	—N/a								11.3	Supported	Supported	Supported	Supported	Supported	Supported	Unsupported	Unsupported	Unsupported
iPad (7th)	—N/a										13.1	Supported	Supported	Supported	Supported	Supported	Unsupported	Unsupported
iPad (8th)	—N/a											Supported	Supported	Supported	Supported	Supported	Supported	Unsupported
iPad (9th)	—N/a												Supported	Supported	Supported	Supported	Supported	Supported
iPad (10th)	—N/a													16.1	Supported	Supported	Supported	Supported
iPad (11th)	—N/a															18.3.1	Supported	Supported

Supported iOS and iPadOS versions on the iPad Mini
Model	iOS							iPadOS							
Model	6	7	8	9	10	11	12	13	14	15	16	17	18	26	27
Mini (1st)	6.0.1	Supported	Supported	Supported	Unsupported	Unsupported	Unsupported	Unsupported	Unsupported	Unsupported	Unsupported	Unsupported	Unsupported	Unsupported	Unsupported
Mini 2	—N/a	7.0.3	Supported	Supported	Supported	Supported	Supported	Unsupported	Unsupported	Unsupported	Unsupported	Unsupported	Unsupported	Unsupported	Unsupported
Mini 3	—N/a		8.1	Supported	Supported	Supported	Supported	Unsupported	Unsupported	Unsupported	Unsupported	Unsupported	Unsupported	Unsupported	Unsupported
Mini 4	—N/a			Supported	Supported	Supported	Supported	Supported	Supported	Supported	Unsupported	Unsupported	Unsupported	Unsupported	Unsupported
Mini (5th)	—N/a						12.2	Supported	Supported	Supported	Supported	Supported	Supported	Supported	Unsupported
Mini (6th)	—N/a									Supported	Supported	Supported	Supported	Supported	Supported
Mini (7th)	—N/a												Supported	Supported	Supported
Mini (8th)	—N/a														27.2

Supported iOS and iPadOS versions on the iPad Air
Model	iOS						iPadOS							
Model	7	8	9	10	11	12	13	14	15	16	17	18	26	27
Air (1st)	7.0.3	Supported	Supported	Supported	Supported	Supported	Unsupported	Unsupported	Unsupported	Unsupported	Unsupported	Unsupported	Unsupported	Unsupported
Air 2	—N/a	8.1	Supported	Supported	Supported	Supported	Supported	Supported	Supported	Unsupported	Unsupported	Unsupported	Unsupported	Unsupported
Air (3rd)	—N/a					12.2	Supported	Supported	Supported	Supported	Supported	Supported	Supported	Unsupported
Air (4th)	—N/a							14.1	Supported	Supported	Supported	Supported	Supported	Supported
Air (5th)	—N/a								15.4	Supported	Supported	Supported	Supported	Supported
Air (6th)	—N/a										17.4	Supported	Supported	Supported
Air (7th)	—N/a											18.3.1	Supported	Supported
Air (8th)	—N/a												26.3	Supported

Supported iOS and iPadOS versions on the iPad Pro
Model	iOS				iPadOS							
Model	9	10	11	12	13	14	15	16	17	18	26	27
Pro (1st)	9.1 / 9.3 (Note: iOS 9.1 on iPad Pro 12.9" (2015). iOS 9.3 on iPad Pro 9.7" (2016).)	Supported	Supported	Supported	Supported	Supported	Supported	Supported	Unsupported	Unsupported	Unsupported	Unsupported
Pro (2nd)	—N/a	10.3.2	Supported	Supported	Supported	Supported	Supported	Supported	Supported	Unsupported	Unsupported	Unsupported
Pro (3rd)	—N/a			12.1	Supported	Supported	Supported	Supported	Supported	Supported	Supported	Unsupported
Pro (4th)	—N/a				13.4	Supported	Supported	Supported	Supported	Supported	Supported	Supported
Pro (5th)	—N/a					14.5	Supported	Supported	Supported	Supported	Supported	Supported
Pro (6th)	—N/a							16.1	Supported	Supported	Supported	Supported
Pro (7th)	—N/a								17.4	Supported	Supported	Supported
Pro (8th)	—N/a										Supported	Supported

== iPad systems-on-chips ==
System-on-chip	RAM	RAM type	Storage type	Model	Highest Supported iPadOS
M5	16 GB	LPDDR5X 4800 MHz	PCIe-Based SSD	iPad Pro (M5)	Latest iPadOS iPadOS 27.2.1
M5	12 GB	LPDDR5X 4800 MHz	PCIe-Based SSD	iPad Pro (M5)	Latest iPadOS iPadOS 27.2.1
M4	16 GB	LPDDR5X 3750 MHz	PCIe-Based SSD	iPad Pro (M4)	Latest iPadOS iPadOS 27.2.1
M4	8 GB	LPDDR5X 3750 MHz	PCIe-Based SSD	iPad Pro (M4)	Latest iPadOS iPadOS 27.2.1
M4	12 GB	LPDDR5X 3750 MHz	PCIe-Based SSD	iPad Air (M4)	Latest iPadOS iPadOS 27.2.1
M3	8 GB	LPDDR5 3200 MHz	PCIe-Based SSD	iPad Air (M3)	Latest iPadOS iPadOS 27.2.1
M2	16 GB	LPDDR5 3200 MHz	PCIe-Based SSD	iPad Pro 11-inch (4th) iPad Pro 12.9-inch (6th)	Latest iPadOS iPadOS 27.2.1
M2	8 GB	LPDDR5 3200 MHz	PCIe-Based SSD	iPad Pro 11-inch (4th) iPad Pro 12.9-inch (6th)	Latest iPadOS iPadOS 27.2.1
M2	8 GB	LPDDR5 3200 MHz	PCIe-Based SSD	iPad Air (M2)	Latest iPadOS iPadOS 27.2.1
M1	16 GB	LPDDR4X 2133 MHz	PCIe-Based SSD	iPad Pro 11-inch (3rd) iPad Pro 12.9-inch (5th)	Latest iPadOS iPadOS 27.2.1
M1	8 GB	LPDDR4X 2133 MHz	PCIe-Based SSD	iPad Pro 11-inch (3rd) iPad Pro 12.9-inch (5th)	Latest iPadOS iPadOS 27.2.1
M1	8 GB	LPDDR4X 2133 MHz	PCIe-Based SSD	iPad Air (5th)	Latest iPadOS iPadOS 27.2.1
A20 Pro	12 GB	LPDDR5X 4800 MHz	NVMe NAND	iPad mini (A20 Pro)	Latest iPadOS iPadOS 27.2.1
A17 Pro	8 GB	LPDDR5 3200 MHz	NVMe NAND	iPad mini (A17 Pro)	Latest iPadOS iPadOS 27.2.1
A16	6 GB	LPDDR5 3200 MHz	NVMe NAND	iPad (A16)	Latest iPadOS iPadOS 27.2.1
A15 Bionic	4 GB	LPDDR4X 2133 MHz	NVMe NAND	iPad mini (6th)	Latest iPadOS iPadOS 27.2.1
A14 Bionic	4 GB	LPDDR4X 2133 MHz	NVMe NAND	iPad (10th) iPad Air (4th)	Latest iPadOS iPadOS 27.2.1
A13 Bionic	3 GB	LPDDR4X 2133 MHz	NVMe NAND	iPad (9th)	Latest iPadOS iPadOS 27.2.1
A12Z Bionic	6 GB	LPDDR4X 2133 MHz	NVMe NAND	iPad Pro 11-inch (2nd) iPad Pro 12.9-inch (4th)	Latest iPadOS iPadOS 27.2.1
A12X Bionic	6 GB	LPDDR4X 2133 MHz	NVMe NAND	iPad Pro 11-inch (1st) iPad Pro 12.9-inch (3rd)	iPadOS 26.7.3
A12X Bionic	4 GB	LPDDR4X 2133 MHz	NVMe NAND	iPad Pro 11-inch (1st) iPad Pro 12.9-inch (3rd)	iPadOS 26.7.3
A12 Bionic	3 GB	LPDDR4X 2133 MHz	NVMe NAND	iPad (8th) iPad mini (5th) iPad Air (3rd)	iPadOS 26.7.3
A10X Fusion	4 GB	LPDDR4 1600 MHz	NVMe NAND	iPad Pro 10.5-inch iPad Pro 12.9-inch (2nd)	iPadOS 17.7.11
A10 Fusion	3 GB	LPDDR4 1600 MHz	NVMe NAND	iPad (7th)	iPadOS 18.7.12
A10 Fusion	2 GB	LPDDR4 1600 MHz	NVMe NAND	iPad (6th)	iPadOS 17.7.11
A9X	4 GB	LPDDR4 1600 MHz	NVMe NAND	iPad Pro 12.9-inch (1st)	iPadOS 16.7.16
A9X	2 GB	LPDDR4 1600 MHz	NVMe NAND	iPad Pro 9.7-inch	iPadOS 16.7.16
A9	2 GB	LPDDR4 1600 MHz	NVMe NAND	iPad (5th)	iPadOS 16.7.16
A8X	2 GB	LPDDR3 800 MHz	eMMC	iPad Air 2	iPadOS 15.8.8
A8	2 GB	LPDDR3 800 MHz	eMMC	iPad mini 4	iPadOS 15.8.8
A7	1 GB	LPDDR3 800 MHz	eMMC	iPad mini 3 iPad mini 2 iPad Air (1st)	iOS 12.5.8
A6X	1 GB	LPDDR2 533 MHz	eMMC	iPad (4th)	iOS 10.3.4 (Wi-Fi + Cellular) iOS 10.3.3 (Wi-Fi)
A5X	1 GB	LPDDR2 400 MHz	eMMC	iPad (3rd)	iOS 9.3.6 (Wi-Fi + Cellular) iOS 9.3.5 (Wi-Fi)
A5	512 MB	LPDDR2 400 MHz	eMMC	iPad 2 iPad mini (1st)	iOS 9.3.6 (Wi-Fi + Cellular) iOS 9.3.5 (Wi-Fi)
A4	256 MB	LPDDR 200 MHz	eMMC	iPad (1st)	iOS 5.1.1

== See also ==
- iPadOS version history
- List of iPhone models
