= TRASNA Solutions =

- Company type: Private
- Industry: Technology, telecommunications, IoT
- Founded: 2018
- Founder: Stéphane Fund
- Headquarters: Ireland
- Number of locations: Ireland, France, Dubai, Tunisia, India
- Area served: Worldwide
- Key people: Stéphane Fund (CEO)
- Products: System on Chip (SoC), embedded modules, SIM cards, eSIM cloud platform, eSIM IoT remote manager
- Services: IoT technologies, Cloud eSIM technology
- Number of employees: 400+
- Website: www.trasna.io

TRASNA Solutions is a global company specializing in semiconductor, SIM, eSIM, SoC, and iSIM for the Internet of Things (IoT) and mobile-connected devices.

== History ==
TRASNA Solutions was founded in 2018 by Stéphane Fund after selling his previous company, Simulity Labs, to ARM Holdings in 2017. Fund created a company to address challenges in the IoT sector, such as high costs, slow implementations, and a fragmented vendor landscape faced by device makers and network operators. In the same year, Trasna acquired Elatec (Germany) and SAFE-IoT (France), providing the company with important hardware and software expertise. These acquisitions helped Trasna expand its offerings in secure microcontrollers, IoT technologies, and eSIM technologies.

In 2023, TRASNA Solutions produced its first SIM chip and developed its own RISC-V processor. The company also deployed over 40 secure microcontrollers for use in products like smart cards, point-of-sale terminals, smart meters, and security devices.

In February 2024, TRASNA Solutions acquired Workz, a company specializing in cloud eSIM technology. In November, TRASNA Solutions opened a semiconductor-focused research, development and manufacturing facility in Kerala, India. In December, the company acquired IoTerop, a company specializing in device management, to improve its IoT services.

On March 17, 2025, TRASNA Solutions acquired u-blox's cellular IoT module business, including technology, intellectual property, and staff for an undisclosed sum.

== Overview ==
TRASNA Solutions develops system on a chip products, embedded modules, SIM cards, cloud SIM platform and an IoT eSIM remote manager. In 2023, the company began developing its System on Chip (SoC) with an integrated iSIM module, which is expected to influence the IoT market.
