= Workz =

Emirati technology company

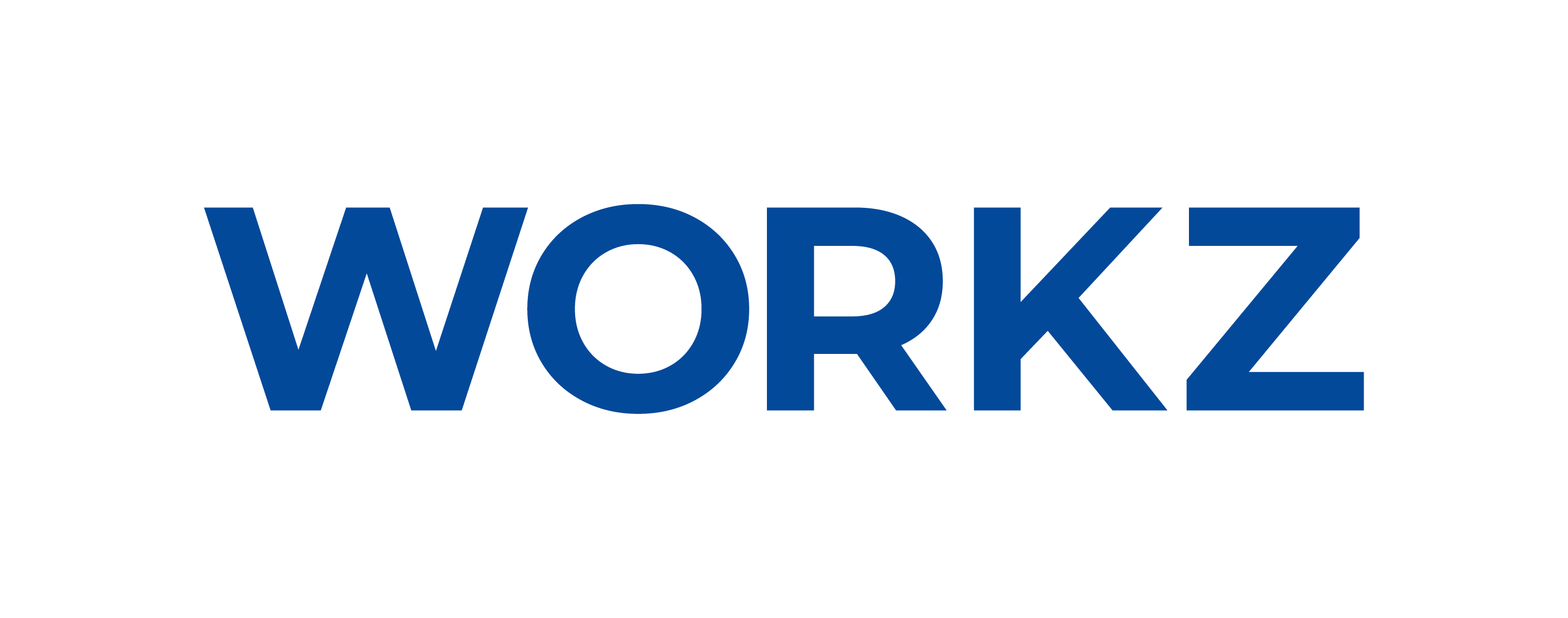
- Company type: Multinational company
- Founded: 1997
- Founder: Brad Taylor and Tor Malmros
- Headquarters: Dubai, UAE
- Website: Official site

Workz is a technology company specialized in eSIM and cloud-based services. The company is headquartered in Dubai, UAE, and operates worldwide.

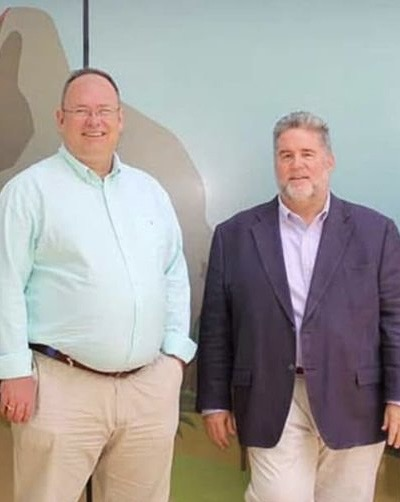
Workz Co-founders - Tor Malmros and Brad Taylor

== History ==
Workz was founded in 1997, initially focused on SIM card production, personalization, and fulfilment. In July 2014, Workz opened a Dubai scratch card printing facility.

In June 2015, Workz joined the GSM Association (GSMA), becoming a member of the global mobile communications industry body.

In April 2016, Vodafone Qatar awarded Workz as the ‘Best Experience Support Partner’ during their 2016 CXO Awards ceremony.

In January 2017, the company released its Over-The-Air (OTA) platform called Z-OTA. In June, Workz was ranked as the number one scratch card manufacturer in the world by the Nilson Report, shipping one billion prepaid phone cards.

In 2018, Workz opened its regional sales office in Johannesburg, South Africa. In August 2018, the company became the largest manufacturer of SIM with eUICC software production in the Middle East and Africa to be certified by the GSMA. In October 2018, Workz collaborated with Truphone to launch a remote SIM. In November, Workz together with Arm offered full eUICC manufacturing and remote SIM based on the Arm technology. In December, the company signed a partnership with MTX Connect, the Luxembourg-based mobile virtual network operator to launch virtual SIMs.

In 2019, Workz launched its first 5G SIM card. By September, it became the first in the Middle East and Africa to be certified by the GSMA for embedded SIM technology. In November, in collaboration with Econet Global, the companies provided network connectivity via embedded SIM devices.

In February 2020, Workz introduced its own IoT platform for SIM-based devices. In May 2020, Workz joined the Trusted Connectivity Alliance (TCA) formerly known as SIMalliance.

In August 2021, Workz received the certification under the GSMA's Security Accreditation Scheme (SAS) and integrated with Microsoft Azure’s Paris site. In September 2021, Workz launched Multi-eSIM Hub (MeSH), a multi-tenant eSIM management platform. In November 2021, Workz introduced a new biodegradable SIM card which product was adopted by Virgin Mobile MEA in 2022 across all its operated regions.

In 2022, Workz partnered with Monogoto, a global connectivity provider, to establish a cloud platform.

In April 2023, Workz partnered with 1oT, an IoT connectivity provider.

The company is accredited by the GSMA to manage the complete eSIM lifecycle across both the consumer and M2M markets.

In September 2024, Workz was acquired by Ireland’s Trasna Holdings to improve its services in mobile IoT technologies like SIM, eSIM, and SoC technology.
