= Remote SIM provisioning =

Specification to obtain and activate eSIM

Remote SIM provisioning is a GSMA specification that allows consumers to remotely activate the subscriber identity module (SIM) embedded in a portable device such as a smartphone, smart watch, fitness band or tablet computer. It is one part of the GSMA's work on eSIM. Another part of that work splits the SIM into separate "domains", so the operator's profile is kept apart from security and applications. eSIM can also be added to older phones using a special physical SIM card that works with Android 9's eSIM features, It can also be built directly into a phone's main chip (SoC). GSMA certification requires the profile data to be decrypted only inside the chip, so the secret network keys (such as Ki, OPc and 5G keys) cannot be copied out.

== Background to the specification ==
Several trends led to the specification:

- SIMs that cannot be removed, such as MFF chips, which are soldered into the device.
- Mobile operators' support for "always best connected" (ABC), the idea that a device should be able to get a good connection from any operator at any time.
- The fast growth of Internet of Things (IoT) devices. Gartner estimated that 8.4 billion connected devices were in use in 2017, up 31% from 2016.
- The cost and effort of changing the SIM in a device that is already in use.

== Origin ==
The Consumer Remote SIM Provisioning initiative was started by the GSM Association (GSMA), a trade group of mobile operators and related companies. It was announced in mid-2014, and the full specification was published in February 2016. At first, the specification was meant only for M2M devices. From December 2015, it began to be used in consumer wearables and in business uses such as authentication and identity management.

"This new specification gives consumers the freedom to remotely connect devices, such as wearables, to a mobile network of their choice and continues to evolve the process of connecting new and innovative devices," said Alex Sinclair, the GSMA's chief technology officer.

The specification also lets independent service providers send profile-loading commands to the SIM, and lets profiles be stored in certified data centers called subscription managers.

== Purpose ==
The consumer part of the specification lets users choose a mobile network operator and activate the SIM built into their device. It also lets several devices share one subscription. The GSMA also hoped it would encourage mobile device makers to build more connected wearables. The specification that covers carrier selection for M2M devices is simpler because there is usually no user involved, for example when changing the operator of an electricity meter.

The name "eSIM" can be confusing. It describes what the SIM can do, not its physical size (its "form factor"). eSIMs come in many sizes, including 2FF, 3FF, 4FF and MFF.

GSMA has also developed a compliance framework for eSIM devices, eUICCs and subscription management products, to make sure they work together and are secure. It is published as SGP.24. It sets requirements for:

- Functional interoperability
- eUICC security
- eUICC production site security
- Subscription Management site security

== Operation ==
On consumer devices, provisioning is started by the Local Profile Assistant (LPA). This is software on the device that follows the GSMA's consumer specifications, SGP.21 and SGP.22.

When the LPA wants to retrieve a carrier profile, it contacts a subscription manager (SM) service on the internet via HTTPS. The device can get the SM's address in several ways:

- in a QR code scanned by the user
- by manually entering the SM's host name/activation code on screen
- hard-coded by the device maker in the firmware
- via a universal discovery service operated by the GSMA.

The LPA checks that the SM's X.509 certificate is valid and was issued by the GSMA certificate authority. It then sets up a secure connection between the eUICC and the SM, using challenge–response authentication. The LPA asks for the available carrier profiles by sending either the user's activation code or the eUICC's eSIM ID (EID). The SM sends the profile encrypted so that only the eUICC can decrypt and install it, which keeps the network key secret.

For IoT devices, remote SIM provisioning works a little differently and follows the GSMA's SGP.31 and SGP.32 specifications. Instead of an LPA, it uses an IoT Profile Assistant (IPA), which runs either in the eUICC (IPAe) or on the device (IPAd). Provisioning is controlled by the eSIM IoT Manager (eIM), software that sends commands to the IPA..
