= IPad Air (5th generation) =

2022 tablet computer by Apple

iPad Air (M1)

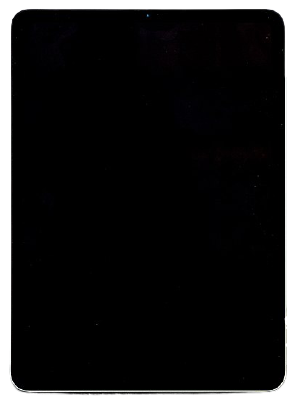
- Also known as: iPad Air 5 iPad Air (5th generation) iPad Air (10.9-inch) (2nd generation)
- Developer: Apple Inc.
- Manufacturer: Foxconn
- Product family: iPad Air
- Type: Tablet computer
- Generation: 5th
- Released: March 18, 2022; 4 years ago
- Introductory price: $599 USD £569 GBP €679 EUR $749 CAD $1,049 NZD ¥79,800 JPY
- Discontinued: May 7, 2024; 2 years ago
- Operating system: Original: iPadOS 15.4, released March 14, 2022; Current: iPadOS 27.2, released October 26, 2026
- System on a chip: Apple M1 with 64-bit architecture and embedded motion co-processor
- Memory: 8 GB (LPDDR4X SDRAM)
- Storage: 64 GB or 256 GB flash memory
- Display: 10.9 inches (280 mm) (2,360 × 1,640) px (264 ppi/24bit), 500-nits Max Brightness, Wide-Color Display (P3), True Tone Display, Fully Laminated Display, 1.8% Reflectivity and Apple Pencil (2nd generation) support
- Graphics: Apple-designed 8-core
- Sound: Stereo speakers
- Input: Multi-touch screen, headset controls, proximity and ambient light sensors, 3-axis accelerometer, 3-axis gyroscope, digital compass, dual microphone, Touch ID fingerprint reader, barometer
- Camera: Front: 12 MP, ƒ/2.4 aperture, burst mode, timer mode, exposure control, face detection, Smart HDR, wide-color capture, auto image stabilization, Retina flash, 1080p HD video recording, center stage Rear: 12 MP, ƒ/1.8 aperture, five-element lens, burst mode, timer mode, exposure control, noise reduction, face detection, Hybrid IR filter, Live Photos with stabilization, Autofocus with Focus Pixels, face detection, Smart HDR, panorama, wide-color capture, auto image stabilization, 2160p 4K 60fps video recording, video stabilization, slo-mo, time-lapse
- Connectivity: Wi-Fi and Wi-Fi + Cellular: 802.11 Wi-Fi 6 dual-band (2.4 GHz & 5 GHz) and MIMO Bluetooth 5.0 Wi-Fi + Cellular: GPS & GLONASS GSM UMTS / HSDPA 850, 1700, 1800, 1900 MHz LTE Multiple bands 1, 2, 3, 4, 5, 7, 8, 11, 12, 13, 14, 17, 18, 19, 20, 21, 25, 26, 29, 30, 34, 38, 39, 40, 41, 46, 48, 66, 71 5G NR Multiple bands n1, n2, n3, n5, n7, n8, n12, n20, n25, n28, n29, n30, n38, n40, n41, n48, n66, n71, n77, n78, n79
- Power: 28.6 watt-hour lithium-polymer battery
- Online services: App Store, iTunes Store, Books, iCloud, Game Center, Apple Arcade
- Dimensions: 9.74 inches (247.6 mm);(h) 7 inches (178.5 mm);(w) 0.24 inch (6.1 mm);(d)
- Weight: 1.02 lbs (461 g)
- Predecessor: iPad Air (4th generation)
- Successor: iPad Air (M2)
- Website: iPad Air - Apple at the Wayback Machine (archived May 5, 2024)

The fifth-generation iPad Air, colloquially known as the iPad Air 5 or iPad Air M1, is a tablet computer developed and marketed by Apple Inc. It was announced by Apple on March 8, 2022. Pre-orders began on March 11, 2022, and shipping began on March 18, 2022. It succeeded the fourth-generation iPad Air and is available in five colors: Space Gray, Starlight, Pink, Purple, and Blue.

The iPad Air (5th generation) was discontinued on May 7, 2024, following the announcement of its successor, the sixth-generation iPad Air.

== Features ==
=== Hardware ===
The fifth-generation iPad Air uses the Apple M1 SoC; the same chip used in the iPad Pro (5th generation). The chip has an 8-core CPU, an 8-core GPU and a 16-core Neural Engine which can process more than 11 trillion operations per second. Apple claims the CPU is up to 60 percent faster and the GPU has 2× faster graphics compared to its predecessor. It has 64 GB or 256 GB of internal storage, and 8 GB of RAM.

It has a 10.9-inch 2360-by-1640 Liquid Retina Display display with 3.8 million pixels. The display is laminated and has an anti-reflective coating, as well as featuring wide color, True Tone and 500 nits of brightness.

The fifth-generation iPad Air features a 12 MP rear camera and an ultra-wide 12 MP front camera with Center Stage, which automatically tracks users to keep them in frame. Both cameras have Smart HDR 3.

It has Touch ID integrated into the Sleep/Wake button on the top right edge of the device, and stereo speakers with dual-channel sound in landscape mode.

=== Connectivity ===
The fifth-generation iPad Air includes a USB-C port that is used for charging as well as connecting external devices and accessories. The port is capable of transferring up to 10 Gbit/s (ten billion bits per second, 1.25 GB/s or 1.25 billion bytes per second), allowing for fast connections to cameras and external storage, as well as support for monitors with up to 4K resolution. For wireless connection, the device comes with Bluetooth 5.0 and Wi-Fi 6 (802.11ax) support. Cellular models support sub-6 GHz 5G with peak speeds of up to 3.5 Gbit/s in ideal conditions.

== Timeline ==
Timeline of iPad models
See also: List of Apple products

Source: Apple Newsroom Archive.

Preceded by iPad Air (4th generation)	iPad Air (5th generation); 2022	Succeeded by iPad Air (6th generation)
