= IPad Air (M2) =

2024 tablet computer by Apple

iPad Air (M2)

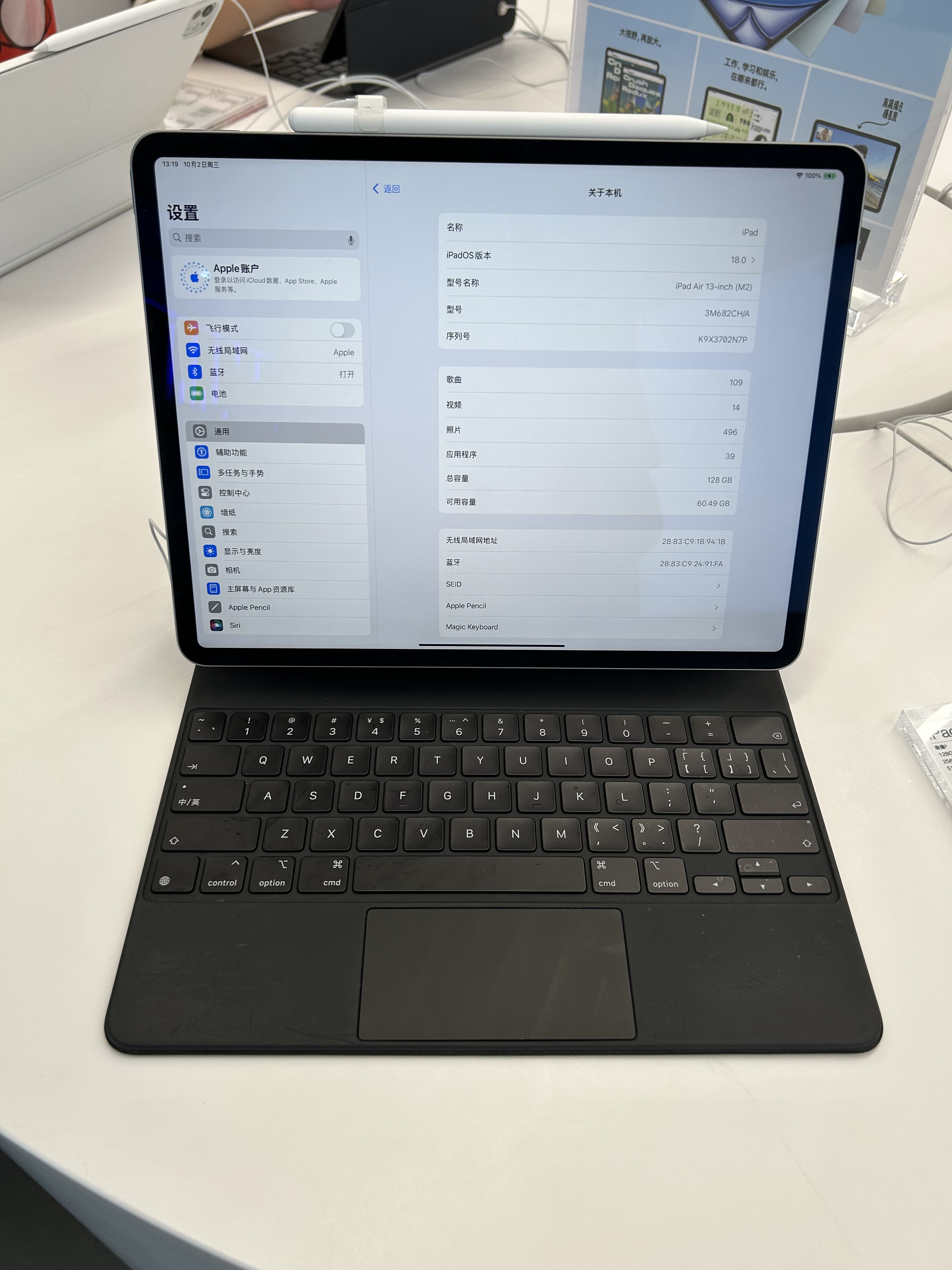
- iPad Air 13-inch
- Also known as: iPad Air 6 iPad Air (6th generation)
- Manufacturer: Foxconn
- Product family: iPad Air
- Type: Tablet computer
- Generation: 6th
- Released: May 15, 2024; 2 years ago
- Discontinued: March 4, 2025; 19 months ago
- Operating system: Original: iPadOS 17.5 Current: iPadOS 27.2, released October 26, 2026
- System on a chip: Apple M2
- Memory: 8 GB (LPDDR5 SDRAM)
- Storage: 128 GB, 256 GB, 512 GB, 1 TB
- Display: 11 inches (280 mm) (2,360 x 1,640) px (264 ppi), 500-nits max brightness 13 inches (330 mm) (2,732 x 2,048) px (264 ppi), 600-nits max brightness Wide-color (P3), true tone, fully laminated display, with support for Apple Pencil Pro and Apple Pencil (USB-C)
- Sound: Stereo speakers
- Input: Multi-touch screen, headset controls, proximity and ambient light sensors, 3-axis accelerometer, 3-axis gyroscope, digital compass, dual microphone, Touch ID fingerprint reader, barometer
- Camera: Front: 12 MP, ƒ/2.4 aperture, 1080p HD video recording Rear: 12 MP, ƒ/1.8 aperture, 2160p 4K 60fps video recording
- Connectivity: Wi-Fi and Wi-Fi + Cellular: 802.11 Wi-Fi 6 dual-band (2.4 GHz & 5 GHz) and MIMO Bluetooth 5.0 Wi-Fi + Cellular: GPS & GLONASS GSM UMTS / HSDPA 850, 1700, 1800, 1900 MHz LTE Multiple bands 1, 2, 3, 4, 5, 7, 8, 11, 12, 13, 14, 17, 18, 19, 20, 21, 25, 26, 29, 30, 34, 38, 39, 40, 41, 46, 48, 66, 71 5G NR Multiple bands n1, n2, n3, n5, n7, n8, n12, n20, n25, n28, n29, n30, n38, n40, n41, n48, n66, n71, n77, n78, n79
- Power: 11": 28.9 watt-hour lithium-polymer battery 13": 36.6 watt-hour lithium-polymer battery
- Online services: App Store, iTunes Store, Books, iCloud, Game Center, Apple Arcade
- Dimensions: 11": 247.6 mm (9.74 in) (h); 178.5 mm (7 in) (w); 6.1 mm (0.24 in) (d); 13": 280.6 mm (11.04 in) (h); 214.9 mm (8.46 in) (w); 6.1 mm (0.24 in) (d)
- Weight: 11" Wi-Fi/Wi-Fi + Cellular: 461/461 g (1.02/1.02 lbs); 13" Wi-Fi/Wi-Fi + Cellular: 617/618 g (1.36/1.36 lbs)
- Predecessor: iPad Air (5th generation)
- Successor: iPad Air (M3)
- Website: www.apple.com/ipad-air/

The sixth-generation iPad Air (commonly known as the iPad Air 6 or iPad Air (M2)) (Note: Officially referred to by Apple as the iPad Air 11-inch (M2) and the iPad Air 13-inch (M2)) is a tablet computer developed and marketed by Apple Inc. It was announced by Apple on May 7, 2024, with pre-orders starting the same day, and was released on May 15, 2024. It succeeds the iPad Air (5th generation) and is available in four colors: Blue, Purple, Space Gray, and Starlight. The iPad Air (M2) is the first iPad Air to include a 13-inch model alongside the existing 11-inch model. It was discontinued on March 4, 2025, upon the announcement of the iPad Air (M3).

== Features ==
=== Hardware ===
The sixth-generation iPad Air models use the Apple M2 SoC, with 8 GB of RAM and 128 GB of onboard flash storage, but storage can be upgraded to 256 GB, 512 GB, and 1 TB, respectively, for an additional fee. The M2 chip has 8 CPU cores and 9 GPU cores.

It also uses a Liquid Retina Display with 500 nits of brightness and a P3 color space. The 11-inch model has a 2360-by-1640 display, whereas the 13 inch model has a 2732-by-2048 display with 600 nits of brightness. Both models also support Apple Pencil Pro and Apple Pencil (USB-C). In addition, it also has a 12 MP front and back camera with Smart HDR 4 and up to 63 MP panorama photos. Like its predecessor, the sixth generation iPad Air also has Touch ID integrated into its sleep/wake button.

=== Connectivity ===
The sixth generation iPad Air includes a USB-C port for charging and connecting accessories. The port is capable of transferring data at a speed of 10 Gbit/s (approximately 1.25 GB/s), with DisplayPort capabilities, allowing the device to connect to external monitors. The device also comes with WiFi 6E (802.11ax) and Bluetooth 5.3 connectivity on all models, with cellular models adding sub-6 GHz 5G support.

Unlike its predecessors, the cellular model does not have a physical SIM card slot; it is only compatible with eSIM.

Like its predecessors, it is compatible with the Magic Keyboard for iPad.

=== Cameras ===
Front: 12 MP, ƒ/2.0 aperture, burst mode, timer mode, exposure control, face detection, Smart HDR 4, wide-color capture, auto image stabilization, Retina flash, 1080p HD video recording, center stage

Rear: 12 MP, ƒ/1.8 aperture, five-element lens, burst mode, timer mode, exposure control, noise reduction, face detection, Hybrid IR filter, Live Photos with stabilization, Autofocus with Focus Pixels, face detection, Smart HDR 4, panorama, wide-color capture, auto image stabilization, 2160p 4K 60fps video recording, video stabilization, slo-mo, time-lapse

== Timeline ==
Timeline of iPad models
See also: List of Apple products

Source: Apple Newsroom Archive.
