= EUICC =

Architectural standards for eSIM

eUICC (embedded UICC) refers to the architectural standards published by the GSM Association (GSMA) or implementations of those standards for eSIM, a device used to securely store one or more SIM card profiles, which are the unique identifiers and cryptographic keys used by cellular network service providers to uniquely identify and securely connect to mobile network devices. Applications of eUICC are found in mobile network devices (cell phones, tablets, portable computers, security controllers, medical devices, etc.) that use GSM cellular network eSIM technology.

== Standards ==
The core standards that define eUICC are published by the GSM Association in two topical areas.

=== Consumer and IOT ===
Core standards for implementing eSIM on mobile devices include the following articles:

- eSIM Architecture Specification
- eSIM IoT Architecture and Requirement Specification
- SGP 22 Remote Sim Provisioning(RSP) Architecture for consumer Devices

=== Machine-to-machine (M2M) ===
GSMA publishes standards for machine-to-machine (M2M) third-party provisioning of eSIM which includes the following articles:

- SGP.01 M2M eSIM Architecture v4.2
- SGP.02 eSIM Technical Specifications V4.2.1

== Implementation ==
eUICC can refer to any implementation or application of the eUICC standards in an eSIM device. Each implementation of eUICC includes software code, a processor to emulate the software, non-volatile memory used to store the unique identifiers and cryptographic keys that are part of a SIM profile, and a bus interface to communicate the SIM profile to the mobile device. eUICC standards specify that only one eUICC security controller (EUSD) may be implemented in an eSIM, but the eSIM may store multiple SIM profiles.

== EID ==
GSMA standards define EID as "eUICC identifier". Some developers / implementers have referred to this using the descriptive term "eSIM identifier", which summarizes the function of an eUICC identifier. Some third parties have joined this acronym with the term "electronic identity document", which is a general concept of any identifier stored or presented in electronic format.
