= ESIM =

Programmable SIM card embedded into a device

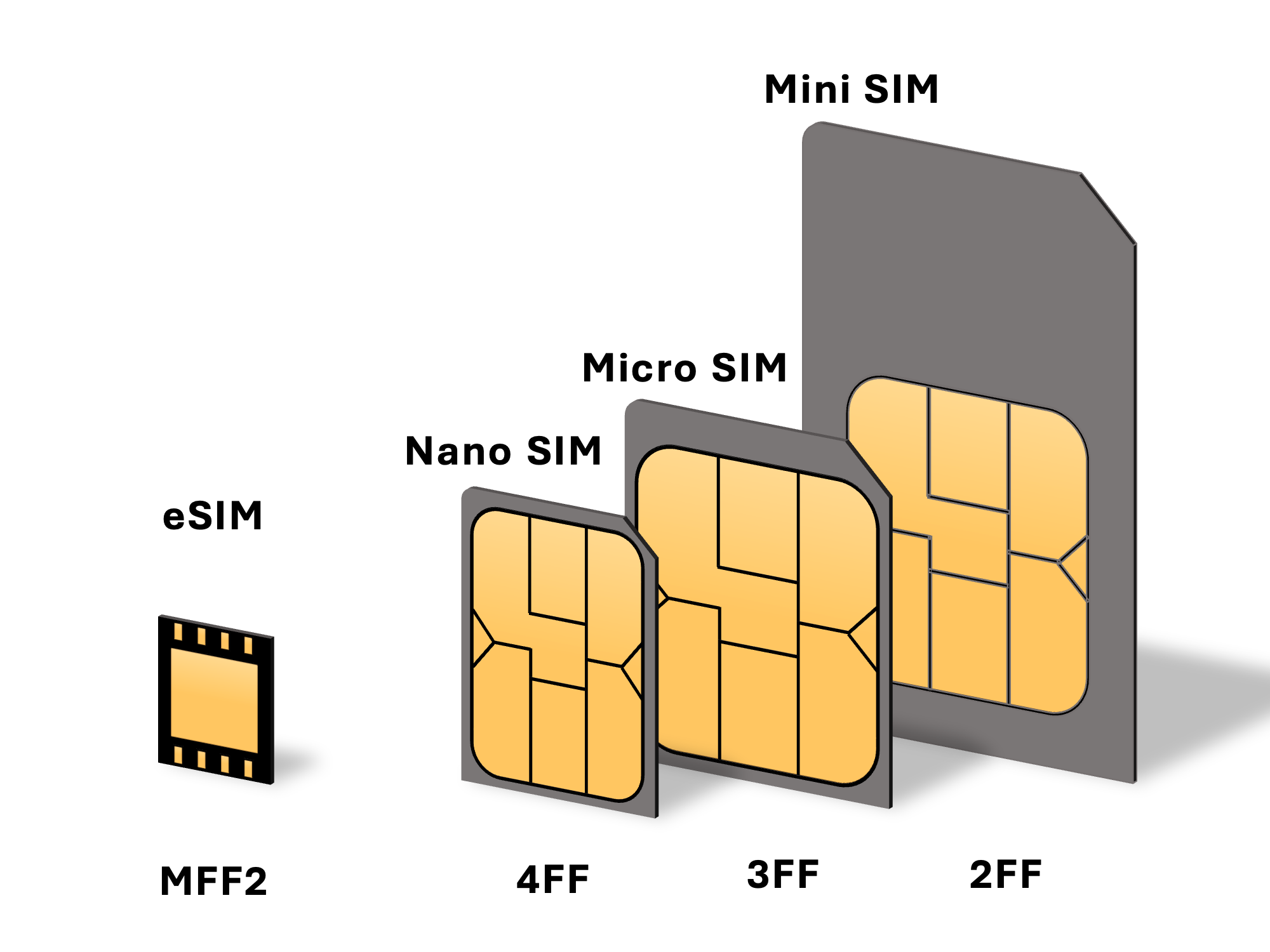
Evolution of SIM cards. An eSIM is not removable.

An eSIM (embedded subscriber identity module) is a form of SIM card that is embedded directly into a device as software installed onto an eUICC chip. In contrast to physical SIM cards, users can connect to and change mobile network operators via the device settings and without the need to physically add or swap a SIM card from the device. A single eSIM plan can connect to several mobile network operators. Devices can hold upwards of 20 eSIM plans simultaneously, with 1 or 2 active.

To reduce costs, many eSIM plans only provide data and do not include a phone number. Most phones and tablets released in 2018 or later support eSIM technology. If a phone is bought directly from a carrier with a SIM lock, the phone can only add eSIMs from the carrier that locked the phone, even after a carrier unlock.

== Technical specifications ==
The eUICC chip used to host the eSIM is installed via surface-mount technology at the factory and uses the same electrical interface as a physical SIM as defined in ISO/IEC 7816 but with a small format of 6 mm × 5 mm. Once an eSIM carrier profile has been installed on an eUICC, it operates in the same way as a physical SIM, complete with a unique ICCID and network authentication key generated by the carrier. If the eSIM is eUICC-compatible, it can be re-programmed with new SIM information. Otherwise, the eSIM is programmed with its ICCID/IMSI and other information at the time it is manufactured, and cannot be changed. One common physical form factor of an eUICC chip is commonly designated Machine-to-Machine Form Factor 2 (MFF2).

All eUICCs are programmed with a permanent eUICC ID (EID) at the factory, which is used by the provisioning service to associate the device with an existing carrier subscription as well as to negotiate a secure channel for programming. eSIMs connect to mobile network operators via remote SIM provisioning. The GSMA maintains three versions of the eSIM standard: one for consumer devices (SGP.22), one for machine-to-machine (M2M) devices (SGP.02), and a dedicated IoT specification (SGP.32) published in May 2023, which introduced server-driven remote profile management suited to unattended, large-scale IoT deployments.

== History ==
=== Development ===
In November 2010, the GSMA began discussing the possibility of a software-based SIM. In March 2012, at the meeting of the European Telecommunications Standards Institute, Motorola noted that eUICC is geared at industrial devices, while Apple foresaw eSIMs in consumer products. The eSIM was released in March 2016. In March 2017, during Mobile World Congress, Qualcomm introduced a technical solution, with a live demonstration, within its Snapdragon hardware chip associated with related software (secured Java applications).

=== First devices launched with eSIM ===
In February 2016, Samsung released the Samsung Gear S2 Classic 3G smartwatch, the first device to implement an eSIM. The first Apple device released with eSIM technology was the Apple Watch Series 3, released in September 2017. In 2018, it introduced it to iPhone, with the iPhone XS and iPhone XR, and iPad, with the iPad Pro (3rd generation). The first iPhone models lacking a SIM card tray and requiring use of eSIMs were the US-sold iPhone 14 and iPhone 14 Pro, announced in 2022. Outside the United States, all iPhone models continue to be sold with support for physical SIM cards, but the iPad Air (6th generation), iPad Pro (7th generation), and iPad Mini (7th generation), announced in 2024, work exclusively with eSIM. As of September 2025, the iPhone 17, iPhone 17 Pro are eSIM only in a number of countries, touting larger batteries in this configuration, and the iPhone Air is also Apple's first device with no physical SIM capability in any country.

In October 2017, Google unveiled the Pixel 2, the first mobile phone to use an eSIM, available via its Google Fi Wireless service. In 2018, Google released the Pixel 3 and Pixel 3 XL and in May 2019, the Pixel 3a and Pixel 3a XL, with eSIM support for carriers other than Google Fi. While the Pixel 3 series only supported one concurrent SIM or eSIM, the Pixel 3a series supported dual-SIM with one physical SIM and one eSIM. Starting with the Pixel 7, dual eSIM became supported, but one physical SIM card can still be used. US-sold Pixel 10 series devices (except the Pixel 10 Pro Fold) were the first devices by Google (outside of select carrier-locked Sprint Nexus devices) that lack physical SIM card slots, therefore requiring use of eSIMs.

In December 2017, Microsoft launched its first eSIM-enabled device, the Microsoft Surface Pro LTE. In 2018, Microsoft also introduced eSIM to the Windows 10 operating system. Motorola released the 2020 version of the Motorola Razr, a foldable smartphone that only supports eSIM. Samsung shipped the Samsung Galaxy S21 and S20 in North America with eSIM hardware onboard but no software support out of the box. The feature was enabled with the One UI version 4 update in November 2021.

== See also ==
- Category:ESIM companies
