= IPad =

Line of tablet computers by Apple

iPad

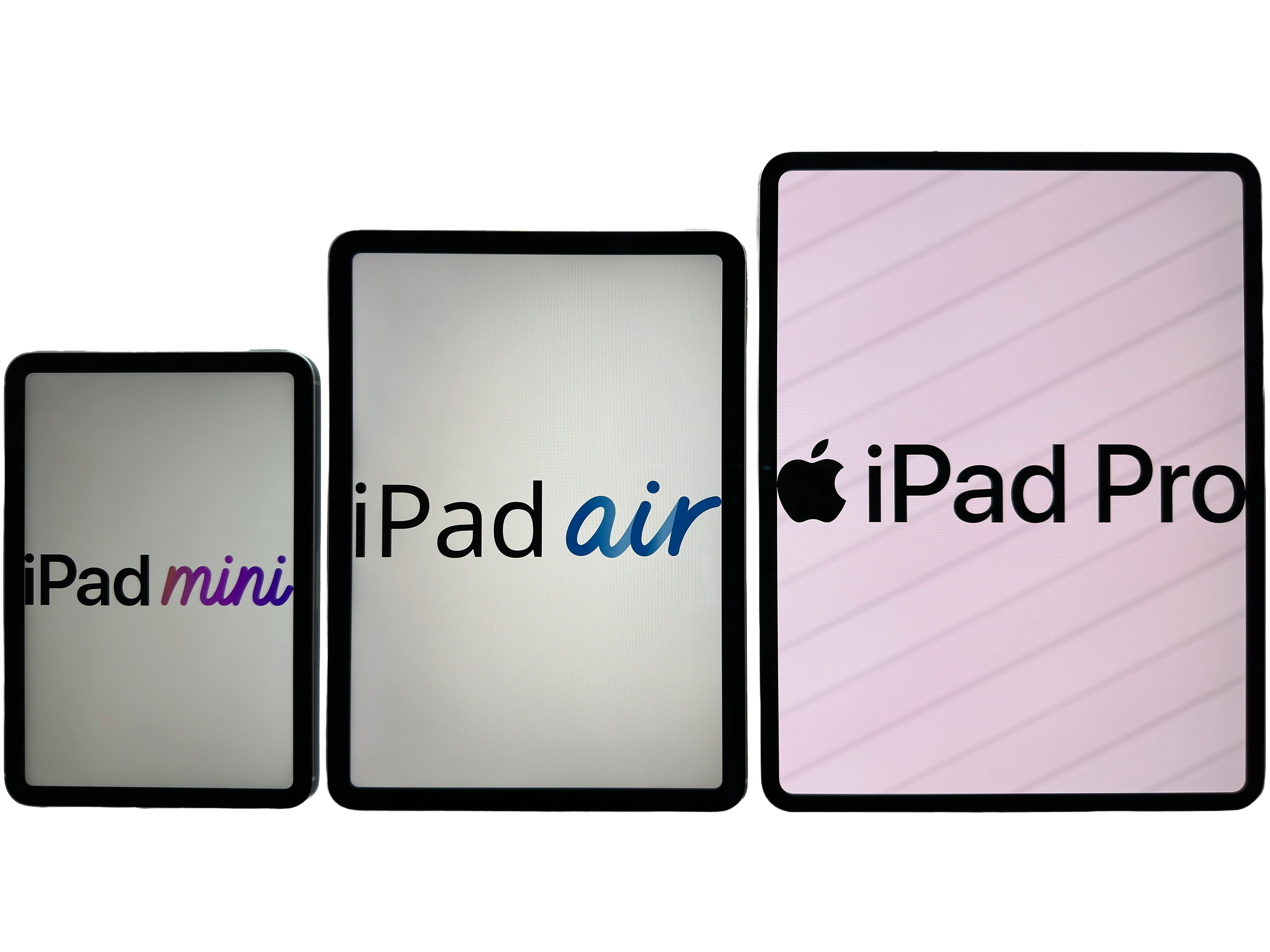
- Front faces of the iPad mini, iPad Air and iPad Pro
- Developer: Apple
- Manufacturer: Foxconn (on contract); Pegatron
- Type: Tablet computer
- Released: April 3, 2010; 16 years ago (1st generation)
- Units sold: 677.7 million (as of 2022)
- Operating system: iOS (2010–2019) iPadOS (2019–present)
- Connectivity: WiFi, cellular, 30-pin dock connector, Lightning connector, USB-C, 3.5 mm headphone jack, 3-pin "Smart connector"
- Online services: iTunes Store; App Store; iCloud; Apple Books; Podcasts; Apple Music; Apple Wallet
- Related: iPhone, iPod Touch, comparison of iPad models
- Website: apple.com/ipad

The iPad is a brand of tablet computers developed and marketed by Apple since 2010. The first-generation iPad was introduced on January 27, 2010. Since then, the iPad product line has been expanded to include the smaller iPad Mini, the lighter and thinner iPad Air, and the flagship iPad Pro models. As of 2022, over 670 million iPads have been sold, making Apple the largest vendor of tablet computers. Due to its popularity, the term "iPad" is sometimes used as a generic name for tablet computers.

The iPhone's iOS operating system (OS) was initially used for the iPad, but in September 2019, its OS was switched to a fork of iOS called iPadOS that has better support for the device's hardware and a user interface tailored to the tablets' larger screens. Since then, major versions of iPadOS have been released annually. The iPad's App Store is subject to application and content approval. Many older devices are susceptible to jailbreaking, which circumvents these restrictions.

The original iPad was well-received for its software and was recognized as one of the most-influential inventions of 2010. As of the third quarter of 2021, the iPad had a market share of 34.6% among tablets. Beside personal use, the iPad is used in the business, education, healthcare, and technology sectors. There are two connectivity variants of iPad; one has only Wi-Fi, and one has additional support for cellular networks. Accessories for the iPad include the Apple Pencil, Smart Case, Smart Keyboard, Smart Keyboard Folio, Magic Keyboard, and several adapters.

== History ==
=== Background ===
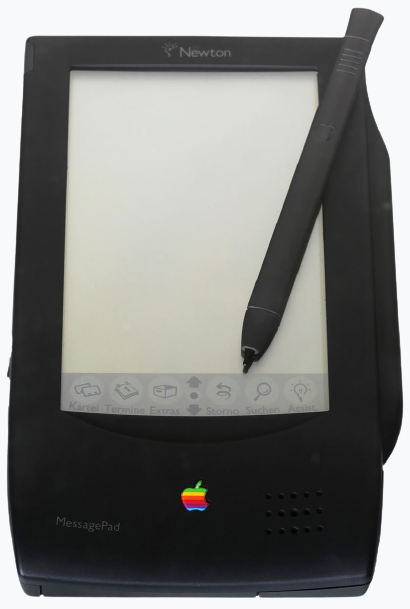
The Newton MessagePad, 1993

Apple co-founder Steve Jobs said in a 1983 speech:

What we want to do is we want to put an incredibly great computer in a book that you can carry around with you and learn how to use in 20 minutes ... and we really want to do it with a radio link in it so you don't have to hook up to anything and you're in communication with all of these larger databases and other computers.

In 1993, Apple worked on the Newton MessagePad, a tablet-like personal digital assistant (PDA). John Sculley, Apple's chief executive officer, led the development. The MessagePad was poorly received for its indecipherable handwriting recognition feature and was discontinued at the direction of Jobs, who returned to Apple in 1998 after an internal power struggle. Apple also prototyped a PowerBook Duo–based tablet computer but decided not to release it to avoid hurting MessagePad sales.

In May 2004, Apple filed a design trademark patent in Europe for a handheld computer, hypothetically referencing the iPad, beginning a new round of speculation that led to a 2003 report of Apple-affiliated manufacturer Quanta leaking Apple's orders for wireless displays. In May 2005, Apple filed US Design Patent No. D504,889 that included an illustration depicting a man touching and using a tablet device. In August 2008, Apple filed a 50-page patent application that includes an illustration of hands touching and gesturing on a tablet computer. In September 2009, Taiwan Economic News, citing "industry sources", reported the tablet computer Apple was working on would be announced in February 2010, although the announcement was made in that year's January.

The iPad's concept predates that of the iPhone, although the iPhone was developed and released before the iPad. In 1991, Apple's chief design officer Jonathan Ive devised an industrial design of a stylus-based tablet, the Macintosh Folio, which led to the development of a larger tablet prototype project codenamed K48 that Apple began in 2004. Ive sought to develop the tablet first but came to an agreement with Jobs that the iPhone was more important and should be prioritized.

=== iPad ===
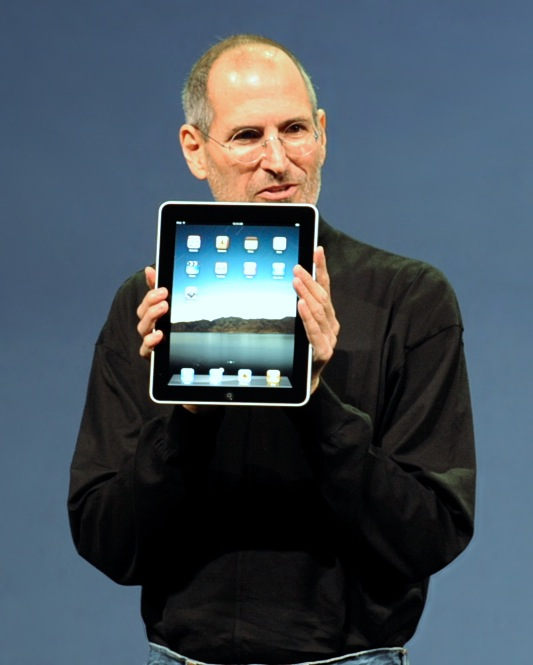
Steve Jobs announcing the first generation of iPad, 2010

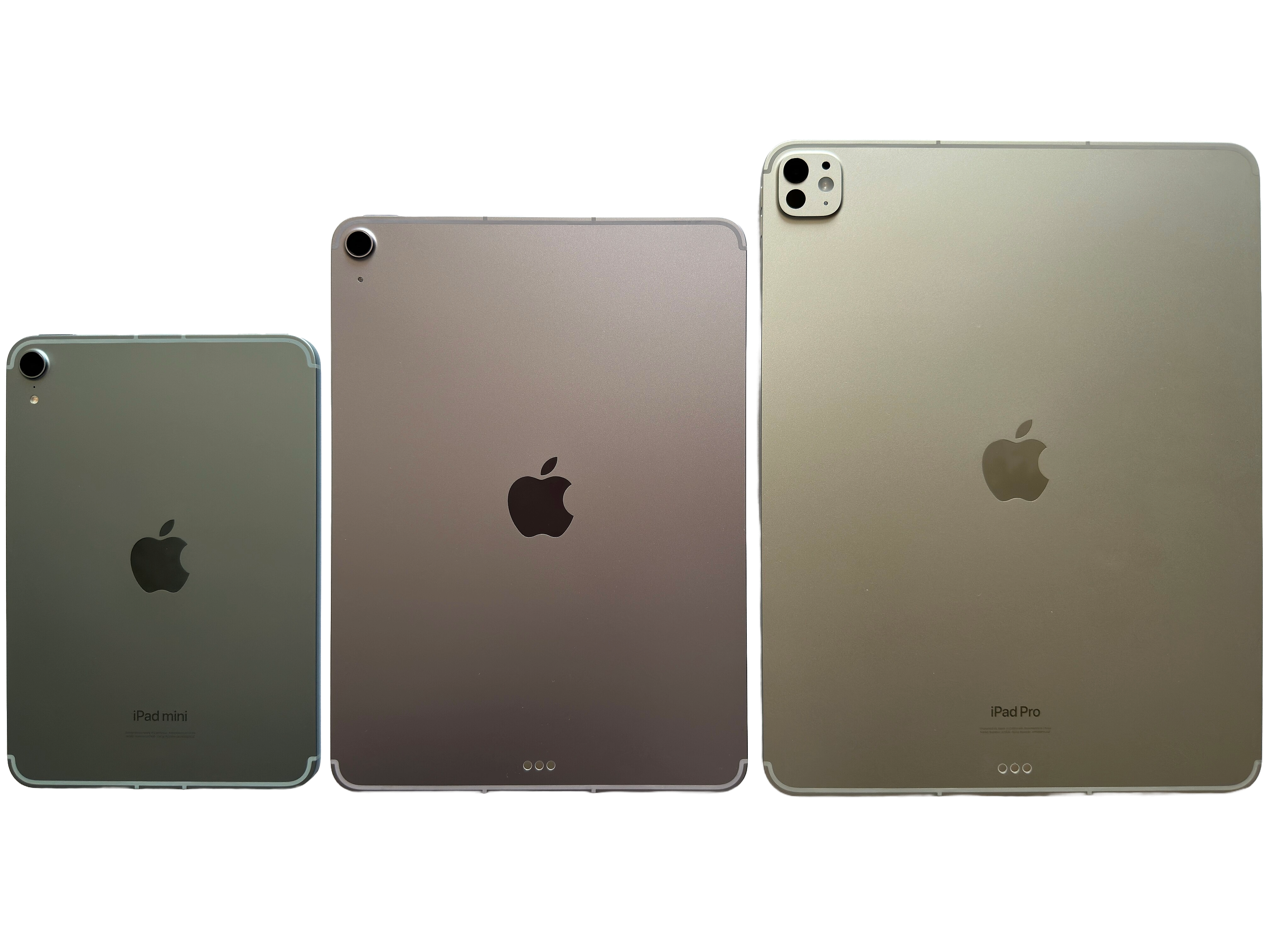
Backside of the iPad mini, iPad Air and iPad Pro

The first generation of iPad was announced on January 27, 2010, and pre-ordering began on March 12. Initial reaction to the product name, which struck some women as a menstrual pun "indicative of a male-helmed team oblivious" to the connotations, was negative.

A Wi-Fi-capable version was released in the United States on April 3 and a 3G-capable version was released on April 30. Apple released iPad models internationally on May 28, July 23, and September 17. The first iPad has a 1 GHz Apple A4 CPU with 256 MB of RAM and a PowerVR SGX535 GPU. It has four buttons; a home button that directs the user to its homepage, a wake-and-sleep button, and two volume-control buttons. Its multi-touch-based display has a resolution of 1,024 by 768 pixels.

The second generation of iPad was announced on March 2, 2011, and released on March 11. It is 33% thinner and 15% lighter than its predecessor, and uses a dual-core Apple A5 chip consisting of a twice-as-fast CPU and a nine-times-faster GPU. It has one camera each on the front and the back, both of which support Apple's video-telephony service, FaceTime. Apple slimmed the iPad by eliminating the display's stamped-sheet-metal frame, using thinner glass for the screen overlay, and eliminating some space between the display and battery.

The third generation of iPad was announced on March 7, 2012, and released on March 16. It uses a dual-core Apple A5X chip embedded with quad-core graphics. Its Retina Display is 2,048 by 1,536 pixels and its pixels are 50% denser than those of standard displays. Unlike the iPhone and iPod Touch's built-in applications, which work in portrait, landscape-left and landscape-right orientations, the iPad's built-in applications support the upside-down orientation of the device. Consequently, the device has no "native" orientation; only the relative position of the home button changes.

The fourth generation of iPad was announced on October 23, 2012, and released on November 2. It has an Apple A6X chip, replaces the 30-pin dock connector with a Lightning port, has improved LTE and WiFi connectivity, a five-megapixel, rear-facing camera that is capable of recording 1080p videos, and a 720p front-facing FaceTime HD camera. Its display has a resolution of 2,048 by 1,536 pixels.

The fifth generation of iPad was announced on March 21, 2017, and released on March 24. It uses an Apple A9 chip with an accompanying M9 motion coprocessor, and its cameras can capture low-light and HD-quality shots. Despite using the same Apple A9 and M9 processors as the 2015 iPhone 6S, it lacks support of the always-on "Hey Siri" voice recognition, a feature advertised as being made possible by low-power processing in those chips.

The sixth generation of iPad was announced and released on March 27, 2018. It uses a dual-core Apple A10 Fusion chip and feature a 1080p and 30fps rear mounted 8-megapixel iSight camera, and a 720p FaceTime HD camera. It was the first non-Pro iPad to support the Apple Pencil. It also had faster FaceTime HD, LTE connectivity, Touch ID, and multitask functionalities.

The seventh generation of iPad was announced on September 10, 2019, and released on September 25. It uses a 64-bit Apple A10 Fusion chip, with a 4-core CPU and 6-core GPU. Its slightly larger 10.2 in (260 mm) Retina Display has a resolution of 2,160 × 1,620 (3.5 million pixels). It added support for the Smart Keyboard accessory.

The eighth generation of iPad was announced on September 15, 2020, and released on September 18. It uses an Apple A12 Bionic chip, which has a 40 percent faster 6-core CPU and a 2-times faster 4-core GPU than its predecessor. The Apple A12 also included an embedded Neural Engine, and is capable of processing 5 trillion operations per second.

The ninth generation of iPad was announced and released on September 14, 2021. It uses an Apple A13 Bionic chip, which has a 20% faster CPU and GPU and an embedded, artificial intelligence–immersed Neural Engine. Its 12-megapixel ultra wide front camera adds support for Apple's "Center Stage Mode" technology, which locates people in the frame and tracks the camera view to keep them centered. Its Retina Display added support for the True Tone technology, which automatically adjusts the screen color temperature according to the ambient lighting.

The tenth generation of iPad was announced on October 18, 2022, with pre-orders starting immediately and availability set for October 26. It uses the Apple A14 Bionic chip, has a larger 10.9 in (280 mm) screen, and replaces the Lightning connector with USB-C. Unlike all previous models in the iPad range, as well as the sixth-generation iPad Pro announced the same day, this model's front-facing camera is placed along the device's long edge, making it more suitable for video calling applications. Despite having a USB-C connector, it is not compatible with the second-generation Apple Pencil that can be used with all other USB-C iPads, instead using the first-generation Pencil with a USB-C-to-Lightning adapter, which will be included with new Pencil purchases. While lacking the Smart Connector of the Pro and Air lines, it is compatible with a new Magic Keyboard Folio announced alongside the device. This model did not immediately replace the 9th-generation iPad; Apple continued to sell the older model at the same price, while the price for the newer 10th-generation model was increased.

The eleventh generation of iPad was announced on March 4, 2025, with the general availability set for March 12, 2025. It uses the A16 chip and starts with the 128 GB storage capacity option and added the new 512 GB storage capacity option. The "iPad" branding and regulatory information have been removed from the back of the device.

=== iPad Mini ===
Logo of iPad Mini, 2026

The first generation of the flagship, smaller iPad Mini was announced on October 23, 2012, and released on November 2. The 7.9 in (200 mm) display has a resolution of 1024 by 768 pixels. The tablet uses a dual-core Apple A5 chip, and has hardware resembling that of the second generation of iPad. It has a FaceTime HD camera, a 5-megapixel iSight camera, an ultrafast wireless LTE range, and a 802.11a/b/g/n standard Wifi connectivity. It targets the emerging sector of mini tablets, such as Kindle Fire and Nexus 7.

The second generation of iPad Mini was announced on October 22, 2013, and released on November 12. Its hardware resembles that of the first generation of iPad Air.

The third generation of iPad Mini was announced on October 16, 2014, and released on October 22. It uses an Apple A7 chip with an embedded M7 motion coprocessor, and its 7.9 in (200 mm) Retina screen display has a resolution of 2048 by 1536 pixels. It includes a 1080p HD camera, a FaceTime HD camera, and a 5-megapixel iSight camera.

The fourth generation of iPad Mini was announced and released on September 9, 2015. It uses a dual-core Apple A8 chip with an embedded Apple M8 motion coprocessor. Its headphone jack was re-positioned with the removal of a mute switch.

The fifth generation of iPad Mini was announced and released on March 18, 2019. It uses an Apple A12 Bionic chip, with a 3-times faster CPU and a 9-times faster GPU than its predecessor. It features a Truetone-based Retina screen display with 25% wider Color and higher pixel density.

The sixth generation of iPad Mini was announced and released on September 24, 2021. The display size was increased to 8.3 in (210 mm). It uses an Apple A15 Bionic chip, with a 40% faster 6-core CPU and 80% faster 5-core GPU. Its 16-core Neural Engine and AI accelerators within the CPU delivers a 2× boost of AI performance. Its 12-megapixel Ultra Wide front camera featured Apple's "Center Stage Mode" technology, while its 12-megapixel back camera had larger apertures, True Tone flash, and Smart HDR automatic shadow and highlight recovery. It includes a USB-C port, capable of transferring up to 5 gigabits per second of data; improved landscape stereo speakers; and a brighter Liquid Retina Display.

The seventh generation of iPad Mini was announced on October 15, 2024. It is powered by an Apple A17 Pro chip, which Apple says has 30 percent faster CPU, 25 percent faster GPU and a neural engine twice as fast as the previous generation. This model is marketed by Apple as "built for Apple Intelligence", its suite of artificial intelligence features. The storage on the lowest priced variant has increased from 64GB of previous generation to 128GB. The new Wi-Fi 6E chip is faster, the USB-C port is faster compared to previous generations. Like the iPad Pro (M4) and the iPad Air (M2), it is only compatible with the Apple Pencil Pro alongside the lower-entry Apple Pencil with USB-C port, making it incompatible with the Apple Pencil (2nd generation). It is not compatible with the Magic Keyboard for iPad and Smart Keyboard Folio due to its smaller form factor.

The eighth generation of iPad Mini was announced on October 26, 2026. It is powered by the A20 Pro chip, and features an 8.5-inch OLED display, a landscape front-facing camera, and a nano-texture display option. This generation also features the new Acoustic Display system, which uses the display to produce sound.

=== iPad Air ===
Logo of iPad Air, 2020

The first generation of iPad Air was announced on October 22, 2013, and released on November 1. It uses an Apple A7 chip with an embedded Apple M7 Motion coprocessor; the chip included over a billion transistors and comprised a 2× faster CPU and GPU. It debuted the 802.11n-based MINO technology used in its Wi-Fi connectivity, and it had an extended range of LTE telecommunication. It also came with a Retina Display.

The second generation of iPad Air was announced on October 16, 2014, and released on October 22. It uses an Apple A8X chip with a 2.5× faster CPU. Its 8 MP iSight Camera had 1.12-micrometer pixels and an f/2.4 aperture, while its FaceTime Camera has an f/2.2 aperture and 81% light capacity. Its display had a revised 56% lower reflective rate. It also had an extended range of LTE telecommunication service.

The third generation of iPad Air was announced on March 18, 2019, and released on March 25. It uses an Apple A12 Bionic with an embedded Neural Engine, 6-core CPU and 4-core GPU. Its 866 Mbit/s WiFi connectivity are LTE-based, and it is equipped with a 1080p HD video camera.

The fourth generation of iPad Air was announced on September 15, 2020, and released on October 23. It uses an Apple A14 Bionic chip, which comprised 11.9 billion transistors, a 40% faster 6-core CPU, a 30% faster 4-core GPU, and an embedded Neural Engine that can process 11 trillion operations per second. Its 10.9 in (280 mm) Liquid Retina Screen display has a resolution of 2360 by 1640 pixels (3.8 million pixels). Its front 7-megapixel FaceTime Camera is of 1080p and 60 fps, while its 12-megapixel webcam featured f/1.8 aperture, 4K, 60fps, and video stabilization. The fourth generation iPad Air replaces the Lightning connector with USB-C.

The fifth generation of iPad Air was announced on March 8, 2022, and released on March 18. It uses an Apple M1 chip.

The sixth generation of iPad Air was announced on May 7, 2024, with the general availability on May 15. It uses the Apple M2 chip. It is the first iPad Air to be available in two display size options: 11 in (280 mm) and 13 in (330 mm). It features the Apple Pencil hover which is previously featured on the iPad Pro (6th generation) and the landscape oriented front-facing camera which is previously used on the tenth-generation iPad. Like the seventh generation of iPad Pro, it is only compatible with the Apple Pencil Pro alongside the entry-level Apple Pencil with USB-C port, making it incompatible with the Apple Pencil (2nd generation). Unlike the seventh generation of iPad Pro, it is only compatible with the Magic Keyboard that was designed for the third, fourth, fifth, and sixth generations of iPad Pro.

The seventh generation of iPad Air was announced on March 4, 2025, and was released on March 12. It uses the Apple M3 chip. The "iPad Air" branding and regulatory information have been removed from the back of the device.

The eighth generation of iPad Air was announced on March 2, 2026, and was released on March 11. It uses the Apple M4 chip with 12 GB of RAM.

=== iPad Pro ===
Logo of iPad Pro, 2021

The first generation of the high-end and professional flagship iPad Pro was announced on September 9, 2015, and released on November 11, (12.9 in (330 mm)h version) and March 31 (9.7 in (250 mm)). It used an Apple A9X chip, with a 2× higher memory bandwidth and a 1.8× faster CPU than its predecessor. Its audio system consisted of 4 audio ports and its volume were more 3× more efficient than the second generation of iPad Air, and its 12 in (300 mm) screen display had a resolution of 2732 by 2043 pixels.

The second generation of iPad Pro was announced on June 5, 2017, and was released on June 13. It used an Apple A10X Fusion chip, with a 6-core CPU and 12-core GPU. It can process 120 Hz HDR quality medias, 2× higher quality than its predecessor. Its ultra-low reflective Retina Display featured a 50% optimized True Tone technology (which automatically adjust the screen accordingly to its ambient color and brightness rates), Wide Color Integration, and up to 500 nit brightness rates. It also had a 12-megapixel rear-facing camera and a 7-megapixel front-facing camera.

The third generation of iPad Pro was announced on October 30, 2018, and released on November 7, and it is the first iPad to support 1 TB of storage. It used a 7 nm Apple A12X Bionic chip, which comprised 11 billion transistors, an 8-core CPU, 7-core GPU and an embedded Neural Engine capable of processing 5 trillion operations per second. Apple replaced the Touch ID fingerprint recognition biometric authentication with its facial counterpart, Face ID.

The fourth generation of iPad Pro was announced and released on March 18, 2020. It used an Apple A12Z Bionic chip, with an 8-core CPU and 8-core GPU. Its Gbit-class Wi-Fi connectivity is 60% faster than that of its predecessor. It introduced a 10-megapixel ultra-wide camera, alongside its 12-megapixel wide camera, capable of capturing 4k video. These cameras allow it to capture medias with wider visibility, and its audio system automatically detects and attracts any orientation nearby.

The fifth generation of iPad Pro was announced on April 20, 2021, and released on May 21. It used an innovative desktop-class Apple M1 chip, which comprised a 40% faster 8-core CPU, a 4× faster 8-core GPU, and a 4× higher bandwidth. It featured a ƒ/1.8 aperture 12-megapixel wide-angle pro camera (captures high quality shots) and a ƒ/2.4 aperture 10-megapixel ultrawide camera (captures enhanced Augmented Reality interactive experience). It debuted Apple's "Center Stage mode" technology, which pinpoints the positions of the users and automatically tracks the camera view accordingly to perspectivally centralize them. The 12.9 in (330 mm) version had a mini LED-based Liquid Retina XDR display, compared to the 11 in (280 mm) model's lesser IPS LCD-based Liquid Retina display.

The sixth generation of iPad Pro was announced on October 18, 2022, and released on October 26. It used an Apple M2 chip, with an 8-core CPU and 10-core GPU.

The seventh generation of iPad Pro was announced on May 7, 2024, and released on May 15. It uses an Apple M4, making it the first Apple device to use this chip. It is the first iPad Pro to use OLED display, called Ultra XDR Retina Display. The chassis design is about 5.3 mm thin on the 11 in (280 mm) model and 5.1 mm thin on the 13 in (330 mm) model, thinner than previous models. It features a Tandem OLED display, an updated Pro Cameras (which lacks the ultra-wide camera lens), and a landscape oriented front-facing camera, previously used in the iPad (10th generation). It is only compatible with the Apple Pencil Pro, the lower-entry Apple Pencil with USB-C port and the new, thinner Magic Keyboard, making it incompatible with the Apple Pencil (2nd generation) and the Magic Keyboard that was designed for the 3rd through 6th generations.

The eighth generation of iPad Pro, announced on October 15, 2025, with a release on October 22 features the Apple M5 chip. While keeping the same design as the previous model, iPad Pro (M5) features new fast charging with a 50 percent charge in 30 minutes using the 40-watt Dynamic Power Adapter. The Apple C1X modem and Apple N1 networking chip enable Bluetooth 6 and Wi-Fi 7 on iPad for the first time. The "iPad Pro" branding and regulatory information have been removed from the back of the device.

== Hardware ==
iPad models currently in production
Release date	Model	System on a chip	Keyboard	Apple Pencil(s)
March 12, 2025	iPad (A16)	Apple A16	Magic Keyboard Folio	Apple Pencil (USB-C); Apple Pencil (1st generation)
October 22, 2025	iPad Pro (M5)	Apple M5	Magic Keyboard for iPad Pro	Apple Pencil (USB-C); Apple Pencil Pro
March 11, 2026	iPad Air (M4)	Apple M4	Magic Keyboard for iPad Air	Apple Pencil (USB-C); Apple Pencil Pro
November 6, 2026	iPad Mini (A20 Pro)	Apple A20 Pro	—N/a	Apple Pencil (USB-C); Apple Pencil Pro

=== Overview ===
Availability and support lifespan of all iPad models
Model	Announced	Release(d)		Discontinued	Support		
Model	Announced	With OS	Date	Discontinued	Latest OS	Ended	Lifespan (Note: The duration of software support, from the initial release date to the date of the final software update for the device.)
iPad (1st)	January 27, 2010	iPhone OS 3.2	April 3, 2010	March 2, 2011	iOS 5.1.1	May 7, 2012	2 years, 1 month
iPad 2	March 2, 2011	iOS 4.3	March 11, 2011	March 18, 2014	iOS 9.3.5 iOS 9.3.6	August 25, 2016 (Wi-Fi, Wi-Fi + Cellular (GSM)); July 22, 2019 (Wi-Fi + Cellular (CDMA))	5 years, 5 months (Wi-Fi, Wi-Fi + Cellular (GSM)); 8 years, 4 months (Wi-Fi + Cellular (CDMA))
iPad (3rd)	March 7, 2012	iOS 5.1	March 16, 2012	October 23, 2012	iOS 9.3.5 iOS 9.3.6	August 25, 2016 (Wi-Fi); July 22, 2019 (Wi-Fi + Cellular)	4 years, 5 months (Wi-Fi); 7 years, 4 months (Wi-Fi + Cellular)
iPad Mini (1st)	October 23, 2012	iOS 6.0	November 2, 2012	June 19, 2015	iOS 9.3.5 iOS 9.3.6	August 25, 2016 (Wi-Fi); July 22, 2019 (Wi-Fi + Cellular)	3 years, 9 months (Wi-Fi); 6 years, 8 months (Wi-Fi + Cellular)
iPad (4th)	October 23, 2012	iOS 6.0	November 2, 2012	October 16, 2014	iOS 10.3.3 iOS 10.3.4	July 19, 2017 (Wi-Fi); July 22, 2019 (Wi-Fi + Cellular)	4 years, 8 months (Wi-Fi); 6 years, 8 months (Wi-Fi + Cellular)
iPad Mini 2	October 22, 2013	iOS 7.0.3	November 12, 2013	March 21, 2017	iOS 12.5.8	January 26, 2026	12 years, 2 months
iPad Air (1st)	October 22, 2013	iOS 7.0.3	November 1, 2013	March 21, 2016	iOS 12.5.8	January 26, 2026	12 years, 2 months
iPad Mini 3	October 16, 2014	iOS 8.1	October 22, 2014	September 9, 2015	iOS 12.5.8	January 26, 2026	11 years, 3 months
iPad Air 2	October 16, 2014	iOS 8.1	October 22, 2014	March 21, 2017	iPadOS 15.8.8	May 11, 2026	11 years, 6 months
iPad Mini 4	September 9, 2015	iOS 9.0	September 9, 2015	March 18, 2019	iPadOS 15.8.8	May 11, 2026	10 years, 8 months
iPad Pro (1st) 12.9-inch	September 9, 2015	iOS 9.1	November 11, 2015	June 5, 2017	iPadOS 16.7.16	May 11, 2026	10 years, 6 months
iPad Pro (1st) 9.7-inch	March 21, 2016	iOS 9.3	March 31, 2016	June 5, 2017	iPadOS 16.7.16	May 11, 2026	10 years, 1 month
iPad (5th)	March 21, 2017	iOS 10.3	March 24, 2017	March 27, 2018	iPadOS 16.7.16	May 11, 2026	9 years, 1 month
iPad Pro (2nd)	June 5, 2017	iOS 10.3	June 13, 2017	March 18, 2019 10.5"; October 30, 2018 12.9"	iPadOS 17.7.11	May 11, 2026	8 years, 10 months
iPad (6th)	March 27, 2018	iOS 11.3	March 27, 2018	September 10, 2019	iPadOS 17.7.11	May 11, 2026	8 years, 1 month
iPad Pro (3rd)	October 30, 2018	iOS 12.1	November 7, 2018	March 18, 2020	iPadOS 26.7.3	Receiving security updates November 9, 2026	8 years
iPad Mini (5th)	March 18, 2019	iOS 12.2	March 18, 2019	September 14, 2021	iPadOS 26.7.3	Receiving security updates November 9, 2026	7 years, 8 months
iPad Air (3rd)	March 18, 2019	iOS 12.2	March 18, 2019	September 15, 2020	iPadOS 26.7.3	Receiving security updates November 9, 2026	7 years, 8 months
iPad (7th)	September 10, 2019	iPadOS 13.1	September 25, 2019	September 15, 2020	iPadOS 18.7.12	Receiving security updates November 9, 2026	7 years, 1 month
iPad Pro (4th)	March 18, 2020	iPadOS 13.4	March 25, 2020	April 20, 2021	Latest iPadOS iPadOS 27.2.1	Supported; November 9, 2026	6 years, 7 months
iPad (8th)	September 15, 2020	iPadOS 14.0	September 18, 2020	September 14, 2021	iPadOS 26.7.3	Receiving security updates November 9, 2026	6 years, 2 months
iPad Air (4th)	September 15, 2020	iPadOS 14.0	October 23, 2020	March 8, 2022	Latest iPadOS iPadOS 27.2.1	Supported; November 9, 2026	6 years
iPad Pro (5th)	April 20, 2021	iPadOS 14.5	May 21, 2021	October 18, 2022	Latest iPadOS iPadOS 27.2.1	Supported; November 9, 2026	5 years, 5 months
iPad (9th)	September 14, 2021	iPadOS 15.0	September 24, 2021	May 7, 2024	Latest iPadOS iPadOS 27.2.1	Supported; November 9, 2026	5 years, 1 month
iPad Mini (6th)	September 14, 2021	iPadOS 15.0	September 24, 2021	October 15, 2024	Latest iPadOS iPadOS 27.2.1	Supported; November 9, 2026	5 years, 1 month
iPad Air (5th)	March 8, 2022	iPadOS 15.4	March 18, 2022	May 7, 2024	Latest iPadOS iPadOS 27.2.1	Supported; November 9, 2026	4 years, 8 months
iPad Pro (6th)	October 18, 2022	iPadOS 16.0	October 26, 2022	May 7, 2024	Latest iPadOS iPadOS 27.2.1	Supported; November 9, 2026	4 years
iPad (10th)	October 18, 2022	iPadOS 16.0	October 26, 2022	March 4, 2025	Latest iPadOS iPadOS 27.2.1	Supported; November 9, 2026	4 years
iPad Air (M2)	May 7, 2024	iPadOS 17.4	May 15, 2024	March 4, 2025	Latest iPadOS iPadOS 27.2.1	Supported; November 9, 2026	2 years, 6 months
iPad Pro (M4)	May 7, 2024	iPadOS 17.4	May 15, 2024	October 15, 2025	Latest iPadOS iPadOS 27.2.1	Supported; November 9, 2026	2 years, 6 months
iPad Mini (A17 Pro)	October 15, 2024	iPadOS 18.0	October 23, 2024	October 26, 2026	Latest iPadOS iPadOS 27.2.1	Supported; November 9, 2026	2 years
iPad (A16)	March 4, 2025	iPadOS 18.3	March 12, 2025	Current	Latest iPadOS iPadOS 27.2.1	Supported; November 9, 2026	1 year, 8 months
iPad Air (M3)	March 4, 2025	iPadOS 18.3	March 12, 2025	March 2, 2026	Latest iPadOS iPadOS 27.2.1	Supported; November 9, 2026	1 year, 8 months
iPad Pro (M5)	October 15, 2025	iPadOS 26.0	October 22, 2025	Current	Latest iPadOS iPadOS 27.2.1	Supported; November 9, 2026	1 year
iPad Air (M4)	March 2, 2026	iPadOS 26.3	March 11, 2026	Current	Latest iPadOS iPadOS 27.2.1	Supported; November 9, 2026	8 months
iPad Mini (A20 Pro)	October 26, 2026	iPadOS 27.0	November 6, 2026	Current	Latest iPadOS iPadOS 27.2.1	Supported; November 9, 2026	0 months
Legend: / Discontinued and unsupported / Discontinued and supported / Current / Upcoming

=== Cellular connectivity ===
The iPad comes in two variants: Wi-Fi only and Wi-Fi with cellular support. Unlike the iPhone, the cellular variant did not support voice calls and text messages, but only data connectivity; it also had an additional micro-SIM circuit slot attached on the side. The 3G-based iPad is compatible with any GSM carrier, unlike the iPhone which is usually sold 'locked' to specific carriers. For the first generation of iPad, cellular access from T-Mobile was limited to slower EDGE cellular speeds because T-Mobile's network at the time used different frequencies.

The second generation of iPad introduced a third tier of CDMA support from Verizon, which is available separately from the AT&T-based version. The fifth generation of iPad used a nano-SIM circuit slot, while its predecessors used micro-SIM. (Note: Attributed to multiple references:) The iPads used two frequency bands; both support the same quad-band GSM and quad-band UMTS frequencies. One supports LTE bands 4 and 17 (principally intended for use on the U.S. AT&T network), and the other supports LTE bands 1, 3, 5, 13, 25 and CDMA EV-DO Rev. A and Rev. B.

Apple extended the range of cellular compatibilities worldwide with the release of the original iPad Air and the second generation of iPad Mini, worldwide and all major carriers across North America. The iPad Air and iPad Mini come in two cellular sub-variants, all of which featured nano-SIMs, quad-band GSM, penta-band UMTS, and dual-band CDMA EV-DO Rev. A and B. One supports LTE bands 1, 2, 3, 4, 5, 7, 8, 13, 17, 18, 19, 20, 25 and 26, and the other supports LTE bands 1, 2, 3, 5, 7, 8, 18, 19, 20 and TD-LTE bands 38, 39 and 40.

== Accessories ==
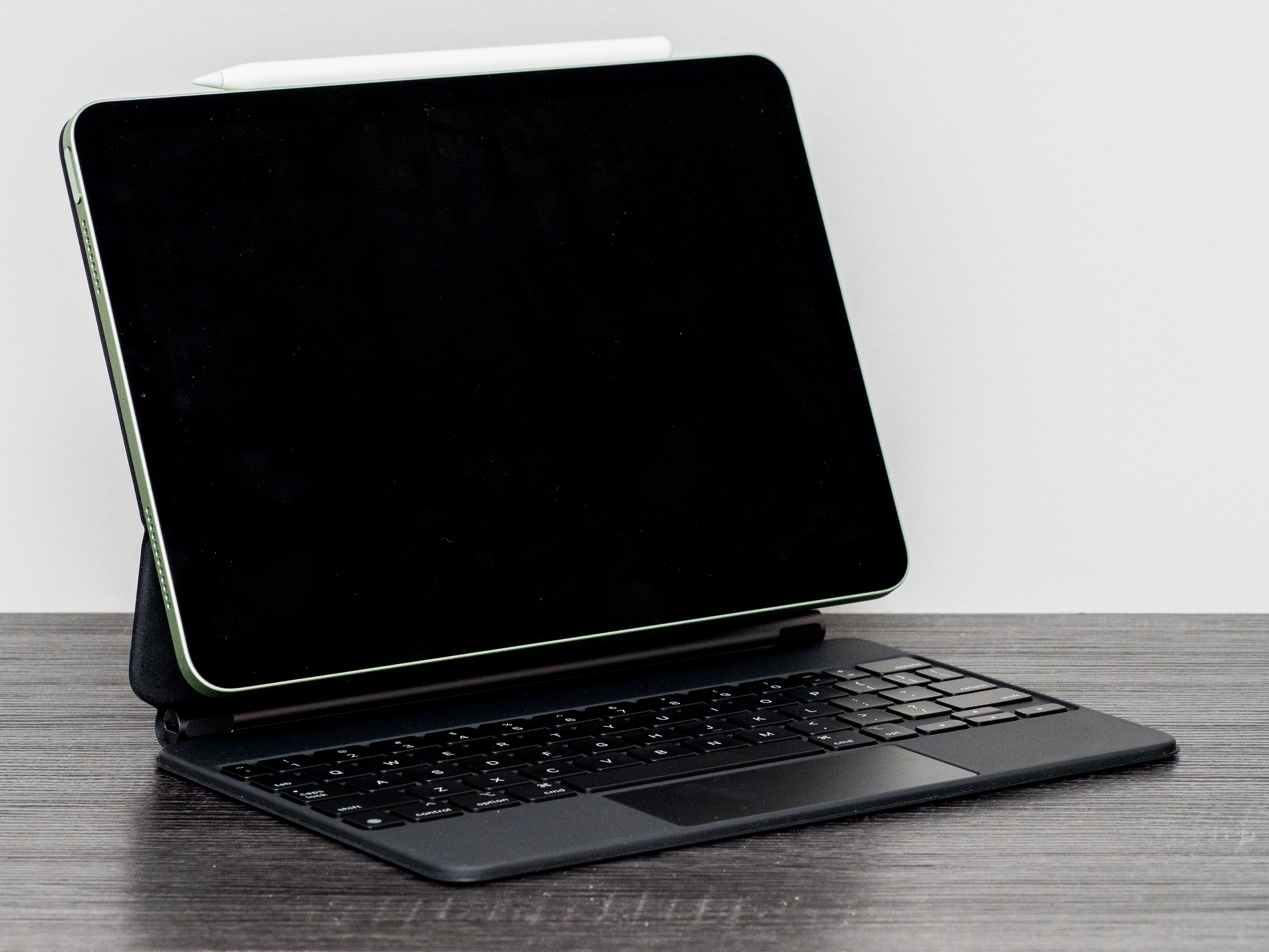
The Magic Keyboard and Apple Pencil, 2021

Apple offers many accessories for its iPad models, ranging from keyboards, styluses, cases, to adapters; a 10 W power adapter is bundled with the device. In addition to a camera connection kit which consists of two adapters for the iPad's dock connector, one of USB Type A and one of SD card reader; these adapters can transfer photographs and videos and connect USB audio card and MIDI keyboard.

Apple's list of accessories included the Apple Pencil ― a wireless stylus pen, Smart Cover ― a magnetic screen protector that align to the face of an iPad with three folds that is convertible into a stand, Smart Case ― a fine case combining the functions of a Smart Cover and a back-protection case, Smart Keyboard Folio ― an externally-paired keyboard and a combination of a Smart Case and its predecessor, a Smart Keyboard, Magic Keyboard, ― an externally-paired keyboard similar to the formers but with integrated trackpads which the Smart Keyboard Folio and Smart Keyboard lack. (Note: Attributed to multiple references:)

== Software ==
Since its introduction in 2010, the iPad runs on the iPhone's iOS mobile operating system, but it was later replaced with an optimized derivation, iPadOS, in September 2019. It shares the former's development environment and many of its applications and features. The iPad is compatible with nearly every iPhone application through iOS, and developers can optimize these applications to take full advantage of the iPad's software. They used iOS SDK, a software development kit. (Note: Attributed to multiple references:)

The iOS user interface is based upon direct manipulation, using multi-touch gestures such as swipe, tap, pinch, and reverse pinch. Interface control elements include sliders, switches, and buttons. Internal accelerometers are used by some applications to respond to shaking the device (one common result is the undo command) or rotating it in three dimensions (one common result is switching between portrait and landscape mode). Various accessibility described in § Accessibility functions enable users with vision and hearing disabilities to properly use iOS.

iOS devices boot to the homescreen, the primary navigation and information "hub" on iOS devices, analogous to the desktop found on personal computers. iOS homescreens are typically made up of app icons and widgets; app icons launch the associated app, whereas widgets display live, auto-updating content, such as a weather forecast, the user's email inbox, or a news ticker directly on the homescreen. Along the top of the screen is a status bar, showing information about the device and its connectivity. The status bar itself contains two elements, the Control Center and the Notification Center.

iOS' Control Center can be "pulled" down from the top right of the notch, giving access to various toggles to manage the device more quickly without having to open the Settings. It is possible to manage brightness, volume, wireless connections, music player, etc. A homescreen may be made up of several pages, between which the user can swipe back and forth, one of the ways to do this is to hold down on the "dots" shown on each page and swipe left or right. To the right of the last page, the App Library lists and categorizes apps installed on the device. Apps within each category are arranged based on the frequency of their usage. In addition to a category for suggested apps, a "recent" category lists apps recently installed alongside App Clips recently accessed. Users can search for the app they want or browse them in alphabetical order.

iOS' multitasking API included Background audio – application continues to run in the background as long as it is playing audio or video content, voice over IP – application is suspended when a phone call is not in progress, Push notification, Local notifications – application schedules local notifications to be delivered at a predetermined time, Task completion – application asks the system for extra time to complete a given task, Fast app switching – application does not execute any code and may be removed from memory at any time, Newsstand – applications can download content in the background to be ready for the uses, External Accessory – application communicates with an external accessory and shares data at regular intervals, Bluetooth Accessory – application communicates with a Bluetooth accessory and shares data at regular intervals, and Background application update.

iPadOS features a multitasking system developed with more capabilities compared to iOS, with features like Slide Over and Split View that make it possible to use multiple different applications simultaneously. Double-clicking the Home Button or swiping up from the bottom of the screen and pausing will display all currently active spaces. Each space can feature a single app, or a Split View featuring two apps. The user can also swipe left or right on the Home Indicator to go between spaces at any time, or swipe left/right with four fingers.

In iPadOS, while using an app, swiping up slightly from the bottom edge of the screen will summon the Dock, where apps stored within can be dragged to different areas of the current space to be opened in either Split View or Slide Over. Dragging an app to the left or right edge of the screen will create a Split View, which will allow both apps to be used side by side. The size of the two apps in Split View can be adjusted by dragging a pill-shaped icon in the center of the vertical divider and dragging the divider all the way to one side of the screen closes the respective app. If the user drags an app from the dock over the current app, it will create a floating window called Slide Over which can be dragged to either the left or right side of the screen. A Slide Over window can be hidden by swiping it off the right side of the screen, and swiping left from the right edge of the screen will restore it. Slide Over apps can also be cycled between by swiping left or right on the Home Indicator in the Slide Over window and pulling up on it will open an app switcher for Slide Over windows. A pill-shaped icon at the top of apps in Split View or Slide Over allows them to be switched in an out of Split View and Slide Over.

== Restrictions ==
=== Digital rights management ===
The iPad does not employ digital rights management (DRM), but the OS prevents users from copying or transferring certain content outside of Apple's platform without authorization, such as TV shows, movies, and apps. Also, the iPad's development model requires anyone creating an app for the iPad to sign a non-disclosure agreement and pay for a developer subscription. Critics argue Apple's centralized app approval process and control of the platform itself could stifle software innovation. Of particular concern to digital rights advocates is Apple's ability to remotely disable or delete apps on any iPad at any time.

Digital rights advocates, including the Free Software Foundation, Electronic Frontier Foundation, and computer engineer and activist Brewster Kahle, have criticized the iPad for its digital rights restrictions.

In an article published by NPR in April 2010, Laura Sydell, concluded that "as more consumers have fears about security on the Internet, viruses, and malware, they may be happy to opt for Apple's gated community."

In 2014, the Russian government switched from iPads to Android devices over security concerns.

=== Jailbreaking ===
Like other iOS devices, the iPad can be "jailbroken", but jailbreaking is considered to have taken a decline, with it being possible primarily on IOS devices released before 2023. Publicly available jailbreaks only work on specific devices using IOS 26 or below. But once an iPad is jailbroken, users are able to download many applications previously unavailable through the App Store via unofficial installers such as Cydia, as well as illegally pirated applications. Apple claims jailbreaking "can" void the factory warranty on the device in the United States even though jailbreaking is legal. The iPad, released in April 2010, was first jailbroken in May 2010 with the Spirit jailbreak for iOS version 3.1.2. The iPad can be jailbroken on iOS versions 4.3 through 4.3.3 with the web-based tool JailbreakMe 3.0 (released in July 2011), and on iOS versions including 5.0 and 5.0.1 using redsn0w. Absinthe 2.0 was released on May 25, 2012, as the first jailbreak method for all iOS 5.1.1 devices except the 32 nm version of the iPad 2.

=== Censorship ===
Apple's App Store, which provides iPhone and iPad applications, imposes censorship of content, which has become an issue for book publishers and magazines seeking to use the platform. The British newspaper The Guardian described the role of Apple as analogous to that of British magazine distributor WHSmith, which for many years imposed content restrictions.

Due to the exclusion of pornography from the App Store, pornography companies changed their software to produce content designed specifically for the iPad. In an e-mail exchange with Ryan Tate from Valleywag, Steve Jobs claimed that the iPad offers "freedom from porn", leading to many upset replies including Adbustings in Berlin by artist Johannes P. Osterhoff and in San Francisco during WWDC10.

== Original reception ==
Media reaction to the original iPad was mixed. The media noted the positive response from fans of the device, with thousands of people queued on the first day of sale in a number of these countries.

The iPad was quickly successful and sold in large numbers after its 2010 launch. Analysts have noted that while Apple's previous iPod and iPhone launches took some time till taking off, the iPad was commercially popular from the beginning and faced little market competition during its first year.

=== Reaction to the announcement ===
Media reaction to the announcement of the original iPad was mixed. Walter Mossberg wrote, "It's about the software, stupid", meaning hardware features and build are less important to the iPad's success than software and user interface, his first impressions of which were largely positive. Mossberg also called the price "modest" for a device of its capabilities, and praised the ten-hour battery life. Others, including PC Advisor and the Sydney Morning Herald, wrote that the iPad would also compete with proliferating netbooks, most of which use Microsoft Windows. The base model's $499 price was lower than pre-release estimates by the tech press, Wall Street analysts, and Apple's competitors, all of whom were expecting a much higher entry price point.

CNET also criticized the iPad for its apparent lack of wireless sync which other portable devices such as Microsoft's Zune have had for a number of years. The built-in iTunes app is able to download from the Internet as well.

=== Critical response ===
Reviews of the original iPad have been generally favorable. Walt Mossberg, then of The Wall Street Journal, called it a "pretty close" laptop killer. David Pogue of The New York Times wrote a "dual" review, one part for technology-minded people, and the other part for non-technology-minded people. In the former section, he notes that a laptop offers more features for a cheaper price than the iPad. In his review for the latter audience, however, he claims that if his readers like the concept of the device and can understand what its intended uses are, then they will enjoy using the device. PC Magazine's Tim Gideon wrote, "you have yourself a winner" that "will undoubtedly be a driving force in shaping the emerging tablet landscape." Michael Arrington of TechCrunch wrote, "the iPad beats even my most optimistic expectations. This is a new category of device. But it also will replace laptops for many people." PC World criticized the iPad's file sharing and printing abilities, and Ars Technica stated that sharing files with a computer is "one of our least favorite parts of the iPad experience."

The media also praised the quantity of applications, as well as the bookstore and other media applications. In contrast they criticized the iPad for being a closed system and mentioned that the iPad faces competition from Android-based tablets, that outsold iPads in 2013, surpassing iPads in the second quarter of 2013, and have overtaken iPad's installed base, and has lost majority of web browsing to Android, by StatCounter estimates, in South America, Africa, most of Asia – many large countries there and in Eastern Europe. The Independent criticized the iPad for not being as readable in bright light as paper but praised it for being able to store large quantities of books. After its UK release, The Daily Telegraph said the iPad's lack of Adobe Flash support was "annoying."

=== Recognition ===
The original iPad was selected by Time magazine as one of the 50 Best Inventions of the Year 2010, while Popular Science chose it as the top gadget behind the overall "Best of What's New 2010" winner Groasis Waterboxx.

== Usage ==
=== Market share ===
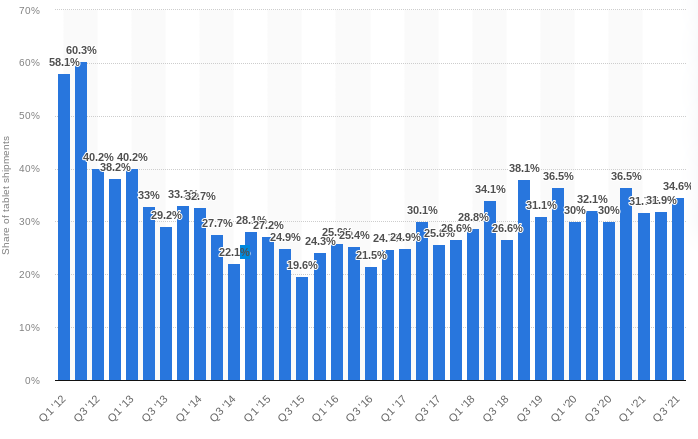
Market share of the iPad, 2012―2021

The iPad had a relatively stable tablet global market share. It received a significant drop in the third quarter of 2012 but gradually recovered, although not as abundant as before. As of the third quarter of 2021, it had a market share of 34.6%.

=== Business ===
While the iPad is mostly used by consumers, it also has been taken up by business users. Within 90 days of its release, the iPad managed to penetrate 50% of Fortune 100 companies. Some companies are adopting iPads in their business offices by distributing or making available iPads to employees. Examples of uses in the workplace include attorneys responding to clients, medical professionals accessing health records during patient exams, and managers approving employee requests.

A survey by Frost & Sullivan shows that iPad usage in office workplaces is linked to the goals of increased employee productivity, reduced paperwork, and increased revenue. The research firm estimates that "The mobile-office application market in North America may reach $6.85 billion in 2015, up from an estimated $1.76 billion [in 2010]."

Since March 2011, the US Federal Aviation Administration (FAA) has approved the iPad for in-cockpit use to cut down on the paper consumption in several airlines. In 2011, Alaska Airlines became the first airline to replace pilots' paper manuals with iPads, weighing 680 g (1.50 lb) compared to 11 kg (24 lb) for the printed flight manuals. It hopes to have fewer back and muscle injuries. More than a dozen airlines have followed suit, including United, which has distributed 11,000 iPads to cockpits. Many airlines also now offer their inflight magazine as a downloadable application for the iPad.

=== Education and healthcare ===
The iPad has several uses in the classroom, and has been praised as a valuable tool for homeschooling and distance education. Soon after the iPad was released, it was reported that 81% of the top book apps were for children. In 2025, the use of iPads for notetaking in classroom settings was steadily replacing alternative methods, including traditional pen-and-paper. The iPad has also been called a revolutionary tool to help children with autism learn how to communicate and socialize more easily.

In the healthcare field, iPads and iPhones have been used to help hospitals manage their supply chain. For example, Novation, a healthcare contracting services company, developed VHA PriceLynx (based on the mobile application platform of business intelligence software vendor MicroStrategy), a business intelligence app to help health care organizations manage its purchasing procedures more efficiently and save money for hospitals. Guillermo Ramas of Novation states, "Doctors won't walk around a hospital with a laptop. With an iPad it's perfect to walk around the hospital with as long as they have the information they need."

In 2013, Gianna Chien (aged 14) presented to more than 8,000 doctors at the Heart Rhythm Society meeting that the Apple iPad 2 can, in some cases, interfere with life-saving heart devices (pacemakers) because of the magnets inside. The iPad User Guide advised pacemaker users to keep iPads at least 6 in (15 cm) away from a pacemaker. A study in 2014 found that the iPad 2 could cause electromagnetic interference (EMI) in implantable cardioverter defibrillators.

=== Consumer usage ===
In the United States, fans attending Super Bowl XLV, the first Super Bowl since the iPad was released, could use an official National Football League (NFL) app to navigate Cowboys Stadium. In 2011, the Tampa Bay Buccaneers became the first NFL club to discontinue the use of paper copies of playbooks, and instead distributed all players their playbook and videos in electronic format via an iPad 2.

The iPad is able to support many music creation applications in addition to the iTunes music playback software. These include sound samplers, guitar and voice effects processors, sequencers for synthesized sounds and sampled loops, virtual synthesizers and drum machines, theremin-style and other touch responsive instruments, drum pads and many more. Gorillaz's 2010 album, The Fall, was created almost exclusively using the iPad by Damon Albarn while on tour with the band. The music video for Luna Sea's 2012 single, "Rouge", was filmed entirely on an iPad.

Due to its popularity, the term "iPad" is occasionally used as a generic name for tablet computers. However, it was suggested that Apple would attempt to prevent the term from being used in this fashion.

== Timeline ==
Timeline of iPad models
See also: List of Apple products

Source: Apple Newsroom Archive.

== See also ==
- List of Apple Inc. media events
- Comparison of e-readers
- Comparison of tablet computers
- Microsoft Surface
- Pen computing
