= IPad Mini =

Small tablet computers by Apple

iPad Mini

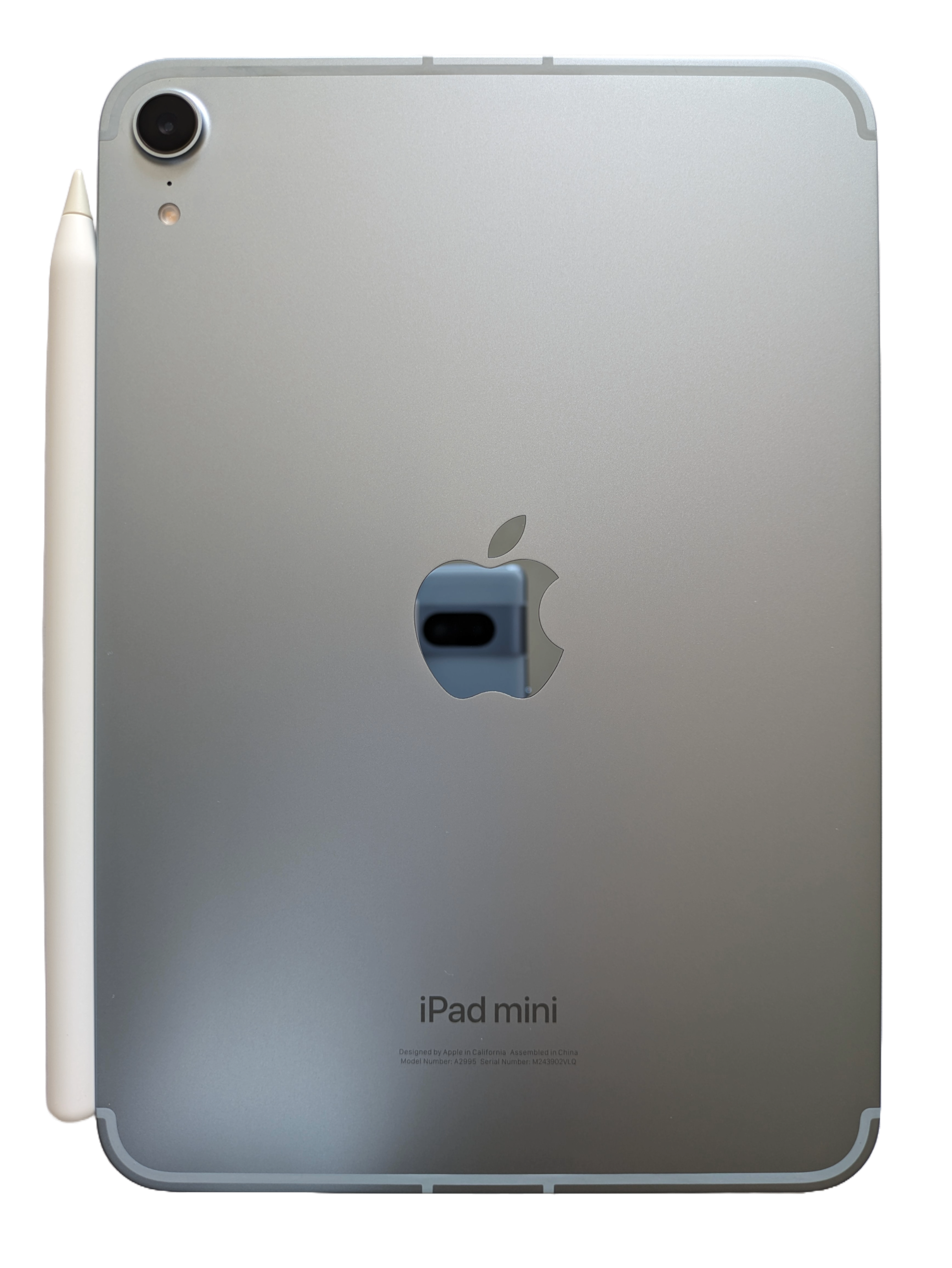
- Back of an iPad Mini (A17 Pro) with an Apple Pencil Pro attached
- Developer: Apple
- Manufacturer: Foxconn, Pegatron
- Product family: iPad
- Type: Tablet computer
- Released: November 2, 2012; 14 years ago (1st generation)
- Operating system: iOS (2012–2019) iPadOS (2019–present)
- Connectivity: Wi-Fi and cellular
- Online services: App Store, iTunes, Game Center, iCloud, FaceTime, iMessage
- Website: apple.com/ipad-mini

The iPad Mini (branded and marketed as iPad mini) is a line of small tablet computers developed and marketed by Apple. It is a sub-series of the iPad line of tablets, with screen sizes of 7.9 inches to 8.5 inches.

== History ==
On October 16, 2012, Apple announced plans for a media event on October 23 at the California Theatre in San Jose, California. The company did not give the subject of the event, but it was widely expected to be the iPad Mini.

The first-generation iPad Mini was announced on October 23, 2012, and was released on November 2, 2012, in nearly all of Apple's markets. It featured similar internal specifications to the iPad 2, including its display resolution.

The iPad Mini 2, with the A7 chip and a Retina display, was announced on October 22, 2013, and released on November 12, 2013.

The iPad Mini 3 was announced on October 16, 2014, and was released on October 22, 2014, alongside the iPad Air 2; it features the same external hardware as the Mini 2 and the addition of a Touch ID fingerprint sensor compatible with Apple Pay.

On September 9, 2015, Apple released the iPad Mini 4 which includes a more powerful A8 chip, a similar display to the iPad Air 2, and an 8 MP back camera.

On March 18, 2019, Apple released the fifth-generation iPad Mini with support for the Apple Pencil alongside the third-generation iPad Air.

The sixth-generation iPad Mini was announced on September 14, 2021, alongside the ninth-generation iPad, with both devices being released on September 24, 2021. Matching the new design language of the current Pro and Air iPads, features included a larger 8.3-inch full-screen display, USB-C port (instead of Lightning), top button with Touch ID (with home button removed), and support for the second-generation Apple Pencil.

The seventh-generation iPad Mini was announced in a press release on October 15, 2024, and released on October 23, 2024. Featuring a near identical design to the sixth-generation, this model came with a more powerful A17 Pro chipset, allowing for Apple Intelligence features with iPadOS 18. Problems with "jelly-scrolling" in the previous model had also been reduced. This model additionally supports the Apple Pencil Pro, but drops support for the second-generation Pencil due to a change in magnets.

The eighth-generation iPad Mini was announced on October 26, 2026, and was released on November 6, 2026. It features an 8.5-inch OLED display, the A20 Pro chip, and a landscape front-facing camera. The nano-texture display, previously exclusive to the iPad Pro, can also be added as an option. This generation also features the new Acoustic Display system, which uses the display to produce sound.

== Features ==
=== Software ===
The iPad Mini comes with several pre-installed applications, including Siri, Safari, Mail, Photos, Apple TV, Music, App Store, Maps, Notes, Calendar, Game Center, Photo Booth, and Contacts. Like all iOS devices, the iPad can sync content and other data with a Mac or PC using iTunes and to Apple's iCloud online service. Although the tablet is not designed to make telephone calls over a cellular network, users can use a headset or the built-in speaker and microphone and place phone calls over Wi-Fi or cellular using a VoIP application, such as Skype. iPads offer dictation when connected to a Wi-Fi or cellular network.

Applications from Apple and third-party developers can be downloaded through the App Store, an application distribution market for iOS that is maintained and regulated by Apple. The service allows users to browse and purchase applications. Optional apps from Apple that can be purchased through the App Store include GarageBand, iMovie, iPhoto, and the iWork apps (Pages, Keynote, and Numbers) are available.

The device has an optional Apple Books application, which displays books and other ePub-format content downloaded from the iBookstore. Several major book publishers including Penguin Books, HarperCollins, Simon & Schuster and Macmillan have committed to publishing books for the device. Despite the iPad being a direct competitor to both the Amazon Kindle and Barnes & Noble Nook, both Amazon.com and Barnes & Noble offer e-reader apps for the iPad.

On June 8, 2015, it was announced at the WWDC that all four generations of the iPad Mini would support iOS 9. However, certain new multitasking features, such as Slide Over and Picture in Picture, will be limited to the second, third, and fourth generation. Split View, another new multitasking feature, is available only on the iPad Mini 4.

The current version of iPadOS, iPadOS 27, is supported on the iPad Mini (6th generation) and up.

The first-generation iPad Mini shipped with iOS 6.0 and the highest supported version is iOS 9.3.6 (for cellular models) or iOS 9.3.5 (for Wi-Fi models).

=== Hardware ===
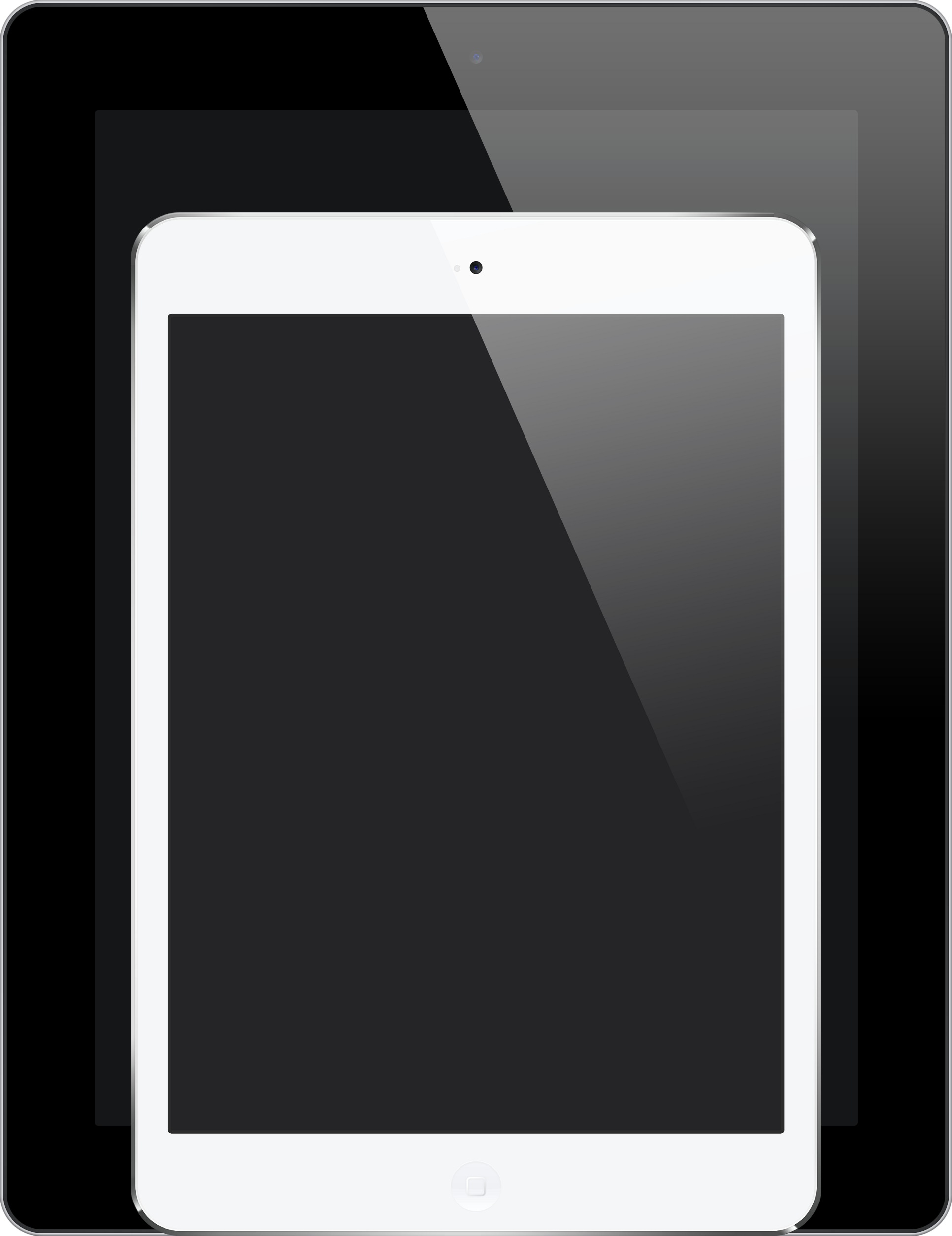
Form factor size comparison between the iPad Mini (1st to 5th generation) and iPad (3rd to 4th generation)

There are two distinct designs of the iPad Mini. The original design, used on the first- to fifth-generation models, includes four buttons and one switch, including a "home" button near the display that returns the user to the home screen, and three aluminum buttons on the right side and top: sleep/wake and volume up and volume down, plus a software-controlled switch whose function varies with software updates. The newer design, used on the sixth-generation model onwards, includes three buttons (with the home button removed) and thinner bezels. The third-generation models onwards also have Touch ID biometric authentication. The tablet is manufactured either with or without the capability to communicate over a cellular network. All models can connect to a wireless LAN via Wi-Fi. The iPad Mini is available with 128, 256, and 512 GB (Note: 1 GB = 1 billion bytes) of storage, with no expansion option. Apple sells a "camera connection kit" with an SD card reader, but it can be used only to transfer photos and videos.

The first-generation iPad Mini features partially the same hardware as the iPad 2. Both screens have resolutions of 1024 × 768, but the iPad Mini has a smaller screen and thus higher pixel density than iPad 2 (163 ppi vs. 132 ppi). Unlike the iPad 2, it has 5 MP and 1.2 MP cameras and the Lightning connector. The system-on-chip is A5, which is the same one found in the later revision of the iPad 2 (32 nm). The audio processor is the same found in iPhone 5 and iPad 4th generation, which allows the iPad Mini to have Siri and voice dictation unlike the iPad 2. The graphics processor (GPU) of the first-generation iPad Mini is the same one found in the iPad 2 (PowerVR SGX543MP2).

iPads with a data connection can download data through cellular networks but can not make voice calls. They can act as a hotspot, sharing the Internet connection over Wi-Fi, Bluetooth, or USB.

=== Accessories ===
Apple Lightning connector

The Smart Cover, introduced with the iPad 2, is a screen protector that magnetically attaches to the face of the iPad. A smaller version is now available for iPad Mini. The cover has three folds, which allow it to convert into a stand, held together by magnets. Smart Covers have a microfiber bottom that cleans the front of the iPad, and wakes up the unit when the cover is removed. It comes in six colors of polyurethane.

Apple offers other accessories, including a Bluetooth keyboard, several types of earbuds or headphones, and many adapters for the Lightning connector. AppleCare and free engraving are also available for the iPad Mini.

== Model comparison ==
The most recent model is the iPad Mini (A20 Pro). The iPad Mini models are listed in a comparison grid.

=== Support ===
Legend:	Obsolete	Vintage	Unsupported	Discontinued	Current	Upcoming

Model	Announced	Release		Discontinued	Latest release		Support lifespan
Model	Announced	OS	Date	Discontinued	OS	Date	Support lifespan
iPad Mini (1st generation)	October 23, 2012	iOS 6.0	November 2, 2012	June 19, 2015	iOS 9.3.5 iOS 9.3.6	August 25, 2016 (Wi-Fi); July 22, 2019 (Wi-Fi + Cellular)	3 years, 9 months (Wi-Fi); 6 years, 8 months (Wi-Fi + Cellular)
iPad Mini 2	October 22, 2013	iOS 7.0.3	November 12, 2013	March 21, 2017	iOS 12.5.8	January 26, 2026	12 years, 2 months
iPad Mini 3	October 16, 2014	iOS 8.1	October 22, 2014	September 9, 2015	iOS 12.5.8	January 26, 2026	11 years, 3 months
iPad Mini 4	September 9, 2015	iOS 9.0	September 9, 2015	March 18, 2019	iPadOS 15.8.8	May 11, 2026	10 years, 8 months
iPad Mini (5th generation)	March 18, 2019	iOS 12.2	March 18, 2019	September 14, 2021	iPadOS 26.7.3	November 9, 2026	7 years, 7 months
iPad Mini (6th generation)	September 14, 2021	iPadOS 15.0	September 24, 2021	October 15, 2024	iPadOS 27.2.1	November 9, 2026	5 years, 1 month
iPad Mini (A17 Pro)	October 15, 2024	iPadOS 18.0	October 23, 2024	October 26, 2026	iPadOS 27.2.1	November 9, 2026	2 years
iPad Mini (A20 Pro)	October 26, 2026	iPadOS 27.0	November 6, 2026	Current	iPadOS 27.2.1	November 9, 2026	0 months

Models	iOS version							iPadOS version							
Models	6	7	8	9	10	11	12	13	14	15	16	17	18	26	27
1st	Yes	Yes	Yes	Yes	No	No	No	No	No	No	No	No	No	No	No
2	—N/a	Yes	Yes	Yes	Yes	Yes	Yes	No	No	No	No	No	No	No	No
3	—N/a	—N/a	Yes	Yes	Yes	Yes	Yes	No	No	No	No	No	No	No	No
4	—N/a	—N/a	—N/a	Yes	Yes	Yes	Yes	Yes	Yes	Yes	No	No	No	No	No
5th	—N/a	—N/a	—N/a	—N/a	—N/a	—N/a	Yes	Yes	Yes	Yes	Yes	Yes	Yes	Yes	No
6th	—N/a	—N/a	—N/a	—N/a	—N/a	—N/a	—N/a	—N/a	—N/a	Yes	Yes	Yes	Yes	Yes	Yes
A17 Pro	—N/a	—N/a	—N/a	—N/a	—N/a	—N/a	—N/a	—N/a	—N/a	—N/a	—N/a	—N/a	Yes	Yes	Yes
A20 Pro	—N/a	—N/a	—N/a	—N/a	—N/a	—N/a	—N/a	—N/a	—N/a	—N/a	—N/a	—N/a	—N/a	—N/a	Yes

=== Models ===
Model		iPad Mini (1st generation)	iPad Mini 2	iPad Mini 3	iPad Mini 4	iPad Mini (5th generation)	iPad Mini (6th generation)	iPad Mini (A17 Pro)	iPad Mini (A20 Pro)
OS	Initial	iOS 6.0	iOS 7.0.3	iOS 8.1	iOS 9.0	iOS 12.2	iPadOS 15.0	iPadOS 18.0	iPadOS 27.0
OS	Highest supported	iOS 9.3.6	iOS 12.5.8		iPadOS 15.8.8	iPadOS 26.7.3	iPadOS 27.2.1		
Model number		A1432 (Wi-Fi); A1454 (Wi-Fi + Cellular); A1455 (Wi-Fi + Cellular)	A1489 (Wi-Fi); A1490 (Wi-Fi + Cellular); A1491 (Wi-Fi + Cellular TD-LTE)	A1599 (Wi-Fi); A1600 (Wi-Fi + Cellular); A1601 (Wi-Fi + Cellular TD-LTE)	A1538 (Wi-Fi); A1550 (Wi-Fi + Cellular)	A2133 (Wi-Fi); A2124, A2126 (Wi-Fi + Cellular); A2125 (Wi-Fi + Cellular TD-LTE)	A2567 (Wi-Fi); A2568, A2569 (Wi-Fi + Cellular)	A2993 (Wi-Fi); A2995, A2996 (Wi-Fi + Cellular)	A3595 (Wi-Fi); A3596, A3597 (Wi-Fi + Cellular)
Announcement date		October 23, 2012	October 22, 2013	October 16, 2014	September 9, 2015	March 18, 2019	September 14, 2021	October 15, 2024	October 26, 2026
Release date		November 2, 2012	November 12, 2013	October 22, 2014	16, 64, 128 GB: September 9, 2015; 32 GB: September 7, 2016	March 18, 2019	September 24, 2021	October 23, 2024	November 6, 2026
Discontinued		32, 64 GB: October 22, 2013; 16 GB: June 19, 2015	64, 128 GB: October 16, 2014; 16 GB: September 7, 2016; 32 GB: March 21, 2017	September 9, 2015	16, 64 GB: September 7, 2016; 32 GB: March 21, 2017; 128 GB: March 18, 2019	September 14, 2021	October 15, 2024	October 26, 2026	In production
Unsupported		September 13, 2016; July 22, 2019 (Wi-Fi + Cellular)	January 26, 2026		May 11, 2026	Current			
Launch price		Wi-Fi models 16 GB: $329; 32 GB: $429; 64 GB: $529 Wi-Fi + Cellular models 16 GB: $459; 32 GB: $559; 64 GB: $659	Wi-Fi models 16 GB: $399; 32 GB: $499; 64 GB: $599; 128 GB: $699 Wi-Fi + Cellular models 16 GB: $529; 32 GB: $629; 64 GB: $729; 128 GB: $829	Wi-Fi models 16 GB: $399; 32 GB: $399; 64 GB: $499; 128 GB: $599 Wi-Fi + Cellular models 16 GB: $529; 32 GB: $629; 64 GB: $629; 128 GB: $729		Wi-Fi models 64 GB: $399; 256 GB: $549 Wi-Fi + Cellular models 64 GB: $529; 256 GB: $679	Wi-Fi models 64 GB: $499; 256 GB: $649 Wi-Fi + Cellular models 64 GB: $649; 256 GB: $799	Wi-Fi models 128 GB: $499; 256 GB: $599; 512 GB: $799 Wi-Fi + Cellular models 128 GB: $649; 256 GB: $749; 512 GB: $949	Wi-Fi models 128 GB: $699; 256 GB: $799; 512 GB: $999 Wi-Fi + Cellular models 128 GB: $849; 256 GB: $949; 512 GB: $1149
SoC	Name	Apple A5	Apple A7		Apple A8	Apple A12 Bionic	Apple A15 Bionic	Apple A17 Pro	Apple A20 Pro
SoC	Motion coprocessor	—N/a	Apple M7		Apple M8	Apple A12 Bionic	Apple A15 Bionic	Apple A17 Pro	Apple A20 Pro
SoC	CPU	1 GHz dual-core ARM Cortex-A9	1.3 GHz dual-core Cyclone		1.5 GHz dual-core Typhoon	2.49 GHz 6-core (2 × high performance Vortex + 4 × high efficiency Tempest)	2.93 GHz 6-core (2 × high-performance Avalanche + 4 × high efficiency Blizzard)	3.78 GHz 6-core (2 × high-performance + 4 × high-efficiency)	4.93 GHz 5- or 6-core (2 × super + 3 or 4 × efficiency)
SoC	GPU	Dual-core PowerVR SGX543MP2	Quad-core PowerVR G6430		Quad-core PowerVR GX6450	Apple-designed 4-core GPU	Apple-designed 5-core GPU		Apple-designed 7-core GPU
SoC	Memory	512 MB DDR2 RAM	1 GB LPDDR3 RAM		2 GB LPDDR3 RAM	3 GB LPDDR4X RAM	4 GB LPDDR4X RAM	8 GB LPDDR5 RAM	12 GB LPDDR5X RAM
Storage		16, 32, or 64 GB	16, 32, 64, or 128 GB	16, 64, or 128 GB		64 or 256 GB		128, 256 or 512 GB	
Display		7.9 in (200 mm) multi-touch display with LED backlighting and a fingerprint and scratch-resistant coating					8.3 in (210 mm) multi-touch display with LED backlighting and a fingerprint and scratch-resistant coating		8.5 in (220 mm) OLED display with a fingerprint-resistant coating
Display		1024 × 768 pixels at 163 ppi	2048 × 1536 pixels at 326 ppi (Retina display)				2266 × 1488 pixels at 326 ppi (Liquid Retina display)		2316 × 1512 pixels at 326 ppi (Super Retina XDR display)
Display					Fully laminated display, antireflective coating	Fully laminated display, anti-reflective coating, 500-nits Max Brightness, Wide-Color Display (P3), True Tone display, 1.8% reflectivity			Fully laminated, antireflective coating, 600 nits max and 1200 nits peak brightness, Wide color (P3), True Tone, 2,000,000:1 contrast ratio
Display						Apple Pencil (1st gen)	Apple Pencil (2nd gen); Apple Pencil (USB-C)	Apple Pencil Pro; Apple Pencil (USB-C)	
Camera	iSight	1080p HD still and video camera 5 MP, 30fps and 5× digital zoom, geolocation			1080p HD still and video camera 8 MP, 30fps and 5× digital zoom, geolocation		4K still and video camera 12 MP, 60fps and 5× digital zoom, geolocation		
Camera	FaceTime	1.2 MP still, 720p video, geolocation				7 MP still, 1080p HD video, geolocation	12 MP still, 1080p HD video, geolocation		
Wireless	Wi-Fi	Wi-Fi 4			Wi-Fi 5		Wi-Fi 6	Wi-Fi 6E	Wi-Fi 7
Wireless	Cellular	3G transitional LTE on Cellular model				Gigabit-class LTE	5G NR		
Wireless	Cellular	Nano-SIM		Nano-SIM (supports Apple SIM)		Nano-SIM (with eSIM)		eSIM	
Wireless	Bluetooth	Bluetooth 4.0			Bluetooth 4.2	Bluetooth 5.0		Bluetooth 5.3	Bluetooth 6
Geolocation	Wi-Fi models	Wi-Fi, Apple location databases							
Geolocation	Wi-Fi + cellular models	Above plus: Assisted GPS, GLONASS, Apple databases, Cellular network							
Sensors		Accelerometer; Gyroscope; Ambient light sensor; Magnetometer		Accelerometer; Gyroscope; Ambient light sensor; Magnetometer; Touch ID	Accelerometer; Gyroscope; Ambient light sensor; Magnetometer; Touch ID; Barometer				
Battery		4440mAh lithium-polymer battery	6471mAh lithium-polymer battery		5124mAh lithium-polymer battery		5034mAh lithium-polymer battery		4900mAh lithium-polymer battery
Back color		Silver, Slate	Silver, Space Gray	Silver, Gold, Space Gray			Space Gray, Pink, Purple, Starlight	Space Gray, Blue, Purple, Starlight	Midnight, Starlight
Front color		White, Black					Black		
Dimensions	Height	199.9 mm (7.87 in)			203.2 mm (8.00 in)		195.4 mm (7.69 in)		195.3 mm (7.69 in)
Dimensions	Width	134.6 mm (5.30 in)							132.6 mm (5.22 in)
Dimensions	Depth	7.1 mm (0.28 in)			7.4 mm (0.29 in)		6.3 mm (0.25 in)		5.4 mm (0.21 in)
Weight	Wi-Fi models	0.68 lb (308 g)	0.73 lb (331 g)		0.66 lb (299 g)	0.66 lb (300 g)	0.646 lb (293 g)		0.562 lb (255 g)
Weight	Wi-Fi + Cellular models	0.688 lb (312 g)	0.752 lb (341 g)		0.67 lb (304 g)	0.68 lb (308 g)	0.655 lb (297 g)		0.58 lb (263 g)
Mechanical keys		Home button; Sleep/Wake; Volume controls; Variable (mute sound and rotation lock) function switch			Home button; Sleep/Wake; Volume controls	Home button with Touch ID; Sleep/Wake; Volume controls	Sleep/Wake with Touch ID; Volume controls		
Connector		Lightning					USB-C		
Greenhouse gas emissions		120 kg CO_{2}e	120 kg CO_{2}e	170 kg CO_{2}e	120 kg CO_{2}e	72 (originally 70) kg CO_{2}e	68 kg CO_{2}e	65 kg CO_{2}e	69 kg CO_{2}e

== Reception ==
Reviews of the first generation iPad Mini have been positive, with reviewers praising the device's size, design, and availability of applications, while criticizing its use of a proprietary power connector and its lack of expandable storage and Retina Display for the first-generation iPad Mini. The device competes with tablets such as the Amazon Kindle Fire HD, Google Nexus 7, and Barnes & Noble Nook HD. Joshua Topolsky of The Verge praised the industrial design of the iPad Mini, however panned its lack of Retina Display and price. The iPad Mini 2 was well received, praising the Retina Display and Apple A7 chip performance, with criticisms on the price increase and the quality of the camera.

== Timeline ==
Timeline of iPad models
See also: List of Apple products

Source: Apple Newsroom Archive.

== See also ==
- List of iPad models
- Comparison of:
  - E-book readers
  - Tablet computers
