= IPad Mini (A17 Pro) =

2024 tablet computer by Apple

iPad Mini (A17 Pro)

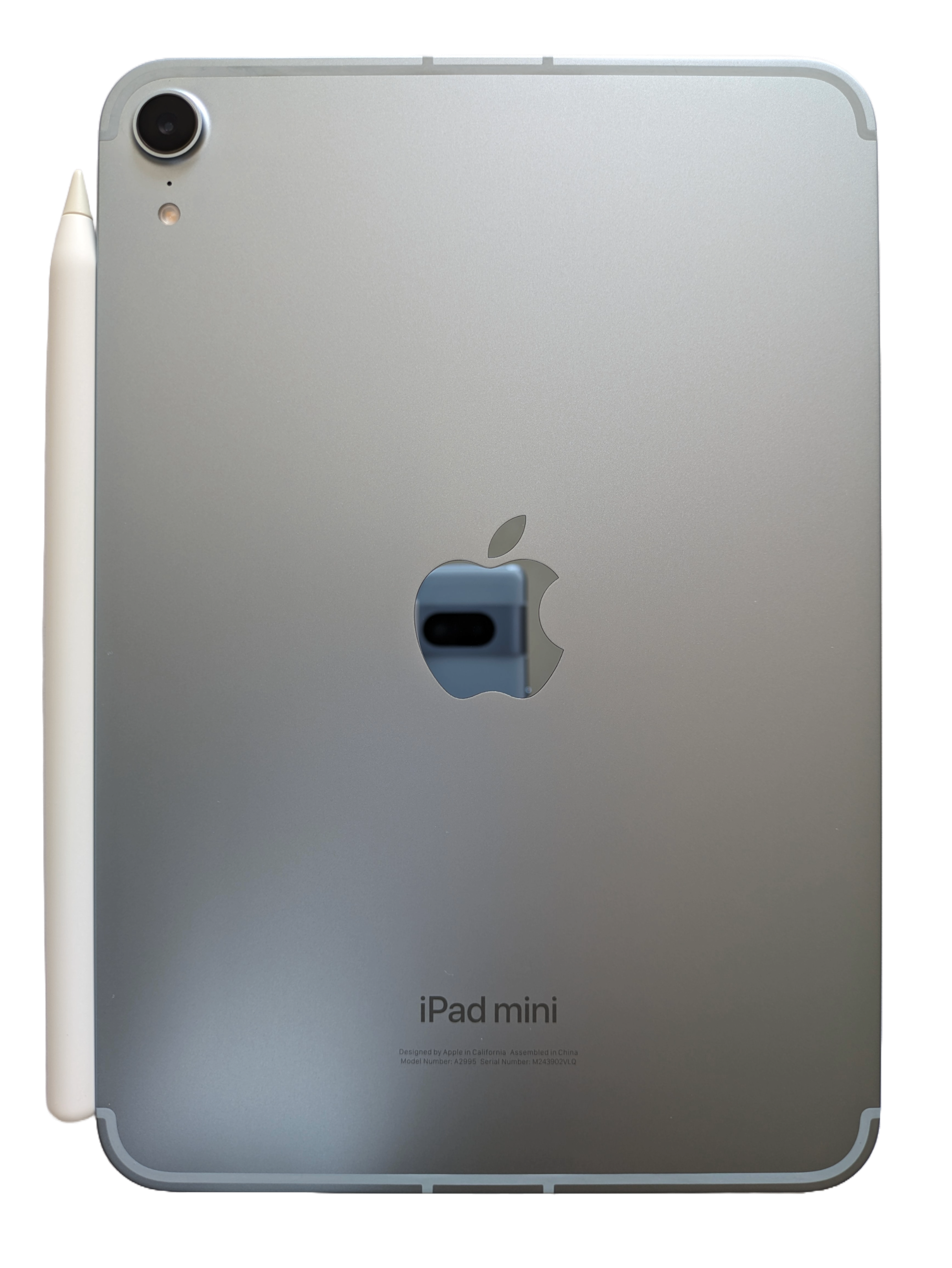
- Back of an iPad Mini (A17 Pro) with an Apple Pencil Pro attached
- Also known as: iPad mini (7th generation) iPad mini 7
- Developer: Apple
- Manufacturer: Foxconn
- Product family: iPad Mini
- Type: Tablet computer
- Generation: 7th
- Released: October 23, 2024; 2 years ago
- Introductory price: US$499 (Note: Price indicated is for the Wi-Fi–only model, with cellular the price is $599.) (Note: Price was raised to $599 for the Wi-Fi–only model ($749 with cellular) on June 25, 2026.) UK £499 (Note: Price indicated is for the Wi-Fi–only model, with cellular the price is £649.) Australia $799 (Note: Price indicated is for the Wi-Fi–only model, with cellular the price is $1049.)
- Discontinued: October 26, 2026; 24 days ago
- Operating system: Original: iPadOS 18; Current: iPadOS 27.2.1, released November 9, 2026
- System on a chip: Apple A17 Pro
- CPU: Hexa-core (2× 3.78 GHz and 4× 2.11 GHz)
- Memory: 8 GB
- Storage: 128, 256 or 512 GB
- Display: 8.3 inches (210 mm) 2266×1488 px (326 ppi), 500 nits max brightness, wide-color display (P3), True Tone display, fully laminated display, 1.8% reflectivity and Apple Pencil Pro support
- Graphics: Apple-designed 5-core GPU
- Sound: Stereo speakers (landscape)
- Input: Multi-touch screen, proximity and ambient light sensors, 3-axis accelerometer, 3-axis gyroscope, digital compass, dual microphone, Touch ID fingerprint scanner, barometer
- Camera: Front: 12 MP, ƒ/2.4 aperture, burst mode, timer mode, exposure control, face detection, Smart HDR 4, wide-color capture, auto image stabilization, Retina flash, 1080p HD video recording Rear: 12 MP, ƒ/1.8 aperture, five-element lens, quad-LED True Tone flash, burst mode, timer mode, exposure control, noise reduction, face detection, Hybrid IR filter, Live Photos with stabilization, Autofocus with Focus Pixels, face detection, Smart HDR, panorama, wide-color capture, auto image stabilization, 4K 60 fps video recording, video stabilization, slo-mo, time-lapse
- Connectivity: Wi-Fi and Wi-Fi + Cellular: 802.11 Wi-Fi 6E dual-band (2.4 GHz, 5 GHz and 6 GHz) and MIMO Bluetooth 5.3 Wi-Fi + Cellular: GPS & GLONASS GSM UMTS / HSDPA 850, 1700, 1800, 1900 MHz LTE Multiple bands 1, 2, 3, 4, 5, 7, 8, 11, 12, 13, 14, 17, 18, 19, 20, 21, 25, 26, 29, 30, 34, 38, 39, 40, 41, 46, 48, 66, 71 5G NR Multiple bands n1, n2, n3, n5, n7, n8, n12, n20, n25, n28, n29, n30, n38, n40, n41, n48, n66, n71, n77, n78, n79
- Dimensions: 7.69 in (195 mm) (height); 5.31 in (135 mm) (width); 0.25 in (6.4 mm) (depth)
- Weight: Wi-Fi models 0.65 pound (293 grams) Wi-Fi + Cellular models 0.66 pound (297 grams)
- Predecessor: iPad Mini (6th generation)
- Successor: IPad Mini (A20 Pro)
- Related: iPad Air (M2)
- Website: www.apple.com/ipad-mini/

The seventh-generation iPad Mini (stylized and marketed as iPad mini (A17 Pro) and colloquially referred to as iPad Mini 7) is a tablet computer in the iPad Mini line, developed and marketed by Apple Inc. It was announced on October 15, 2024, and released on October 23, 2024. Its predecessor, the sixth-generation iPad Mini, was discontinued on the same day. It is available in four colors: Space Gray, Starlight, Blue, and Purple.

The seventh-generation iPad mini shares the same design to the sixth-generation iPad Mini, but features an upgraded processor, improved connectivity features, and support for the Apple Pencil Pro.

The iPad Mini (A17 Pro) was discontinued on October 26, 2026, with the announcement of the iPad Mini (A20 Pro).

== Specifications ==
The seventh-generation iPad mini is powered by the A17 Pro chip, which Apple claims offers a 30% faster CPU and a 25% faster GPU compared to its predecessor, along with a neural engine that is twice as fast. This model supports new Apple Intelligence features. The base model now offers 128 gigabytes of storage, up from 64 gigabytes in the previous generation. Additionally, the device features upgraded Wi-Fi 6E capabilities and a faster USB-C port.

Color	Name
	Space Gray
	Blue
	Purple
	Starlight

== Accessories ==
The seventh-generation iPad Mini is compatible with Apple Pencil (Pro and USB-C). However, it is not compatible with the Magic Keyboard for iPad or the Smart Keyboard Folio due to its smaller form factor.

== Timeline ==
Timeline of iPad models
See also: List of Apple products

Source: Apple Newsroom Archive.
