= IPad Mini (6th generation) =

2021 tablet computer by Apple

iPad Mini (6th generation)

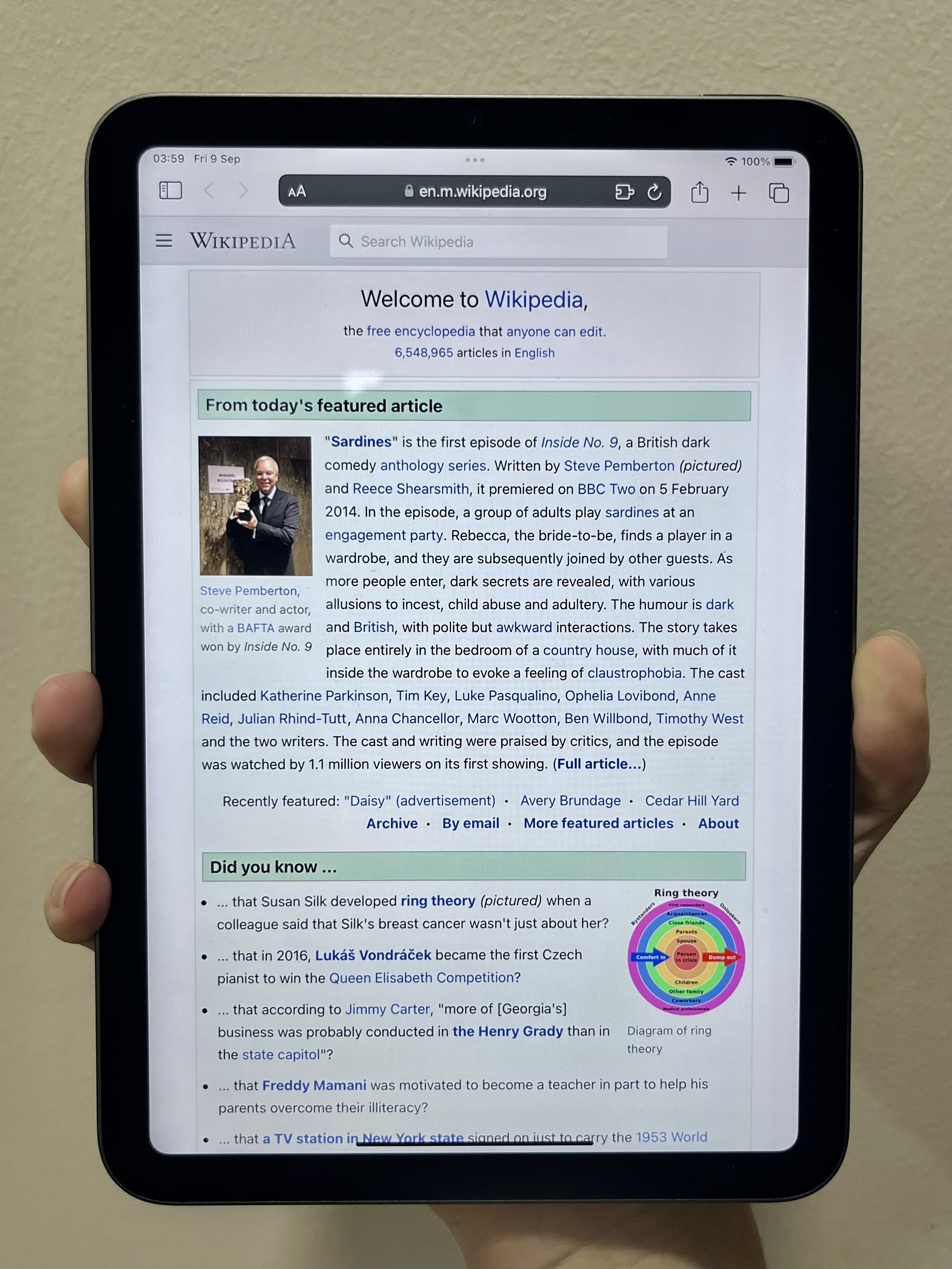
- An iPad mini (6th generation) showing the English Wikipedia main page
- Also known as: iPad mini 6
- Developer: Apple Inc.
- Manufacturer: Foxconn
- Product family: iPad Mini
- Type: Tablet computer
- Generation: 6th
- Released: September 24, 2021; 5 years ago
- Discontinued: October 15, 2024; 2 years ago
- Operating system: Original: iPadOS 15; Current: iPadOS 27.2, released October 26, 2026
- System on a chip: A15 Bionic with 64-bit architecture and embedded motion co-processor
- CPU: Hexa-core (2× 2.93 GHz Avalanche and 4× 2.01 GHz Blizzard)
- Memory: 4 GB
- Storage: 64 or 256 GB
- Display: 8.3 inches (210 mm) 2266×1488 px (326 ppi), 500-nits Max Brightness, Wide-Color Display (P3), True Tone Display, Fully Laminated Display, 1.8% Reflectivity and Apple Pencil (2nd generation) support
- Graphics: Apple-designed 5 core GPU
- Sound: Stereo speakers (landscape)
- Input: Multi-touch screen, proximity and ambient light sensors, 3-axis accelerometer, 3-axis gyroscope, digital compass, dual microphone, Touch ID fingerprint scanner, barometer
- Camera: Front: 12 MP, ƒ/2.4 aperture, burst mode, timer mode, exposure control, face detection, Smart HDR 3, wide-color capture, auto image stabilization, Retina flash, 1080p HD video recording Rear: 12 MP, ƒ/1.8 aperture, five-element lens, quad-LED True Tone flash, burst mode, timer mode, exposure control, noise reduction, face detection, Hybrid IR filter, Live Photos with stabilization, Autofocus with Focus Pixels, face detection, Smart HDR, panorama, wide-color capture, auto image stabilization, 4K 60fps video recording, video stabilization, slo-mo, time-lapse
- Connectivity: Wi-Fi and Wi-Fi + Cellular: 802.11 Wi-Fi 6 dual-band (2.4 GHz & 5 GHz) and MIMO Bluetooth 5.0 Wi-Fi + Cellular: GPS & GLONASS GSM UMTS / HSDPA 850, 1700, 1800, 1900 MHz LTE Multiple bands 1, 2, 3, 4, 5, 7, 8, 11, 12, 13, 14, 17, 18, 19, 20, 21, 25, 26, 29, 30, 34, 38, 39, 40, 41, 46, 48, 66, 71 5G NR Multiple bands n1, n2, n3, n5, n7, n8, n12, n20, n25, n28, n29, n30, n38, n40, n41, n48, n66, n71, n77, n78, n79
- Power: 3.82 V 19.19 W·h (5034 mA·h)
- Dimensions: 7.69 in (195 mm) (height); 5.31 in (135 mm) (width); 0.25 in (6.4 mm) (depth)
- Weight: Wi-Fi models 0.65 pound (293 grams) Wi-Fi + Cellular models 0.66 pound (297 grams)
- Predecessor: iPad Mini (5th generation)
- Successor: iPad Mini (7th generation)
- Related: iPad Air (4th generation) iPad (9th generation)
- Website: https://www.apple.com/ipad-mini/

The sixth-generation iPad Mini (stylized and marketed as iPad mini and colloquially referred to as iPad Mini 6) is a tablet computer in the iPad Mini line, developed and marketed by Apple Inc. It was announced on September 14, 2021, and released on September 24, 2021, alongside the ninth-generation iPad, iPhone 13 and iPhone 13 Pro. Its predecessor, the fifth-generation iPad Mini, was discontinued on the same day. It is available in four colors: Space Gray, Starlight, Pink, and Purple.

It is the first major redesign of the iPad Mini, and resembles the fourth-generation iPad Air in design and with Touch ID on the power button (removing the home button), with a larger 8.3-inch display, USB-C port (replacing the Lightning port), and support for the second-generation Apple Pencil.

The iPad Mini 6 was discontinued on October 15, 2024, with the announcement of the iPad Mini (A17 Pro).

Color	Name
	Space Gray
	Pink
	Purple
	Starlight

== Features ==
=== Hardware ===
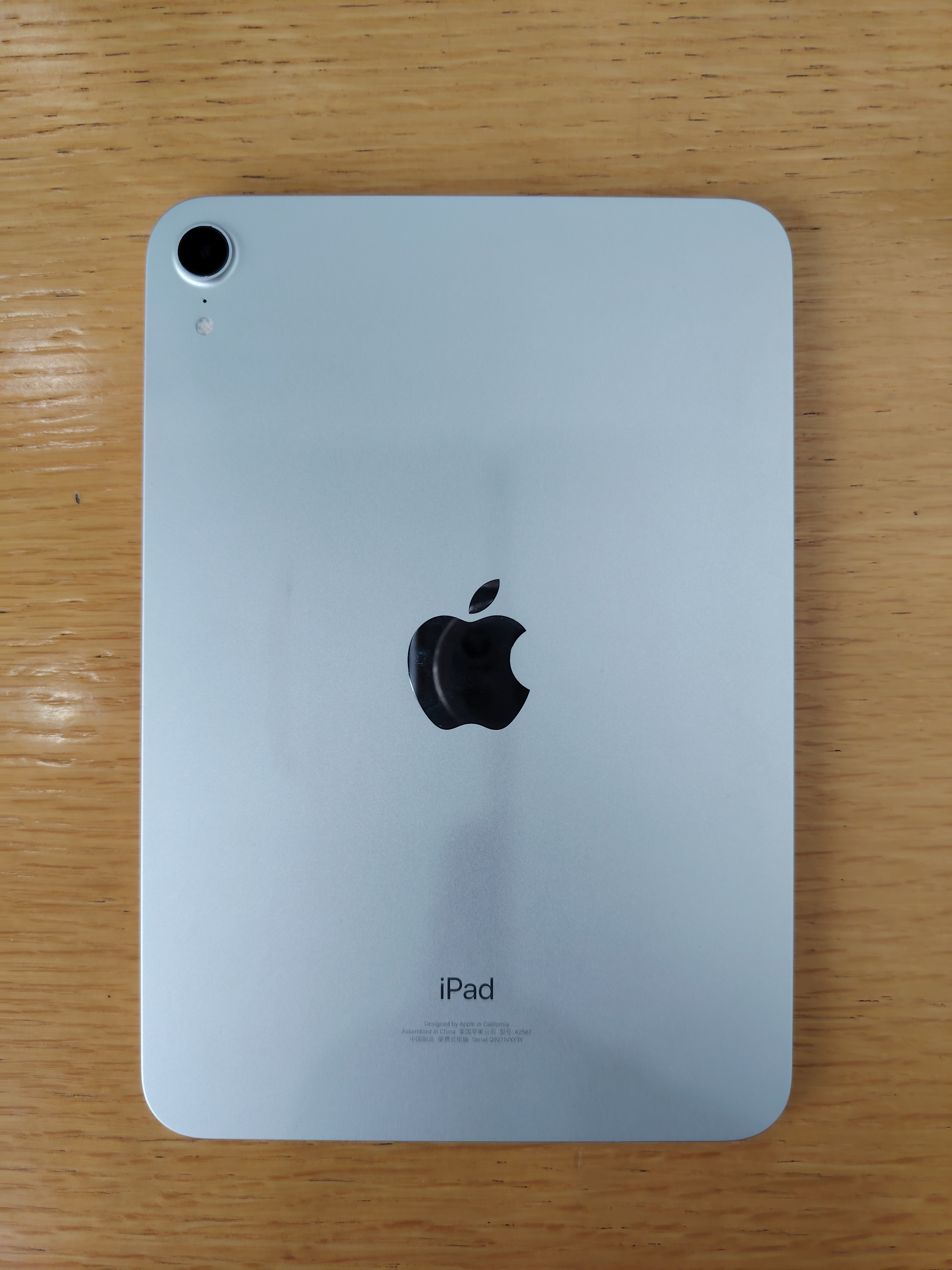
The back side of the iPad mini (6th generation). The rear camera features a True Tone flash.

It is the first redesign of the iPad Mini since the iPad Mini 4 in 2015, and the first major redesign since its introduction in 2012. Externally, it is essentially a smaller version of the 4th-generation iPad Air and third-generation and newer iPad Pro. It lacks a Smart Connector for a keyboard, likely due to its smaller size. Internally, it has an A15 Bionic SoC which is underclocked to 2.92 GHz instead of the iPhone models' 3.23 GHz. The chip has a six-core CPU, a 5-core GPU, and a 16-core Neural Engine.

It has an 8.3-inch 2266x1488 Liquid Retina display, taller and slightly narrower than previous models while maintaining the pixel density of 326 PPI, which is the same on all iPhones with Retina LCDs since the iPhone 4, excluding the Plus models. The display has wide color and True Tone. A 12 MP front camera was implemented in the iPad, replacing the older 7 MP camera, and features the Center Stage technology that detects the user and moves the camera view accordingly during video recording and video calls using on-device processing, while the rear camera is upgraded to 12 MP with a True Tone flash and 4K video recording at up to 60fps, replacing the 8 MP camera, which the module is identical to the third-generation iPad Pro.

The Home Button is removed, with the Touch ID sensor relocated to the Sleep/Wake button. The volume control buttons have been moved to the top edge of the device to accommodate the second-generation Apple Pencil. Landscape stereo audio effect is also added to the system's audio recording system.

=== Connectivity ===
The sixth-generation iPad Mini discontinues the proprietary Lightning port in favor of a universal USB-C port that is used for charging as well as connecting external devices and accessories. All models have Bluetooth 5.0 and Wi-Fi 6 (802.11ax) wireless capabilities while the cellular models support 5G connectivity but lack mmWave support unlike the iPad Pro (5th generation).

== Accessories ==
The sixth-generation iPad Mini is compatible with Apple Pencil (2nd generation and USB-C), but not with Magic Keyboard for iPad or the Smart Keyboard Folio due to its smaller form factor.

== Reception ==
This model received a very positive reception, noting a new design was long overdue and felt 5G was a nice surprise, with Jason Perlow from ZDNET calling it "Apple's most exciting new product in years".

== Timeline ==
Timeline of iPad models
See also: List of Apple products

Source: Apple Newsroom Archive.

Preceded by iPad Mini (5th generation)	iPad Mini (6th generation); 2021	Succeeded by iPad Mini (7th generation)
