= IPad Mini (A20 Pro) =

2026 tablet computer developed by Apple

iPad Mini (A20 Pro)

- Also known as: iPad mini (8th generation)
- Developer: Apple Inc.
- Manufacturer: Foxconn
- Product family: iPad Mini
- Type: Tablet computer
- Generation: 8th
- Released: November 6, 2026; 9 days ago
- Introductory price: US$699
- Operating system: Original: iPadOS 27.2; Current: iPadOS 27.2.1, released November 9, 2026
- System on a chip: Apple A20 Pro
- Memory: 12 GB
- Storage: 128, 256 or 512 GB
- Display: 8.5 inches (220 mm) 2316×1512 px (326 ppi), 600 nits max brightness, 1200 nits peak brightness, wide-color display (P3), True Tone display, fully laminated display, nano-texture glass (256 and 512 GB models)
- Sound: Stereo speakers (landscape)
- Input: Multi-touch screen, proximity and ambient light sensors, 3-axis accelerometer, 3-axis gyroscope, digital compass, dual microphone, Touch ID fingerprint scanner, barometer
- Camera: Front: 12 MP, ƒ/2.4 aperture, burst mode, timer mode, exposure control, face detection, Smart HDR 4, wide-color capture, auto image stabilization, Retina flash, 1080p HD video recording Rear: 12 MP, ƒ/1.8 aperture, five-element lens, quad-LED True Tone flash, burst mode, timer mode, exposure control, noise reduction, face detection, Hybrid IR filter, Live Photos with stabilization, Autofocus with Focus Pixels, face detection, Smart HDR, panorama, wide-color capture, auto image stabilization, 4K 60fps video recording, video stabilization, slo-mo, time-lapse
- Connectivity: Wi-Fi and Wi-Fi + Cellular: 802.11 Wi-Fi 7 dual-band (2.4 GHz, 5 GHz and 6 GHz) and MIMO Bluetooth 6 Wi-Fi + Cellular: GPS & GLONASS GSM UMTS / HSDPA 850, 1700, 1800, 1900 MHz LTE Multiple bands 1, 2, 3, 4, 5, 7, 8, 11, 12, 13, 14, 17, 18, 19, 20, 21, 25, 26, 29, 30, 34, 38, 39, 40, 41, 46, 48, 66, 71 5G NR Multiple bands n1, n2, n3, n5, n7, n8, n12, n20, n25, n28, n29, n30, n38, n40, n41, n48, n66, n71, n77, n78, n79
- Dimensions: 7.69 in (195 mm) (height); 5.22 in (133 mm) (width); 0.21 in (5.3 mm) (depth)
- Weight: Wi-Fi: 0.56 lb (250 g); Wi-Fi + Cellular: 0.58 lb (260 g)
- Predecessor: iPad Mini (A17 Pro)
- Related: iPad Air (M4)
- Website: www.apple.com/ipad-mini/

The eighth-generation iPad Mini (stylized and marketed as iPad mini (A20 Pro)) is a tablet computer in the iPad Mini line, developed and marketed by Apple. It was announced on October 26, 2026, and it was released on November 6, 2026. Its predecessor, the seventh-generation iPad Mini, was discontinued on the same day.

== Overview ==
The iPad Mini (A20 Pro) was announced on October 26, 2026, via a press release as part of Apple's three-day announcements for its "Pro and tell" event. It is the first iPad Mini with an OLED display. It also features a landscape front camera, an Acoustic Display audio system with the speakers relocated behind the display without the need for speaker holes, and IP67 water and dust resistance, being the first iPad with a water and dust resistance rating.

=== Chipset ===
The eighth-generation iPad Mini is powered by the A20 Pro chip, which Apple claims that it offers a 60% faster CPU, and up to 2.7× faster graphics performance, and up to 4.5× faster AI performance when compared to the A17 Pro on the seventh-generation iPad Mini. The 128 GB and 256 GB versions of the iPad Mini uses a five-core CPU with three efficiency cores and a 16-core neural engine, while the 512 GB version uses a six-core CPU with four efficiency cores and a dual 16-core neural engine.

=== Hardware ===
The iPad Mini supports 35 W fast charging. While it ships with a USB-C cable, the adapter is not included and must be purchased separately. The iPad Mini also supports Adaptive True Tone flash, a feature previously exclusive to the iPad Pro.

=== Display ===
The iPad Mini uses an 8.5-inch OLED-based Super Retina XDR display, with a resolution of 2316 × 1512 pixels. However, it retains a 60 Hz display. On models with 256 GB or 512 GB of storage, the iPad Mini has options for a nano-texture display, which was previously only used on the iPad Pro.

=== Software ===
The iPad Mini ships with iPadOS 27.2 with support for extended display mode while connected to an external display.

== Design ==
The eighth-generation iPad Mini has a thinner design at 5.4 mm, compared to 6.3 mm on the seventh-generation iPad Mini. It is also lighter at 0.56 pounds (254 g), surpassing the previous generation at 0.65 pounds (295 g). The eighth-generation iPad Mini is available in two colors: Midnight and Starlight.

Color	Name
	Midnight
	Starlight

== Accessories ==
The eighth-generation iPad Mini is compatible with the Apple Pencil Pro and Apple Pencil (USB-C), and it offers a TechWoven Smart Folio case.

== Release ==
The iPad Mini has a starting price of US$699. Pre-orders for the iPad Mini started on October 28, 2026, followed by the release on November 6, 2026.

== Timeline ==
Timeline of iPad models
See also: List of Apple products

Source: Apple Newsroom Archive.
