= IPadOS 26 =

2025 tablet operating system by Apple

iPadOS 26
- Version of the iPadOS operating system

- iPadOS 26 running on a 12.9-inch iPad Pro
- Developer: Apple
- Source model: Closed with open-source components
- General availability: September 15, 2025; 13 months ago
- Latest release: 26.7.3 (November 9, 2026; 1 day ago) [±]
- Marketing target: iPads
- Available in: 42 languages
- List of languages Arabic, Bulgarian, Catalan, Chinese Simplified, Chinese Traditional (Hong Kong), Chinese Traditional (Taiwan), Croatian, Czech, Danish, Dutch, English (Australia), English (United Kingdom), English (United States), Finnish, French (Canada), French (France), German, Greek, Hebrew, Hindi, Hungarian, Indonesian, Italian, Japanese, Kazakh, Korean, Lithuanian, Malay, Norwegian, Polish, Portuguese (Brazil), Portuguese (Portugal), Romanian, Russian, Slovak, Slovenian, Spanish (Latin America), Spanish (Spain), Swedish, Thai, Turkish, Ukrainian, Vietnamese
- Default user interface: Liquid Glass
- Preceded by: iPadOS 18
- Succeeded by: iPadOS 27
- Official website: iPadOS 26 at the Wayback Machine (archived June 7, 2026)
- Tagline: Work. Flows.

Support status
- Receiving security updates, with OTA for all iPads and IPSW only for iPads that are not supported by iPadOS 27. Widespread third-party software support.

Articles in the series

iPadOS 26 is the seventh major release of Apple's iPadOS operating system for the iPad. It was announced at WWDC 2025 on June 9, 2025, and released on September 15, 2025. The direct successor to iPadOS 18, it was announced alongside iOS 26, macOS 26, watchOS 26, visionOS 26, and tvOS 26—all of which introduced the "Liquid Glass" design language. Apple advanced the version number to 26 as part of a shift to a year-based versioning convention across its operating systems.

== New features and changes ==
=== Design language ===
iPadOS 26 introduced a new design language known as Liquid Glass, marking the first major design change since iOS 7. UI elements feature refraction and reflection, similar to visionOS. It now resembles macOS more due to it.

=== Multitasking ===
A redesigned optional windowing system replaced the Split View and Slide Over introduced in iOS 9, creating a similar experience to macOS. Apps are freely resizable, with "traffic light" controls akin to macOS that let a user minimize, close, or make an app full-screen. Window tiling options are also available when flicking windows to the edges of the display or using new tiling options.

The updated system is powered by a new windowing engine that optimizes window rendering by analyzing which windows are being actively used. This enables the new windowing system on all iPads that support iPadOS 26, while also allowing more windows on the screen at once.

Due to being revamped to use the same internal architecture, the existing Stage Manager is now supported on all iPads running iPadOS 26, rather than only on the A12X, A12Z and M-series iPad Pro models, and M-series iPad Air models running iPadOS 18. The windowing system occasionally exhibits behavior specific to Stage Manager, where windows may unexpectedly minimize or become inaccessible when another window is moved on-screen. As the system does not maintain stage groupings outside of Stage Manager, affected windows cannot be retrieved as a group and must be located manually.

A macOS-style menu bar is also available by swiping down on the top of the display or pushing the mouse pointer into the top of the display. If the user uses fullscreen apps rather than windowed apps or Stage Manager, the menu bar will not appear, neither will the shortcuts fly out from previous iPadOS versions. If an external display is connected and placed above the iPad display, users cannot push the mouse pointer into the top of the display, therefore requiring them to swipe down or use the keyboard shortcut. Similarly to other menus, users can type to select elements in the menu bar, but only on external displays. The traffic lights move into the menu bar if a window is in fullscreen. Toggling between a windowed and fullscreen state rapidly on an external monitor will cause the traffic lights to duplicate in the menu bar until it fills up and the system resprings.

By default, the system will add a safe area to the top of legacy applications to act as a title bar and container for the traffic lights whereas updated applications extend their interface all the way to the top border of the window with traffic lights being placed in-line. When moving a window to the top of the display, its top safe area widens to account for system elements and the menu bar. The system still hides the menu bar on external displays when a window is placed behind it. Disabling the windowing system also causes applications to still leave space reserved for the traffic lights, which are no longer available. In some versions of iPadOS 26, a bug existed that would cause apps to not exhibit a top padding at all, causing system elements to be overlaid on top of app content, including in Apple's own applications.

In iPadOS 26.1, Apple introduced Slide Over to the windowing system. Slide Over windows can be resized and placed along predefined vertically fixed points along either side of the display, they cannot be placed in the center of the display. They can also be pushed into the side of the display to hide them. It could be accessed through the traffic lights' context menu or through the menu bar. A window that is in Slide Over will always float on top of other windows and persist across stages when Stage Manager is enabled. It is denoted by a Liquid Glass backplate that extends past the window borders. This version of Slide Over does not feature an independent app switcher like previous versions, so only one window can be in Slide Over at any given time and Slide Over windows can no longer be dismissed with a trackpad gesture. If the user returns to the Home Screen and opens a window previously in Slide Over, it will remain in Slide Over. Windows can leave Slide Over by another window entering it, placing the window in fullscreen, dragging and holding it into the center of the display or the traffic lights and menu bar.

In iPadOS 26.2, Apple added new gestures to create window tiling setups by dragging app icons from the dock to either outer edge of the display to tile to half the display's size, the center of the display to open as a window or onto chevrons that appear to the left and right of the display to place a window in Slide Over. If another window is in fullscreen or filled above the dock, it will reflow to enable a tiling layout. Users can minimize one app and maximize another by dragging the divider bar all the way over, causing the minimized window to open in fullscreen the next time it is invoked. This addition is commonly referred to as the return of Split View, however, Apple does not refer to it as such as window tiling generally does not line up with Apple's definition of a Split View.

In iPadOS 26.4, Apple added gray outlines around windows should Dark Mode be enabled. These precisely follow the window's outline, which fill in corners while tiling, so the outline will extend into the rounded corners of the display found in many iPad models. However, this is not addressed in 26.5.

=== Journal ===
The Journal app, previously available only on iOS, now has a dedicated iPadOS and macOS version, with the iPadOS version having support for the Apple Pencil stylus.

=== Preview ===
iPadOS 26 now includes a Preview app, similar to its macOS counterpart, with Apple Pencil support for features such as markup.

=== Local Capture ===
iPadOS can now record high-quality video and audio streams separately while using applications like video conferencing, which can be shared or used in podcasting-editing applications. The local capture is encoded as an MP4 file, using HEVC video and FLAC audio.

== Supported devices ==
iPadOS 26 requires the A12 chip or later. It drops support for the seventh-generation iPad, which has an A10 SoC.

The third-generation iPad Air is the only supported iPad with a 10.5-inch display, while the fifth-generation iPad Mini is the only supported iPad with a 7.9-inch display. Both of these, along with the eighth-gen iPad, are the supported iPads with a white bezel that run iPadOS 26.

Certain older devices have limited features, such as Spatial Scenes requiring an Apple A14 chip or newer.

iPads that support iPadOS 26 are:

Supported device	Chipset	Release year	RAM	Apple Intelligence support
iPad (8th generation)	A12	2020	3 GB	No
iPad (9th generation)	A13	2021	3 GB	No
iPad (10th generation)	A14	2022	4 GB	No
iPad (A16)	A16	2025	6 GB	No
iPad Mini (5th generation)	A12	2019	3 GB	No
iPad Mini (6th generation)	A15	2021	4 GB	No
iPad Mini (A17 Pro)	A17 Pro	2024	8 GB	Yes
iPad Air (3rd generation)	A12	2019	3 GB	No
iPad Air (4th generation)	A14	2020	4 GB	No
iPad Air (5th generation)	M1	2022	8 GB	Yes
iPad Air (M2)	M2	2024	8 GB	Yes
iPad Air (M3)	M3	2025	8 GB	Yes
iPad Air (M4)	M4	2026	12 GB	Yes
iPad Pro 12.9-inch (3rd generation) iPad Pro 11-inch (1st generation)	A12X	2018	4 GB or 6 GB	No
iPad Pro 12.9-inch (4th generation) iPad Pro 11-inch (2nd generation)	A12Z	2020	6 GB	No
iPad Pro 12.9-inch (5th generation) iPad Pro 11-inch (3rd generation)	M1	2021	8 GB or 16 GB	Yes
iPad Pro 12.9-inch (6th generation) iPad Pro 11-inch (4th generation)	M2	2022	8 GB or 16 GB	Yes
iPad Pro (M4)	M4	2024	8 GB or 16 GB	Yes
iPad Pro (M5)	M5	2025	12 GB or 16 GB	Yes

== Version history ==
The first developer beta of iPadOS 26 was released on June 9, 2025.

iPadOS 26 releases
Version	Build	Release date	Notes
26.0	23A8330	—N/a	Preinstalled on iPad Pro (M5) models
26.0	23A341	September 15, 2025	
26.0.1	23A355	September 29, 2025	
26.0.1	23A8464	October 15, 2025	iPad Pro (M5) models only
26.0.1	23A8466	October 21, 2025	iPad Pro (M5) models only
26.1	23B85	November 3, 2025	
26.2	23C55	December 12, 2025	
26.2.1	23C71	January 26, 2026	Support for AirTag 2
26.3	23D127	February 11, 2026	
26.3	23D8128	—N/a	Preinstalled on iPad Air (M4) models
26.3.1	23D8133	March 4, 2026	
26.3.1 (a)	23D771330a	March 17, 2026	Background Security Improvement
26.4	23E246	March 24, 2026	
26.4.1	23E254	April 8, 2026	
26.4.2	23E261	April 22, 2026	
26.5	23F77	May 11, 2026	
26.5.2	23F84	June 29, 2026	
26.6	23G71	July 27, 2026	
26.6.1	23G83	August 17, 2026	
26.6.2	23G90	September 8, 2026	
26.7	23H24	September 14, 2026	OTA for all iPads, IPSW only for iPads not supported by iPadOS 27
26.7.1	23H30	September 28, 2026	OTA for all iPads, IPSW only for iPads not supported by iPadOS 27
26.7.2	23H128	October 26, 2026	OTA for all iPads, IPSW only for iPads not supported by iPadOS 27
26.7.3	23H131	November 9, 2026	OTA for all iPads, IPSW only for iPads not supported by iPadOS 27
Legend: Unsupported Latest version Preview version
