= IPad Pro =

Line of Apple tablet computers (2015–present)

iPad Pro

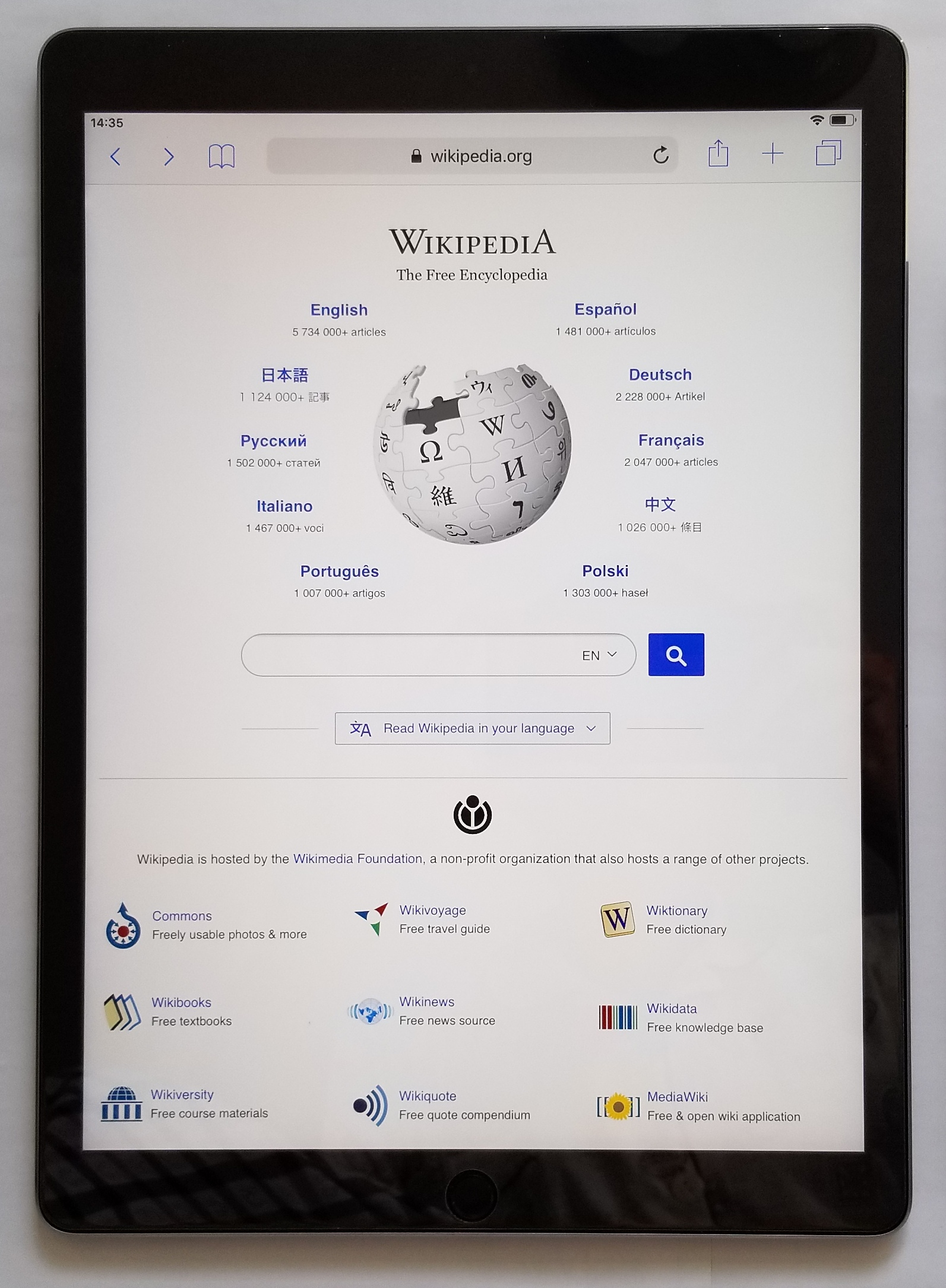
- 12.9-inch (330 mm) iPad Pro displaying the home page of Wikipedia on the Safari web browser
- Developer: Apple
- Product family: iPad
- Type: Tablet computer
- Released: November 11, 2015
- Operating system: iOS (2015–2019) iPadOS (since 2019)
- System on a chip: Apple silicon chipsets
- Storage: 32, 64, 128, 256 or 512 GB, 1 or 2 TB (Note: 1 GB = 1 billion bytes, 1 TB = 1 trillion bytes) flash memory
- Display: 12.9 in (330 mm): 2732×2048 px (264 PPI) (IPS panel) (5.5 megapixels), 12.9 in (330 mm) diagonal, 4:3 9.7 in (250 mm): 2048×1536 px (264 PPI) (IPS panel) (3.1 megapixels), 9.7 in (250 mm) diagonal, 4:3; 10.5 in (270 mm); 2224×1668 px (264 PPI) (IPS panel), 10.5 in (270 mm) diagonal, 4:3 11 in (280 mm): 2388×1668 px (264 PPI) (IPS panel), 11 in (280 mm) diagonal, 3:2
- Sound: Four speakers, adjusting sound to device orientation
- Input: Multi-touch screen, headset controls and ambient light sensors, 3-axis accelerometer, 3-axis gyroscope, digital compass, five microphones, Bosch Sensortec BMP280 barometer
- Camera: List: 12.9-inch 1st gen: 1.2 megapixels 720p front-facing and 8 megapixels rear-facing 9.7-inch: 5 megapixels 720p front-facing and 12 megapixels 4K rear-facing 12.9-inch 2nd gen and 10.5-inch: 7 megapixels 1080p front-facing and 12 megapixels 4K rear-facing, Optical & Digital Image Stabilization 12.9-inch 3rd gen and 11-inch 1st gen: 7 megapixels 1080p front-facing TrueDepth and 12 megapixels 4K rear-facing, Digital Image Stabilization 12.9-inch 4th gen and 11-inch 2nd gen: 7 megapixels 1080p front-facing TrueDepth and separate 10- and 12-megapixel 4K rear-facing, Digital Image Stabilization, LIDAR sensor 12.9-inch 5th gen and 11-inch 3rd gen: 12 megapixels 1080p front-facing TrueDepth and separate 10- and 12-megapixel 4K rear-facing, Digital Image Stabilization, LIDAR sensor 12.9-inch 6th gen and 11-inch 4th gen: 12 megapixels 1080p front-facing TrueDepth and separate 10- and 12-megapixel 4K rear-facing, Digital Image Stabilization, LIDAR sensor
- Connectivity: List: Wi-Fi and Wi-Fi + Cellular: Wi-Fi 802.11 a/b/g/n/ac; dual channel (2.4 GHz and 5 GHz); HT80 with MIMO Bluetooth 4.2 Wi-Fi + Cellular: GPS & GLONASS GSM UMTS/HSDPA 850, 900, 1700, 1900, 2100 MHz GSM/EDGE 850, 900, 1800, 1900 MHz CDMA CDMA/EV-DO Rev. A and B. 800, 1900 MHz 12.9 in (330 mm) Wi-Fi + Cellular: LTE Multiple bands 1, 2, 3, 4, 5, 7, 8, 13, 17, 18, 19, 20, 25, 26, 28, 29 and TD-LTE 38, 39, 40, 41 9.7 in (250 mm) Wi-Fi + Cellular: LTE Advanced Multiple bands 1, 2, 3, 4, 5, 7, 8, 12, 13, 17, 18, 19, 20, 25, 26, 27, 28, 29, 30 and TD-LTE 38, 39, 40, 41
- Power: Built-in rechargeable lithium-ion battery
- Online services: App Store, Apple Music, iTunes Store, iBookstore, iCloud, Game Center
- Related: Apple Pencil
- Website: apple.com/ipad-pro

The iPad Pro is a series of tablet computers, positioned as the premium line of Apple's iPad brand. Models run iPadOS, a tablet-optimized fork of the iOS operating system. Early models were distinguished from other iPads by their ability to use the Apple Pencil stylus and their larger screen size. As other iPads have gained these features over time, the latest eighth-generation iPad Pro is notable among other features for its powerful processor (the M5) and being the thinnest Apple product ever released.

The original iPad Pro was introduced in September 2015 and ran iOS 9. It had an A9X chip, and came in two sizes: 9.7-inch (250 mm) and 12.9-inch (330 mm); the 9.7-inch (250 mm) came out in March 2016. The second-generation iPad Pro was unveiled during the June 2017 WWDC event. It came with an upgraded A10X Fusion processor and superseded the 9.7-inch (250 mm) model with a 10.5-inch (270 mm) model. The third-generation iPad Pro was announced in October 2018 with a new screen design. As a part of the redesign, the home button was removed in favor of Face ID. It comes in 11-inch (280 mm) and 12.9-inch (330 mm) models.

The fourth-generation iPad Pro, introduced in March 2020, includes the A12Z chip, and was introduced alongside the Magic Keyboard for iPad. The fifth-generation iPad Pro, announced in April 2021, incorporated Apple's M1 processor, making it the first iPad model to not use an A-series processor. The sixth-generation iPad Pro was introduced in October 2022 alongside the 10th-generation iPad. It includes the M2 processor, Apple Pencil Hover, and ProRes video. The seventh-generation iPad Pro was introduced in May 2024 alongside the sixth-generation iPad Air, launching with the M4 processor, Apple Pencil Pro, a new Magic Keyboard with function keys and is the first iPad with an OLED display. The 12.9-inch (330 mm) model was replaced with a 13-inch (330 mm) model while keeping the 11-inch (280 mm) model; they would both be the same screen sizes used by every subsequent model to date.

The current eighth-generation iPad Pro was announced in October 2025 and added the M5 processor, being the first product to use the new chip alongside the 14-inch MacBook Pro and the second-generation Apple Vision Pro.

== History ==
=== First generation ===
The first generation of iPad Pro came in two sizes: 12.9-inch (330 mm) and 9.7-inch (250 mm). The 9.7 in (250 mm) version was announced on September 9, 2015 and released on November 11, 2015. It was larger than all previous iPad models, and was the first iPad to feature LPDDR4 RAM. It originally shipped with iOS 9.1. The 9.7 in (250 mm) iPad Pro was announced on March 21, 2016, and released ten days later. It was based on the form factor of the iPad Air 2 and originally shipped with iOS 9.3.

=== Second generation ===
On June 5, 2017, the second-generation iPad Pro was announced, which features A10X Fusion processors, with storage options of 64 GB, 256 GB, and 512 GB. Upgraded displays include a 10.5-inch (270 mm) version to replace the 9.7-inch (250 mm) model, while the 12.9-inch (330 mm) version was refreshed. Both sizes employed refresh rates up to 120 Hz, better HDR, and True Tone white balancing. Following this announcement, both models of the first-generation iPad Pro were discontinued. The two 2nd-generation models were the last iPad Pro models with a home button and a Lightning connector.

=== Third generation ===
The third generation of iPad Pro was announced on October 30, 2018, and was made available in two screen sizes: 11-inch (280 mm) and 12.9-inch (330 mm). They feature full-screen displays, with the 11-inch (280 mm) model replacing the 10.5 inches (270 mm) model of the previous generation. They also feature up to 1 TB of storage and Face ID using a sensor array on the top bezel which, unlike iPhone models featuring Face ID, can unlock the iPad in any orientation. The home button was completely removed in favor of a larger display and uniform bezel sizes on all sides. These were also the first iPads to come with a USB-C connector. It was launched with a Smart Keyboard Folio (sold separately), but also supports the Magic Keyboard with a trackpad launched in early 2020.

=== Fourth generation ===
The fourth generation of iPad Pro was announced on March 18, 2020, with the same screen sizes of the previous generation. It offers a redesigned camera module, an Apple A12Z processor, 128 GB minimum storage, LiDAR Scanner, and support for the Magic Keyboard case.

=== Fifth generation ===
The fifth generation of iPad Pro was announced on April 20, 2021, with the same design and screen sizes as the previous generation. It includes the Apple M1 processor, 5G connectivity, Thunderbolt 3/USB 40 Gbit/s, external display output up to 6K resolution, 8 or 16 GB of RAM, and on the 12.9-inch (330 mm) variant, a mini-LED display marketed as the "Liquid Retina XDR" display.

=== Sixth generation ===
The sixth-generation iPad Pro was announced on October 18, 2022, along with the tenth-generation iPad. They use the same design as the previous generations since 2018. It includes an Apple M2 processor, Apple Pencil Hover (a feature that allows the display to detect the Apple Pencil hovering up to 12 mm above the display), and ProRes Video Recording (limited to 1080p for 128 GB storage and up to 4K for all models with at least 256 GB storage).

=== Seventh generation ===
The seventh-generation iPad Pro was announced on May 7, 2024, along with the M2 iPad Air. This generation features a redesigned chassis that is thinner than the previous generations. It includes the Apple M4 processor, a landscape camera with a Face ID array, and a Tandem OLED display. The display, referred to by Apple as the Ultra Retina XDR display, has a contrast ratio of 2,000,000:1 and can reach a full screen brightness of 1000 nits (SDR content) or 1600 nits (HDR content). Nano-texture display glass is available on models with 1 TB and 2 TB storage. The base storage was increased to 256 GB, with an option to get up to 2 TB of storage.

=== Eighth generation ===
The eighth-generation iPad Pro was announced on October 15, 2025. This generation keeps the same screen sizes and design from the previous generation, but updates the processor to Apple M5 and boosts the default RAM to 12 GB, with the 1 TB and 2 TB models still having 16 GB of the prior generation. Graphics performance is improved by 45%.

== Accessories ==
There are three primary accessories made specifically for iPad Pro, all of which are sold separately: an attachable keyboard, Smart Keyboard; and a form-fitted silicone case that is compatible with the Smart Keyboard. Additionally, with the inclusion of a USB-C connector in the third-generation and newer iPad Pro, it is now possible to connect to other displays and devices, and to charge other devices with the iPad Pro.

=== Smart Keyboard and Smart Cover ===
Smart Keyboard docks are specific with iPad Pro using the visible Smart Connector; a magnetic connection with three pins that provides data transfer and power. The keyboard doubles as a kickstand, and is comparable to that of the competing Microsoft Surface Pro. The design of the Smart Keyboard is similar to the design of the Smart Cover accessory.

=== Apple Pencil ===
==== First generation ====
The first-generation Apple Pencil is a precision stylus exclusive to the first- and second-generation iPad Pro, iPad (6th generation) onwards, iPad Air (3rd generation) and iPad Mini (5th generation). The accessory is rechargeable via the Lightning port on iPad itself on the pre USB-C models. This is possible via a new display with increased responsiveness and precision over previous iPad displays. During the launch announcement, Apple marketed the Pencil with demonstrations of drawing, managing publication layout, and document annotation with the stylus.

==== Second generation ====
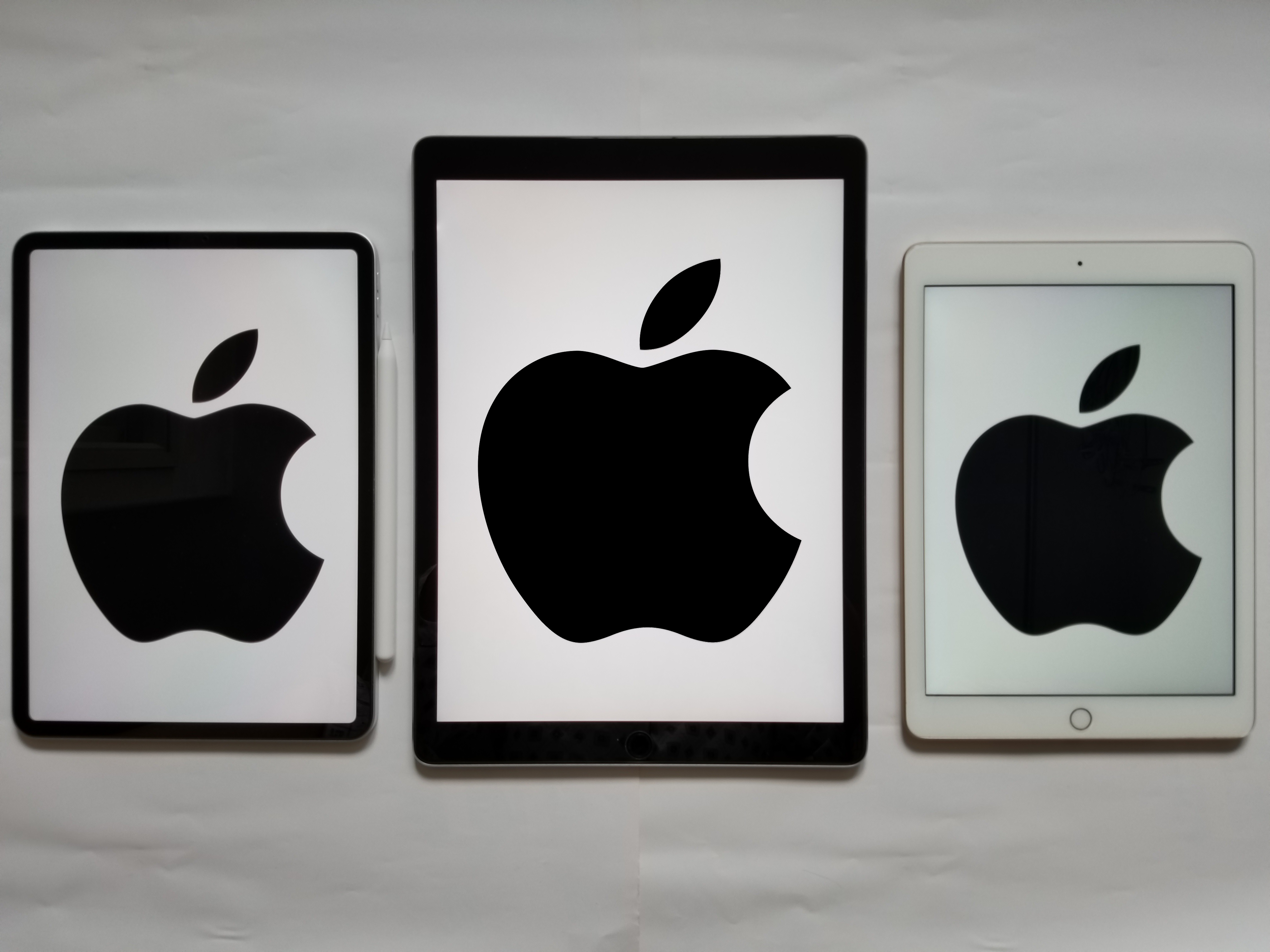
iPad Pro and a second-generation Apple Pencil (left)

On October 30, 2018, Apple announced an updated Pencil alongside the third generation iPad Pro. The second-generation Apple Pencil is compatible with the iPad Pro models from 2018 to 2022, iPad Air (4th generation), and iPad Mini (6th generation). It is similar in design and specifications to the first model, but without the detachable connector, and part of the stylus is flattened to inhibit rolling and to attach to the iPad magnetically and charge. It contains tap-sensitive zones on its sides that can be mapped to functions within apps. Custom laser engraving is also available when purchased via the online Apple Store.

=== USB-C accessories ===
Apple created various adapters to pair with the 2018 iPad Pro models, which are the first iPad models to come with a USB-C connector replacing the proprietary Lightning connector. These adapters utilize the new USB-C connector, which allows the iPad to connect with HDMI cables, USB ports, and read SD cards. Using an HDMI cable, users can connect their iPad to another display, such as a computer, laptop, or television. The USB and SD card support allows user to transfer and save files to and from external memory storage devices.

Third-party developers have taken advantage of the inclusion of USB-C connection in the third-generation iPad Pros to create other adapters, which can include several adapters in one connection. The USB-C port allows the iPad Pro to integrate with various USB-C accessories, ranging from USB-C docking stations, USB-C to USB-A generic adapter with a flash drive, Ethernet, and so on. It can also charge other devices; for instance, a USB-C to Lightning cable to charge a phone or AirPods. An iPad can even be charged with another one with the included USB-C to USB-C cable. There are also USB-C to USB-A adapters, and a USB-C to HDMI adapter to view the iPad display on a television or monitor; wired keyboards and mice also work.

=== Magic Keyboard ===
The Magic Keyboard features the first trackpad designed for an iPad, a hinge to adjust the viewing angle and includes a USB-C port for pass-through charging. The Magic Keyboard is supported by all iPad Pro devices introduced since 2018. Though initially expected to launch in May 2020, orders shipped starting in late April 2020.

The Magic Keyboard was met with mixed reviews. While providing many features which users wanted, there were some downsides to it. The Magic Keyboard provided a proper typing experience and supplied a good trackpad bundled with excellent build quality. On the downside, the added weight to the iPad Pro for this functionality, a missing function key row and a steep price, made the Magic Keyboard an accessory only for a niche market. With the launch of the 5th generation of iPad Pro in 2021, a white color was also added to the Apple Store.

== Reception ==
=== General reviews ===
Despite Apple advertising the tablets as PC replacements, most reviewers noted that it could not replace a laptop running the Microsoft Windows, macOS, or Linux desktop operating systems with its current operating system.

=== First generation ===
Scott Stein from CNET praised the faster processor and new accessories available. However, he criticized the cost of both the unit and its accessories, while noting its slightly slower processor with less RAM compared to the larger 12.9 inches (330 mm) model. Matt Swider from TechRadar complimented the easy handling, large 256 GB configuration and True Tone display, but was upset about the high starting price. Gareth Beavis gave a positive review, commending the expansive screen and audio quality but stated that the battery life could be made longer.

The iPad Pro's 9.7 inches (250 mm) version set a record among all currently released tablets tested in color accuracy, screen reflectance, peak brightness, contrast rating in high ambient light, and smallest color variation. However, the iPad Pro 12.9 inches (330 mm) version had a better contrast ratio in the dark.

=== Second generation ===
Max Parker from TrustedReviews and Gareth Beavis from TechRadar both praised the 10.5-inch (270 mm) model's high-quality audio and performance, though both critics noted that it was expensive.

Reviewing the 12.9-inch (330 mm) second-generation iPad Pro, Lauren Goode of The Verge complimented the quality camera, A10X processor and large screen size, but argued that the device could have been cheaper.

=== Third generation ===
The third generation iPad Pro models were praised for their better displays, slimmed bezels, the addition of Face ID and general speed as well as CPU improvements. Ben Sin from Forbes noted that despite the LCD screen, the 120 Hz refresh rate makes it feel more smooth. The switch to USB-C connectors received mixed reviews; external monitor support and device charging were added at the cost of extra dongles to use older cables and headphones. Some reviewers noted that although the hardware updates are great steps forward, iOS's limitations, including the lack of external storage capabilities, prevents the third generation from competing against computers. iPadOS addresses the lack of external storage on supported iPads by adding support for external storage.

The body has been criticized for bending and breaking easily. Users on forum boards have reported the iPad bending after a few days of use, or after carrying it around in a backpack. YouTuber Zack Nelson then published a video on his channel JerryRigEverything showing the device cracking and snapping in half after applying just a small amount of pressure with his hands in the center of the device. Users reported devices already bent right out of the box, mostly cellular models. Apple responded to these reports quickly, asserting that this is normal and a non-issue, a response that has been criticized. According to Apple, the bending is a byproduct of its new manufacturing process. Apple has added a support page relating to these issues.

=== Fourth generation ===
The 2020 model of the iPad Pro was seen as a minor enhancement amongst technical reviewers. The LIDAR sensor which Apple added for increased AR capability was touted as a feature only a handful of customers will use. The new camera setup in the 2020 model was noted for providing good image quality. The addition in RAM and change in storage options were welcomed, but the 2020 model was sometimes seen as "overkill".

=== Fifth generation ===
The 2021 models had a vast range of reviews feeling that the already powerful processor was made excessively powerful, stating that the processor wasn't being taken advantage of due to iPadOS still being considered too limiting and not having professional apps from macOS. Camera placement has been criticized for video conferencing. The Verge has criticized that they should have had multiuser support like the Mac but they gave positive reviews to the Mini-LED and cameras.

Despite having 8 and 16 gigabytes of RAM, iPadOS only initially allowed 5 gigabytes for apps, but this was changed in iPadOS 15.

== Model comparison ==
=== Support ===
Legend:	Obsolete	Vintage	Unsupported	Discontinued	Current	Upcoming

Model	Release		Discontinued	Latest OS release		Support lifespan
Model	Date	OS	Discontinued	OS	Date	Support lifespan
iPad Pro (1st generation) 12.9-inch	November 11, 2015	iOS 9.1	June 5, 2017	iPadOS 16.7.16	May 11, 2026	10 years, 6 months
iPad Pro (1st generation) 9.7-inch	March 31, 2016	iOS 9.3	June 5, 2017	iPadOS 16.7.16	May 11, 2026	10 years, 1 month
iPad Pro (2nd generation)	June 13, 2017	iOS 10.3	March 18, 2019	iPadOS 17.7.11	May 11, 2026	8 years, 10 months
iPad Pro (3rd generation)	November 7, 2018	iOS 12.1	March 18, 2020	iPadOS 26.7.3	November 9, 2026	8 years
iPad Pro (4th generation)	March 25, 2020	iPadOS 13.4	April 20, 2021	iPadOS 27.2.1	November 9, 2026	6 years, 7 months
iPad Pro (5th generation)	May 21, 2021	iPadOS 14.5	October 18, 2022	iPadOS 27.2.1	November 9, 2026	5 years, 5 months
iPad Pro (6th generation)	October 26, 2022	iPadOS 16.1	May 7, 2024	iPadOS 27.2.1	November 9, 2026	4 years
iPad Pro (M4)	May 15, 2024	iPadOS 17.4	October 15, 2025	iPadOS 27.2.1	November 9, 2026	2 years, 6 months
iPad Pro (M5)	October 22, 2025	iPadOS 26.0	Current	iPadOS 27.2.1	November 9, 2026	1 year

Models	iOS version				iPadOS version							
Models	9	10	11	12	13	14	15	16	17	18	26	27
1st	9.1 / 9.3 (Note: iOS 9.1 on iPad Pro 12.9" (2015). iOS 9.3 on iPad Pro 9.7" (2016).)	Yes	Yes	Yes	Yes	Yes	Yes	Yes	No	No	No	No
2nd	—N/a	10.3	Yes	Yes	Yes	Yes	Yes	Yes	Yes	No	No	No
3rd	—N/a	—N/a	—N/a	12.1	Yes	Yes	Yes	Yes	Yes	Yes	Yes	No
4th	—N/a	—N/a	—N/a	—N/a	13.4	Yes	Yes	Yes	Yes	Yes	Yes	Yes
5th	—N/a	—N/a	—N/a	—N/a	—N/a	14.5	Yes	Yes	Yes	Yes	Yes	Yes
6th	—N/a	—N/a	—N/a	—N/a	—N/a	—N/a	—N/a	16.1	Yes	Yes	Yes	Yes
M4	—N/a	—N/a	—N/a	—N/a	—N/a	—N/a	—N/a	—N/a	17.4	Yes	Yes	Yes
M5	—N/a	—N/a	—N/a	—N/a	—N/a	—N/a	—N/a	—N/a	—N/a	—N/a	Yes	Yes

=== Models ===
Generation		iPad Pro (1st generation)		iPad Pro (2nd generation)		iPad Pro (3rd generation)		iPad Pro (4th generation)		iPad Pro (5th generation)		iPad Pro (6th generation)		iPad Pro (M4)		iPad Pro (M5)	
Model		iPad Pro 12.9-inch (330 mm) (1st generation)	iPad Pro (9.7-inch (250 mm))	iPad Pro (12.9-inch (330 mm)) (2nd generation)	iPad Pro (10.5-inch (270 mm))	iPad Pro 12.9-inch (330 mm) (3rd generation)	iPad Pro 11-inch (280 mm)	iPad Pro 12.9-inch (330 mm) (4th generation)	iPad Pro 11-inch (280 mm) (2nd generation)	iPad Pro, 12.9-inch (330 mm) (5th generation)	iPad Pro, 11-inch (280 mm) (3rd generation)	iPad Pro 12.9-inch (330 mm) (6th generation)	iPad Pro 11-inch (280 mm) (4th generation)	iPad Pro 13-inch (330 mm) (M4)	iPad Pro 11-inch (280 mm) (M4)	iPad Pro 13-inch (330 mm) (M5)	iPad Pro 11-inch (280 mm) (M5)
Image																	
Identifier		iPad6,7, iPad6,8	iPad6,3, iPad6,4	iPad7,1, iPad7,2	iPad7,3, iPad7,4	iPad8,5, iPad8,6, iPad8,7, iPad8,8	iPad8,1, iPad8,2, iPad8,3, iPad8,4	iPad8,11, iPad8,12	iPad8,9, iPad8,10	iPad13,8, iPad13,9, iPad13,10, iPad13,11	iPad13,4, iPad13,5, iPad13,6, iPad13,7	iPad14,5, iPad14,6	iPad14,3, iPad14,4	iPad16,5, iPad16,6	iPad16,3, iPad16,4	iPad17,3, iPad17,4	iPad17,1, iPad17,2
Initial operating system		iOS 9.1	iOS 9.3	iOS 10.3.2		iOS 12.1		iPadOS 13.4		iPadOS 14.5		iPadOS 16		iPadOS 17.5		iPadOS 26	
Model number		A1584 (Wi-Fi) A1652 (Wi-Fi + Cellular)	A1673 (Wi-Fi) A1674 or A1675 (Wi-Fi + Cellular)	A1670 (Wi-Fi) A1671 (Wi-Fi + Cellular) A1821 (Wi-Fi + Cellular, China model)	A1701 (Wi-Fi) A1709 (Wi-Fi + Cellular) A1852 (Wi-Fi + Cellular, China model)	A1876 (Wi-Fi) A1895, A2014 (Wi-Fi + Cellular) A1983 (Wi-Fi + Cellular, China model)	A1980 (Wi-Fi) A1934, A2013 (Wi-Fi + Cellular) A1979 (Wi-Fi + Cellular, China model)	A2229 (Wi-Fi) A2069, A2232 (Wi-Fi + Cellular) A2233 (Wi-Fi + Cellular, China model)	A2228 (Wi-Fi) A2068, A2230 (Wi-Fi + Cellular) A2231 (Wi-Fi + Cellular, China model)	A2378 (Wi-Fi) A2461 (Wi-Fi + Cellular) A2379 (Wi-Fi + Cellular with mmWave) A2462 (Wi-Fi + Cellular, China model)	A2377 (Wi-Fi) A2459 (Wi-Fi + Cellular) A2301 (Wi-Fi + Cellular with mmWave) A2460 (Wi-Fi + Cellular, China model)	A2436 (Wi-Fi) A2764 (Wi-Fi + US Cellular) A2437 (Wi-Fi + Global Cellular) A2766 (Wi-Fi + China Cellular)	A2759 (Wi-Fi) A2435 (Wi-Fi + US Cellular) A2761 (Wi-Fi + Global Cellular) A2762 (Wi-Fi + China Cellular)	A2925 (Wi-Fi) A2926 (Wi-Fi + Cellular) A3007 (Wi-Fi + Cellular, China model)	A2836 (Wi-Fi) A2837 (Wi-Fi + Cellular) A2006 (Wi-Fi + Cellular, China model)	A3360 (Wi-Fi) A3361 (Wi-Fi + Cellular) A3362 (Wi-Fi + Cellular, China model)	A3357 (Wi-Fi) A3358 (Wi-Fi + Cellular) A3359 (Wi-Fi + Cellular, China model)
Announcement date		September 9, 2015	March 21, 2016	June 5, 2017		October 30, 2018		March 18, 2020		April 20, 2021		October 18, 2022		May 7, 2024		October 15, 2025	
Release date		November 11, 2015	March 31, 2016	June 13, 2017		November 7, 2018		March 25, 2020		May 21, 2021		October 26, 2022		May 15, 2024		October 22, 2025	
Launch price		Wi-Fi models 32 GB: $799; 128 GB: $949; 256 GB: $1,099 Wi-Fi + Cellular models 128 GB: $1,079; 256 GB: $1,229	Wi-Fi models 32 GB: $599; 128 GB: $749; 256 GB: $899 Wi-Fi + Cellular models 32 GB: $729; 128 GB: $879; 256 GB: $1,029	Wi-Fi models 64 GB: $799; 256 GB: $899; 512 GB: $1,099 Wi-Fi + Cellular models 64 GB: $929; 256 GB: $1,029; 512 GB: $1,229	Wi-Fi models 64 GB: $649; 256 GB: $749; 512 GB: $949 Wi-Fi + Cellular models 64 GB: $779; 256 GB: $879; 512 GB: $1,079	Wi-Fi models 64 GB: $999; 256 GB: $1,149; 512 GB: $1,349; 1 TB: $1,749 Wi-Fi + Cellular models 64 GB: $1,149; 256 GB: $1,299; 512 GB: $1,499; 1 TB: $1,899	Wi-Fi models 64 GB: $799; 256 GB: $949; 512 GB: $1,149; 1 TB $1,549 Wi-Fi + Cellular models 64 GB: $949; 256 GB: $1,099; 512 GB: $1,299; 1 TB: $1,699	Wi-Fi models 128 GB: $999; 256 GB: $1,099; 512 GB: $1,299; 1 TB: $1,449 Wi-Fi + Cellular models 128 GB: $1,149; 256 GB: $1,249; 512 GB: $1,449; 1 TB: $1,649	Wi-Fi models 128 GB: $799; 256 GB: $899; 512 GB: $1,099; 1 TB: $1,299 Wi-Fi + Cellular models 128 GB: $949; 256 GB: $1,049; 512 GB: $1,249; 1 TB: $1,449	Wi-Fi models 128 GB: $1,099; 256 GB: $1,199; 512 GB: $1,399; 1 TB: $1,799; 2 TB: $2,199 Wi-Fi + Cellular models 128 GB: $1,299; 256 GB: $1,399; 512 GB: $1,599; 1 TB: $1,999; 2 TB: $2,399	Wi-Fi models 128 GB: $799; 256 GB: $899; 512 GB: $1,099; 1 TB: $1,499; 2 TB $1,899 Wi-Fi + Cellular models 128 GB: $999; 256 GB: $1,099; 512 GB: $1,299; 1 TB: $1,699; 2 TB: $2,099	Wi-Fi models 128 GB: $1,099; 256 GB: $1,199; 512 GB: $1,399; 1 TB: $1,799; 2 TB $2,199 Wi-Fi + Cellular models 128 GB: $1,299; 256 GB: $1,399; 512 GB: $1,599; 1 TB: $1,999; 2 TB: $2,399	Wi-Fi models 128 GB: $799; 256 GB: $899; 512 GB: $1,099; 1 TB: $1,499; 2 TB: $1,899 Wi-Fi + Cellular models 128 GB: $999; 256 GB: $1,099; 512 GB: $1,299; 1 TB: $1,699; 2 TB: $2,099	Wi-Fi models 256 GB: $1,299; 512 GB: $1,499; 1 TB: $1,899; 2 TB: $2,299 Wi-Fi + Cellular models 256 GB: $1,499; 512 GB: $1,699; 1 TB: $2,099; 2 TB: $2,499	Wi-Fi models 256 GB: $999; 512 GB: $1,199; 1 TB: $1,599; 2 TB: $1,999 Wi-Fi + Cellular models 256 GB: $1,199; 512 GB: $1,399; 1 TB: $1,799; 2 TB: $2,199	Wi-Fi models 256 GB: $1,299; 512 GB: $1,499; 1 TB: $1,899; 2 TB: $2,299 Wi-Fi + Cellular models 256 GB: $1,499; 512 GB: $1,699; 1 TB: $2,099; 2 TB: $2,499	Wi-Fi models 256 GB: $999; 512 GB: $1,199; 1 TB: $1,599; 2 TB: $1,999 Wi-Fi + Cellular models 256 GB: $1,299; 512 GB: $1,399; 1 TB: $1,799; 2 TB: $2,199
SoC	Name	Apple A9X		Apple A10X Fusion		Apple A12X Bionic		Apple A12Z Bionic		Apple M1		Apple M2		Apple M4		Apple M5	
SoC	Motion coprocessor	Apple M9		Apple M10		Apple A12X Bionic		Apple A12Z Bionic		Apple M1		Apple M2		Apple M4		Apple M5	
SoC	CPU	2.26 GHz 2-core Apple Twister	2.26 GHz 2-core Apple Twister (underclocked to 2.16 GHz)	~2.36 GHz 6-core Apple Fusion (3× Hurricane + 3× Zephyr)		7 nm, 8-core SoC; 4x Vortex performance cores + 4x Tempest efficiency cores				5 nm, 8-core SoC; 4x Firestorm performance cores + 4x Icestorm efficiency cores		5 nm, 8-core SoC; 4x Avalanche performance cores + 4x Blizzard efficiency cores		3 nm, 9- or 10-core SoC; 3x or 4x performance cores + 6x efficiency cores		3 nm, 9- or 10-core SoC; 3x or 4x performance cores + 6x efficiency cores	
SoC	GPU	12-core PowerVR Series 7XT				7-core GPU		8-core GPU				10-core GPU					
SoC	Memory	4 GB LPDDR4 RAM	2 GB LPDDR4 RAM	4 GB LPDDR4 RAM		64/256/512 GB – 4 GB LPDDR4X RAM; 1 TB – 6 GB LPDDR4X RAM		6 GB LPDDR4X RAM		128/256/512 GB – 8 GB; 1/2 TB – 16 GB		128/256/512 GB – 8 GB; 1/2 TB – 16 GB		256/512 GB GB – 8 GB; 1/2 TB – 16 GB		256/512 GB GB – 12 GB; 1/2 TB – 16 GB	
Display		12.9 inches (330 mm) diagonal display with LED backlighting Oleophobic coating Fully laminated Anti-reflective coating	9.7 inches (250 mm) diagonal display with LED backlighting Oleophobic coating Wide color True Tone; Fully laminated Antireflective coating	10.5 or 12.9 inches (330 mm) diagonal display with LED backlighting Oleophobic coating Wide color True Tone; Fully laminated Anti-reflective coating ProMotion (120 Hertz refresh rate)		12.9 inches (330 mm) or 11 inches (280 mm) diagonal Liquid Retina Display; Oleophobic coating P3 Wide color True Tone; Fully laminated Anti-reflective coating ProMotion (120 Hertz refresh rate)				12.9 inches (330 mm) diagonal Liquid Retina XDR Display; Oleophobic coating P3 Wide color True Tone; Fully laminated Anti-reflective coating ProMotion (120 Hertz refresh rate)	Same as previous generation	Same as previous generation		13 inches (330 mm) or 11 inches (280 mm) diagonal Ultra Retina XDR Display; Oleophobic coating P3 Wide color True Tone; Fully laminated Anti-reflective coating ProMotion (120 Hertz refresh rate)		Same as previous generation	
Display		2732-by-2048 pixel resolution at 264 ppi (Retina Display)	2048-by-1536 pixel resolution at 264 ppi (Retina Display)	Same as previous generation	2224-by-1668 pixel resolution at 264 ppi (Retina Display)	2732-by-2048 pixel resolution at 264 ppi (Liquid Retina); Maximum 600 nits (12.9") 2388-by-1668 pixel resolution at 264 ppi (Liquid Retina); Maximum 600 nits (11")				In addition to previous generation: 2D backlighting system with 2596 full‑array local dimming zones Maximum overall 1000 nits, peak 1600 nits when displaying HDR content, 1,000,000:1 contrast ratio	Same as previous generation	Same as previous generation		2752-by-2064 pixel resolution at 264 ppi In addition to previous generation: Tandem OLED with 2,000,000:1 contrast ratio	2420-by-1668 pixel resolution at 264 ppi In addition to previous generation: Tandem OLED with 2,000,000:1 contrast ratio, maximum 1000 nits, peak 1600 nits (HDR content only)	Same as previous generation	
Camera		8 MP, ƒ/2.4 aperture, HDR for photos, Autofocus, 5-element lens, Face Detection, Exposure control, Panorama (up to 43 MP), Photo geotagging, auto image stabilization, burst mode, Timer mode	12 MP, ƒ/2.2 aperture, Auto HDR for photos, 5-element lens, Autofocus with Focus Pixels, face detection, Exposure control, Panorama (up to 63 MP), Photo geotagging, auto image stabilization, burst mode, Timer mode, Live Photos, True Tone flash, Sapphire crystal lens cover, local tone mapping, noise reduction	12 MP, ƒ/1.8 aperture, up to 5x digital zoom, optical image stabilization, Auto HDR for photos, Autofocus with Focus Pixels, 6-element lens, face detection, Exposure control, Panorama (up to 63 MP), Photo geotagging, auto image stabilization, burst mode, Timer mode, Quad-LED True Tone flash, Sapphire crystal lens cover, local tone mapping, noise reduction		12-megapixel camera, ƒ/1.8 aperture, up to 5x digital zoom, 5‑element lens, Quad-LED True Tone flash, panorama (up to 63 MP), sapphire crystal lens cover, autofocus with Focus Pixels, Live Photos, wide color capture for photos and Live Photos, local tone mapping, face detection, exposure control, noise reduction, Smart HDR for photos, photo geotagging, auto image stabilization, burst mode, timer mode		Wide: 12-megapixel camera, ƒ/1.8 aperture Ultra Wide: 10-megapixel camera, ƒ/2.4 aperture, 125˚ field of view All: up to 5x digital zoom, 5‑element lens, Quad-LED True Tone flash, panorama (up to 63 MP), Sapphire crystal lens cover, autofocus with Focus Pixels, Live Photos, wide color capture for photos and Live Photos, local tone mapping, face detection, exposure control, noise reduction, Smart HDR for photos, photo geotagging, auto image stabilization, burst mode, timer mode		Wide: 12-megapixel camera, ƒ/1.8 aperture Ultra Wide: 10-megapixel camera, ƒ/2.4 aperture, 125˚ field of view All: up to 5x digital zoom, 5‑element lens, Brighter True Tone flash, panorama (up to 63 MP), sapphire crystal lens cover, autofocus with Focus Pixels, Live Photos, wide color capture for photos and Live Photos, face detection, local tone mapping, exposure control, noise reduction, Smart HDR 3 for photos, photo geotagging, auto image stabilization, burst mode, timer mode		Wide: 12-megapixel camera, ƒ/1.8 aperture Ultra Wide: 10-megapixel camera, ƒ/2.4 aperture, 125˚ field of view All: up to 5x digital zoom, 5‑element lens, Brighter True Tone flash, panorama (up to 63 MP), sapphire crystal lens cover, autofocus with Focus Pixels, Live Photos, wide color capture for photos and Live Photos, face detection, local tone mapping, exposure control, noise reduction, Smart HDR 4 for photos, photo geotagging, auto image stabilization, burst mode, timer mode		12-megapixel camera, ƒ/1.8 aperture, up to 5x digital zoom, 5‑element lens, Adaptive True Tone flash, panorama (up to 63 MP), sapphire crystal lens cover, autofocus with Focus Pixels, wide color capture for photos and Live Photos, face detection, local tone mapping, exposure control, noise reduction, Smart HDR 4 for photos, photo geotagging, auto image stabilization, burst mode, timer mode			
Video recording		1080p video recording (30 fps), Slo-mo video support for 720p at 120 fps, Time-lapse video, Video image stabilization, 3× digital zoom, video geotagging	4K video recording (30 fps), 1080p HD video recording at 30 fps or 60 fps, Slo-mo video support for 1080p at 120 fps and 720p at 240 fps, Time-lapse video, Cinematic video stabilization, 3× video zoom, video geotagging	4K video recording (30 fps), 1080p HD video recording at 30fps or 60fps, optical image stabilization for video, Slo-mo video support for 1080p at 120 fps and 720p at 240 fps, Time-lapse video, Cinematic video stabilization, 3× video zoom, video geotagging		4K video recording at 30 fps or 60 fps, 1080p HD video recording at 30 fps or 60 fps, 720p HD video recording at 30 fps, slo‑mo video support for 1080p at 120 fps and 720p at 240 fps, time‑lapse video with stabilization, cinematic video stabilization (1080p and 720p), 3× video zoom, continuous autofocus video, playback zoom, audio zoom, stereo recording, video geotagging		4K video recording at 24 fps, 30 fps or 60 fps, 1080p HD video recording at 30 fps or 60 fps, 720p HD video recording at 30 fps, slo‑mo video support for 1080p at 120 fps or 240 fps, time‑lapse video with stabilization, cinematic video stabilization (1080p and 720p), digital zoom up to 3x, continuous autofocus video, playback zoom, audio zoom, stereo recording, video geotagging		4K video recording at 24 fps, 30 fps or 60 fps, 1080p HD video recording at 30 fps or 60 fps, 720p HD video recording at 30 fps, slo‑mo video support for 1080p at 120 fps or 240 fps, time‑lapse video with stabilization, cinematic video stabilization (4K, 1080p and 720p), digital zoom up to 3x, continuous autofocus video, playback zoom, audio zoom, stereo recording, video geotagging		4K video recording at 24 fps, 30 fps or 60 fps, 1080p HD video recording at 30 fps or 60 fps, 720p HD video recording at 30 fps, slo‑mo video support for 1080p at 120 fps or 240 fps, time‑lapse video with stabilization, cinematic video stabilization (4K, 1080p and 720p), digital zoom up to 3x, continuous autofocus video, playback zoom, audio zoom, stereo recording, video geotagging, ProRes video recording up to 4K at 30 fps (1080p at 30 fps for 128GB capacity)		4K video recording at 24 fps, 30 fps or 60 fps, 1080p HD video recording at 30 fps or 60 fps, 720p HD video recording at 30 fps, slo‑mo video support for 1080p at 120 fps or 240 fps, time‑lapse video with stabilization, cinematic video stabilization (4K, 1080p and 720p), digital zoom up to 3x, continuous autofocus video, playback zoom, audio zoom, stereo recording, video geotagging, ProRes video recording up to 4K at 30 fps (1080p at 30 fps for 256GB capacity)			
FaceTime HD / TrueDepth		1.2 MP, ƒ/2.2 aperture, 720p HD video recording, HDR for photos and videos, Exposure control, Burst mode, Timer mode and Face detection	5 MP, ƒ/2.2 aperture, 720p HD video recording, Retina Flash, Auto HDR for photos and videos, Exposure control, Burst mode, Timer mode and Face detection	7 MP ƒ/2.2 aperture, 1080p HD video recording, Retina Flash, wide color capture for photos and Live Photos, Auto HDR for photos and videos, auto image stabilization, Exposure control, Burst mode, Timer mode and Face detection		7 MP, Portrait mode, Portrait Lighting, Animoji and Memoji, 1080p HD video recording at 30 or 60 fps, Retina Flash, ƒ/2.2 aperture, Wide color capture for photos and Live Photos, Smart HDR, auto image stabilization, Exposure control, Burst mode, Timer mode, face detection				12 MP Ultra Wide, Portrait mode, Portrait Lighting, Animoji and Memoji, 1080p HD video recording at 30 or 60 fps, Retina Flash, ƒ/2.4 aperture, Wide color capture for photos and Live Photos, Smart HDR 3, time‑lapse video with stabilization, cinematic video stabilization (1080p and 720p), auto image stabilization, exposure control, Burst mode, timer mode, face detection		12 MP Ultra Wide, Portrait mode, Portrait Lighting, Animoji and Memoji, 1080p HD video recording at 30 or 60 fps, Retina Flash, ƒ/2.4 aperture, Wide color capture for photos and Live Photos, Smart HDR 4, time‑lapse video with stabilization, cinematic video stabilization (1080p and 720p), auto image stabilization, exposure control, Burst mode, timer mode, face detection		Landscape 12 MP Center Stage, Portrait mode, Portrait Lighting, Animoji and Memoji, 1080p HD video recording at 30 or 60 fps, Retina Flash, ƒ/2.0 aperture, Wide color capture for photos and Live Photos, Smart HDR 4, time‑lapse video with stabilization, cinematic video stabilization (1080p and 720p), auto image stabilization, exposure control, Burst mode, timer mode, face detection			
Wireless	Wi-Fi	Wi-Fi 5; dual channel (2.4 GHz and 5 GHz); HT80 with MIMO						Wi-Fi 6; dual channel (2.4 GHz and 5 GHz); HT80 with MIMO				Wi-Fi 6E with 2x2 MIMO; 2.4 GHz, 5 GHz and 6 GHz				Wi-Fi 7 with 2x2 MIMO; 2.4 GHz, 5 GHz and 6 GHz	
Wireless	Cellular	UMTS/HSPA/HSPA+/DC-HSDPA (850, 900, 1700/2100, 1900, 2100 MHz); GSM/EDGE (850, 900, 1800, 1900 MHz), CDMA EV-DO Rev. A and Rev. B (800, 1900 MHz); LTE (Bands 1, 2, 3, 4, 5, 7, 8, 13, 17, 18, 19, 20, 25, 26, 28, 29, 38, 39, 40, 41); Data only; Includes Apple SIM (U.S., UK, and Germany only)	UMTS/HSPA/HSPA+/DC‑HSDPA (850, 900, 1700/2100, 1900, 2100 MHz); GSM/EDGE (850, 900, 1800, 1900 MHz), CDMA EV-DO Rev. A and Rev. B (800, 1900 MHz); LTE Advanced (Bands 1, 2, 3, 4, 5, 7, 8, 12, 13, 17, 18, 19, 20, 25, 26, 27, 28, 29, 30, 38, 39, 40, 41); Data only; Embedded Apple SIM			UMTS/HSPA/HSPA+/DC‑HSDPA (850, 900, 1700/2100, 1900, 2100 MHz); GSM/EDGE (850, 900, 1800, 1900 MHz); Gigabit-class LTE (Models A2013 and A2014: bands 1, 2, 3, 4, 5, 7, 8, 11, 12, 13, 14, 17, 18, 19, 20, 21, 25, 26, 29, 30, 34, 38, 39, 40, 41, 46, 66, 71); Data only; Wi-Fi calling; eSIM		UMTS/HSPA/HSPA+/DC‑HSDPA (850, 900, 1700/2100, 1900, 2100 MHz); GSM/EDGE (850, 900, 1800, 1900 MHz); Gigabit-class LTE (Models A2068 and A2069: bands 1, 2, 3, 4, 5, 7, 8, 11, 12, 13, 14, 17, 18, 19, 20, 21, 25, 26, 29, 30, 34, 38, 39, 40, 41, 46, 66, 71); Data only; Wi-Fi calling; eSIM		5G NR (Bands n1, n2, n3, n5, n7, n8, n12, n20, n25, n28, n38, n40, n41, n66, n71, n77, n78, n79); 5G NR mmWave (Bands n260, n261); FDD-LTE (Bands 1, 2, 3, 4, 5, 7, 8, 11, 12, 13, 14, 17, 18, 19, 20, 21, 25, 26, 28, 29, 30, 32, 66, 71); TD-LTE (Bands 34, 38, 39, 40, 41, 42, 46, 48); UMTS/HSPA/HSPA+/DC‑HSDPA (850, 900, 1700/2100, 1900, 2100 MHz); GSM/EDGE (850, 900, 1800, 1900 MHz); Data only; Wi-Fi calling; eSIM		5G NR (Bands n1, n2, n3, n5, n7, n8, n12, n14, n20, n25, n26, n28, n29, n30, n38, n40, n41, n66, n70, n71, n77, n78, n79); 5G NR mmWave (Bands n258, n260, n261); FDD-LTE (Bands 1, 2, 3, 4, 5, 7, 8, 11, 12, 13, 14, 17, 18, 19, 20, 21, 25, 26, 28, 29, 30, 32, 66, 71); TD-LTE (Bands 34, 38, 39, 40, 41, 42, 46, 48); UMTS/HSPA/HSPA+/DC‑HSDPA (850, 900, 1700/2100, 1900, 2100 MHz); GSM/EDGE (850, 900, 1800, 1900 MHz); Data only; Wi-Fi calling; eSIM		5G NR (Bands n1, n2, n3, n5, n7, n8, n12, n14, n20, n25, n26, n28, n29, n30, n38, n40, n41, n66, n70, n71, n75, n76, n77, n78, n79); FDD-LTE (Bands 1, 2, 3, 4, 5, 7, 8, 11, 12, 13, 14, 17, 18, 19, 20, 21, 25, 26, 28, 29, 30, 32, 66, 71); TD-LTE (Bands 34, 38, 39, 40, 41, 42, 48); UMTS/HSPA/HSPA+/DC‑HSDPA (850, 900, 1700/2100, 1900, 2100 MHz; Data only; Wi-Fi calling; eSIM		5G NR (Bands n1, n2, n3, n5, n7, n8, n12, n14, n20, n25, n26, n28, n29, n30, n38, n40, n41, n66, n70, n71, n75, n77, n78, n79); FDD-LTE (Bands 1, 2, 3, 4, 5, 7, 8, 11, 12, 13, 14, 17, 18, 19, 20, 21, 25, 26, 28, 29, 30, 32, 66, 71); TD-LTE (Bands 34, 38, 39, 40, 41, 42, 48); UMTS/HSPA/HSPA+/DC‑HSDPA (850, 900, 1700/2100, 1900, 2100 MHz; Data only; Wi-Fi calling; eSIM	
Wireless	Bluetooth	Bluetooth 4.2				Bluetooth 5.0						Bluetooth 5.3				Bluetooth 6.0	
Geolocation	Wi-Fi models	Wi-Fi; Apple location databases; iBeacon microlocation						Digital compass; Wi-Fi; iBeacon microlocation									
Geolocation	Wi-Fi + Cellular models	Above plus: Assisted GPS; GLONASS; Cellular network						Above plus: Assisted GPS, GLONASS, Galileo, and QZSS; Cellular									
Geolocation	Environmental sensors	Accelerometer; Gyroscope; Ambient light sensor; Magnetometer; Barometer						Accelerometer; Gyroscope; Ambient light sensor; Magnetometer; Barometer; LiDAR									
Geolocation	Battery	3.77 V 38.8 W·h (10307 mA·h) rechargeable lithium‐polymer battery	3.82 V 27.91 W·h (7306 mA·h) rechargeable lithium‐polymer battery	3.77 V 41 W·h (10875 mA·h) rechargeable lithium‐polymer battery	3.77 V 30.8 W·h (8134 mA·h) rechargeable lithium‐polymer battery	3.76 V 36.55 W⋅h (9720 mA·h) rechargeable li-ion battery	3.77 V 29.45 W⋅h (7812 mA⋅h) rechargeable li-ion battery	3.76 V 36.55 W⋅h (9720 mA·h) rechargeable li-ion battery	3.77 V 29.45 W⋅h (7812 mA⋅h) rechargeable li-ion battery	3.76 V 40.88 W⋅h (10872 mA·h) rechargeable li-ion battery	3.77 V 28.65 W⋅h (7599 mA⋅h) rechargeable li-ion battery	3.76 V 40.88 W⋅h (10872 mA·h) rechargeable li-ion battery	3.77 V 28.65 W⋅h (7599 mA⋅h) rechargeable li-ion battery	3.82 V 38.99 W·h (10209 mA·h) rechargeable li-ion battery	3.83 V 31.29 W·h (8160 mA·h) rechargeable li-ion battery	3.82 V 38.99 W·h (10209 mA·h) rechargeable li-ion battery	3.83 V 31.29 W·h (8160 mA·h) rechargeable li-ion battery
Dimensions	Height	305.7 mm (12.04 in)	240 mm (9.4 in)	305.7 mm (12.04 in)	250.6 mm (9.87 in)	280.6 mm (11.05 in)	247.6 mm (9.75 in)	280.6 mm (11.05 in)	247.6 mm (9.75 in)	280.6 mm (11.05 in)	247.6 mm (9.75 in)	280.6 mm (11.05 in)	247.6 mm (9.75 in)	281.6 mm (11.09 in)	249.7 mm (9.83 in)	281.6 mm (11.09 in)	249.7 mm (9.83 in)
Dimensions	Width	220.6 mm (8.69 in)	169.5 mm (6.67 in)	220.6 mm (8.69 in)	174.1 mm (6.85 in)	214.9 mm (8.46 in)	178.5 mm (7.03 in)	214.9 mm (8.46 in)	178.5 mm (7.03 in)	214.9 mm (8.46 in)	178.5 mm (7.03 in)	214.9 mm (8.46 in)	178.5 mm (7.03 in)	215.5 mm (8.48 in)	177.5 mm (6.99 in)	215.5 mm (8.48 in)	177.5 mm (6.99 in)
Dimensions	Depth	6.9 mm (0.27 in)	6.1 mm (0.24 in)	6.9 mm (0.27 in)	6.1 mm (0.24 in)	5.9 mm (0.23 in)	5.9 mm (0.23 in)	5.9 mm (0.23 in)	5.9 mm (0.23 in)	6.4 mm (0.25 in)	5.9 mm (0.23 in)	6.4 mm (0.25 in)	5.9 mm (0.23 in)	5.1 mm (0.20 in)	5.3 mm (0.21 in)	5.1 mm (0.20 in)	5.3 mm (0.21 in)
Weight	Wi-Fi models	710 g (1.57 lb)	677 g (1.493 lb)	437 g (0.963 lb)	469 g (1.034 lb)	468 g (1.032 lb)	631 g (1.391 lb)	641 g (1.413 lb)	471 g (1.038 lb)	682 g (1.504 lb)	466 g (1.027 lb)	682 g (1.504 lb)	466 g (1.027 lb)	579 g (1.276 lb)	444 g (0.979 lb)	579 g (1.276 lb)	444 g (0.979 lb)
Weight	Wi-Fi + Cellular models	720 g (1.59 lb)	444 g (0.979 lb)	692 g (1.526 lb)	477 g (1.052 lb)	468 g (1.032 lb)	633 g (1.396 lb)	643 g (1.418 lb)	473 g (1.043 lb)	685 g (1.510 lb)	470 g (1.04 lb)	685 g (1.510 lb)	470 g (1.04 lb)	582 g (1.283 lb)	446 g (0.983 lb)	582 g (1.283 lb)	446 g (0.983 lb)
Mechanical keys		Home button; Sleep/Wake; Volume control				Sleep/Wake; Volume control											
Connectors		Lightning Connector; Apple Smart Connector; 3.5 mm audio jack connector				USB-C (USB 10Gbps); Apple Smart Connector; Apple Magnetic Connector (Apple Pencil)				USB-C (Thunderbolt 3 & USB 40Gbps); Apple Smart Connector; Apple Magnetic Connector (Apple Pencil)							
Speakers		Quad stereo															

== Timeline ==
Timeline of iPad models
See also: List of Apple products

Source: Apple Newsroom Archive.

== See also ==
- Pen computing
- Graphics tablet
