= Apple M5 =

System-on-a-chip series designed by Apple Inc.

General information
- Launched: October 15, 2025; 13 months ago
- Designed by: Apple
- Common manufacturer: TSMC

Physical specifications
- Cores: M5: 9 (3 S + 6 E) or 10 (4 S + 6 E); Pro: 15 (5 S + 10 P) or 18 (6 S + 12 P); Max: 18 (6 S + 12 P); Ultra: 30 (10 S + 20 P) or 36 (12 S + 24 P)
- Memory (RAM): M5: 12, 16, 24 or 32 GB; Pro: 24, 48 or 64 GB; Max: 36, 48, 64 or 128 GB; Ultra: 96, 256 or 512 GB; (LPDDR5X, 9600 MT/s)
- GPUs: M5: 8 or 10 cores; Pro: 16 or 20 cores; Max: 32 or 40 cores; Ultra: 64 or 80 cores
- Co-processor: NPU: 42 TOPS (16 cores)

Architecture and classification
- Application: Apple Vision Pro, MacBook Air, MacBook Pro, iPad Pro, Mac Studio
- Technology node: 3 nm (N3P)
- Instruction set: ARMv9.2-A

History
- Predecessor: Apple M4
- Successor: Apple M6

The Apple M5 is a series of ARM-based systems on a chip (SoCs) designed by Apple Inc. as part of the Apple silicon family. Each chip integrates a central processing unit (CPU), graphics processing unit (GPU), neural processing unit (NPU), and unified memory in a single package. The base M5 was announced on October 15, 2025, for the 14-inch MacBook Pro, iPad Pro, and Apple Vision Pro, succeeding the Apple M4. Apple introduced the M5 Pro and M5 Max on March 3, 2026, alongside updated MacBook Pro models. A workstation chip, the M5 Ultra, was introduced in August 2026 alongside an updated Mac Studio.

All three variants are manufactured using TSMC's third-generation 3-nanometer process. The base M5 uses a single-die design, while the M5 Pro and M5 Max use Apple's Fusion Architecture, which combines two dies into a single SoC.

== Design ==
Apple M series comparison
| Chip | CPU cores | | | GPU cores | RAM options (GB) | Displays | Memory bandwidth (GB/s) | Introduced |
| Chip | S | P | E | GPU cores | RAM options (GB) | Displays | Memory bandwidth (GB/s) | Introduced |
|---|---|---|---|---|---|---|---|---|
| M1 | —N/a | 4 | 4 | 8 | 8/16 | 2 | 68 | 2020 |
| M2 | —N/a | 4 | 4 | 10 | 8/16/24 | 2 | 102 | 2022 |
| M3 | —N/a | 4 | 4 | 10 | 8/16/24 | 2 | 102 | 2023 |
| M4 | —N/a | 4 | 6 | 10 | 16/24/32 | 3 | 120 | 2024 |
| M5 | 4 | —N/a | 6 | 10 | 16/24/32 | 3 | 153 | 2025 |
| M6 | 2 | 4 | 6 | 12 | 16 | 3 | 153 | 2026 |
| M6 | 2 | 4 | 6 | 12 | 24/32 | 3 | 170 | 2026 |

=== CPU ===
All variants of M5 are multi-core processors with heterogeneous computing capabilities, where two groups of CPU cores based on different microarchitectures work in simultaneity, achieved via a big.LITTLE implementation. These two types of cores are optimized for high performance and power efficiency, respectively, and are referred to by Apple as the "super core" and "efficiency core", with the former originally introduced as the "performance core" when the base M5 launched in October 2025 and retroactively renamed with the announcement of the M5 Pro and M5 Max. Apple describes it as the world's fastest CPU core for single-threaded performance, citing increased front-end bandwidth, a new cache hierarchy, and enhanced branch prediction.

The base M5 has up to a 10-core CPU consisting of up to four super cores and six efficiency cores, delivering up to 15 percent faster multithreaded performance compared to M4. Lower-storage iPad Pro configurations use a binned 9-core variant with one performance core disabled.

The M5 Pro and M5 Max replace the efficiency cores with an all-new "performance core", a distinct design optimized for power-efficient multithreaded workloads, not to be confused with the super core despite the naming overlap with previous generations. The M5 Pro is available with either 15 cores (5 super + 10 performance) or 18 cores (6 super + 12 performance), while the M5 Max features the full 18-core configuration. Apple claims up to 30 percent faster multithreaded performance over M4 Pro and M4 Max, and up to 2.5 times higher multithreaded performance than M1 Pro and M1 Max.

=== GPU ===
The M5 generation introduces a next-generation GPU architecture with a dedicated Neural Accelerator integrated into each GPU core. This architecture is shared across all three variants and scales in core count: 8 or 10 cores on the base M5, 16 or 20 on the M5 Pro, and 32 or 40 on the M5 Max. Apple claims over four times the peak GPU compute for AI workloads compared to the corresponding M4-generation chip, and over six times compared to M1.

The GPU also includes enhanced shader cores, hardware-accelerated mesh shading, second-generation dynamic caching, and Apple's third-generation ray-tracing engine. Apple claims overall graphics performance is up to 30 percent faster than M4 on the base chip, and up to 20 percent faster on the Pro and Max compared to their M4 counterparts, with ray-tracing workloads seeing gains of up to 45 percent (base M5) and up to 35 percent (M5 Pro) or 30 percent (M5 Max) over the prior generation.

Developers can program the Neural Accelerators directly using Tensor APIs in Metal 4. Applications using Apple frameworks such as Core ML, Metal Performance Shaders, and Metal 4 benefit from automatic performance gains.

=== Neural Engine ===
All M5 variants include a 16-core Neural Engine. On the M5 Pro and M5 Max, the Neural Engine has a higher-bandwidth connection to memory, which Apple says accelerates on-device Apple Intelligence features and other AI workloads.

=== Memory ===
All M5 chips use a unified memory architecture, where CPU, GPU, and Neural Engine share the same single pool of LPDDR5X memory.

The base M5 offers up to 32 GB of unified memory with a theoretical maximum bandwidth of 153.6 GB/s (LPDDR5X at 9600 MT/s), a nearly 30 percent increase over M4. The M5 Pro supports up to 64 GB with a theoretical maximum bandwidth of up to 307 GB/s, and the M5 Max supports up to 128 GB, with a theoretical maximum bandwidth of up to 460 GB/s for the 32-core GPU configuration and 614 GB/s for the 40-core GPU configuration.

=== Media Engine ===
All M5 variants include a Media Engine with support for hardware-accelerated H.264, HEVC, ProRes, ProRes RAW, and AV1 decode. The M5 Max doubles the media pipeline, featuring two video encode engines and two ProRes encode and decode engines, compared to one of each on the M5 and M5 Pro.

=== Additional features ===
For Apple Vision Pro, the base M5 includes an enhanced display controller that renders 10 percent more pixels with the micro-OLED displays and supports refresh rates up to 120 Hz.

All M5 variants support Memory Integrity Enforcement (MIE), a hardware- and software-based memory safety system that uses ARM's Enhanced Memory Tagging Extension (EMTE) in synchronous mode. The system defends against buffer overflow and use-after-free vulnerabilities and protects against side-channel attacks. Apple describes it as an industry-first always-on memory safety protection that does not compromise performance.

The M5 Pro and M5 Max integrate dedicated Thunderbolt 5 controllers on-chip, with each port backed by its own controller to allow full simultaneous bandwidth across all ports. The base M5 uses Thunderbolt 4. The base M5 supports Wi-Fi 6E and Bluetooth 5.3, but all variants can support Wi-Fi 7 and Bluetooth 6, in addition to Thread, when paired with Apple's N1 wireless networking chip

== Fusion Architecture ==
The M5 Pro and M5 Max are built using the Apple-designed Fusion Architecture, a first for Apple silicon. Previous Apple silicon chips, including the base M5, use a single-die design; the Fusion Architecture instead bonds two third-generation 3-nanometer dies into a single SoC using advanced packaging with high-bandwidth, low-latency interconnects.

The two dies collectively house the CPU, GPU, Media Engine, Neural Engine, unified memory controller, and Thunderbolt 5 capabilities. This approach allows Apple to scale core counts and memory bandwidth beyond the limits of a single die while preserving the unified memory architecture that the CPU, GPU, and Neural Engine share. Multi-die designs using similar concepts have been employed in processors from Intel and AMD, though Apple's implementation is integrated into a unified-memory SoC rather than a discrete CPU or GPU package.

== Performance ==
Apple's claimed performance improvements, based on internal benchmarks conducted in September 2025 (for M5) and February 2026 (for M5 Pro and M5 Max), are summarized below.

M5 (vs. M4):

- CPU multithreaded performance: up to 15% faster
- Overall GPU performance: up to 30% faster
- Ray-tracing GPU performance: up to 45% faster
- Peak GPU AI compute: over 4× faster

M5 Pro (vs. M4 Pro):

- CPU multithreaded performance: up to 30% faster
- Overall GPU performance: up to 20% faster
- Ray-tracing GPU performance: up to 35% faster
- Peak GPU AI compute: over 4× faster
- LLM prompt processing: up to 3.9× faster

M5 Max (vs. M4 Max):

- CPU multithreaded performance: up to 15% faster
- Overall GPU performance: up to 20% faster
- Ray-tracing GPU performance: up to 30% faster
- Peak GPU AI compute: over 4× faster
- LLM prompt processing: up to 4× faster

== Products ==
=== M5 ===
- iPad Pro (M5)
- MacBook Pro (14-inch, M5)
- Apple Vision Pro (M5)
- MacBook Air (13-inch and 15-inch, M5)

=== M5 Pro ===
- MacBook Pro (14-inch and 16-inch, M5 Pro)
- Mac Mini (M5 Pro)
- MacBook Pro with PROLED XDR Display (M5 Pro)

=== M5 Max ===
- MacBook Pro (14-inch and 16-inch, M5 Max)
- Mac Studio (M5 Max)
- MacBook Pro with PROLED XDR Display (M5 Max)

=== M5 Ultra ===
- Mac Studio (M5 Ultra)

== Variants ==
Apple M5 series configurations
| Variant | CPU | | | GPU | | NPU | | Memory | | | | Architecture | Used in |
| Variant | S cores | P cores | E cores | Cores | Neural accelerators | Cores | Performance | RAM (MT/s) | Controllers | Bandwidth (GB/s) | Size (GB) | Architecture | Used in |
|---|---|---|---|---|---|---|---|---|---|---|---|---|---|
| M5 | 3 | —N/a | 6 | 10 | 10 | 16 | 42 TOPS | LPDDR5X-9600 | 8 | 153.6 | 12 | Single die | iPad Pro (256–512GB) |
| M5 | 4 | —N/a | 6 | 8 | 8 | 16 | 42 TOPS | LPDDR5X-9600 | 8 | 153.6 | 16, 24, or 32 | Single die | MacBook Air |
| M5 | 4 | —N/a | 6 | 10 | 10 | 16 | 42 TOPS | LPDDR5X-9600 | 8 | 153.6 | 16, 24, or 32 | Single die | iPad Pro (1–2TB); MacBook Air; MacBook Pro (14") |
| M5 Pro | 5 | 10 | —N/a | 16 | 16 | 16 | 42 TOPS | LPDDR5X-9600 | 16 | 307.2 | 24 or 48 | Fusion (dual-die) | MacBook Pro (14") |
| M5 Pro | 5 | 10 | —N/a | 16 | 16 | 16 | 42 TOPS | LPDDR5X-9600 | 16 | 307.2 | 24, 48, or 64 | Fusion (dual-die) | Mac Mini |
| M5 Pro | 6 | 12 | —N/a | 20 | 20 | 16 | 42 TOPS | LPDDR5X-9600 | 16 | 307.2 | 24, 48, or 64 | Fusion (dual-die) | Mac Mini; MacBook Pro |
| M5 Max | 6 | 12 | —N/a | 32 | 32 | 16 | 42 TOPS | LPDDR5X-9600 | 24 | 460.8 | 36 | Fusion (dual-die) | Mac Studio; MacBook Pro |
| M5 Max | 6 | 12 | —N/a | 40 | 40 | 16 | 42 TOPS | LPDDR5X-9600 | 32 | 614.4 | 48, 64, or 128 | Fusion (dual-die) | Mac Studio; MacBook Pro |
| M5 Ultra | 10 | 20 | —N/a | 64 | 64 | 32 | 84 TOPS | LPDDR5X-9600 | 64 | 1,228.8 | 96, 256 or 512 | UltraFusion (quad-die) | Mac Studio |
| M5 Ultra | 12 | 24 | —N/a | 80 | 80 | 32 | 84 TOPS | LPDDR5X-9600 | 64 | 1,228.8 | 96, 256 or 512 | UltraFusion (quad-die) | Mac Studio |

== See also ==
- Apple silicon
- Apple M4
- System on a chip
