= IPad Pro (M5) =

Tablet computer developed by Apple in 2025

iPad Pro (M5)

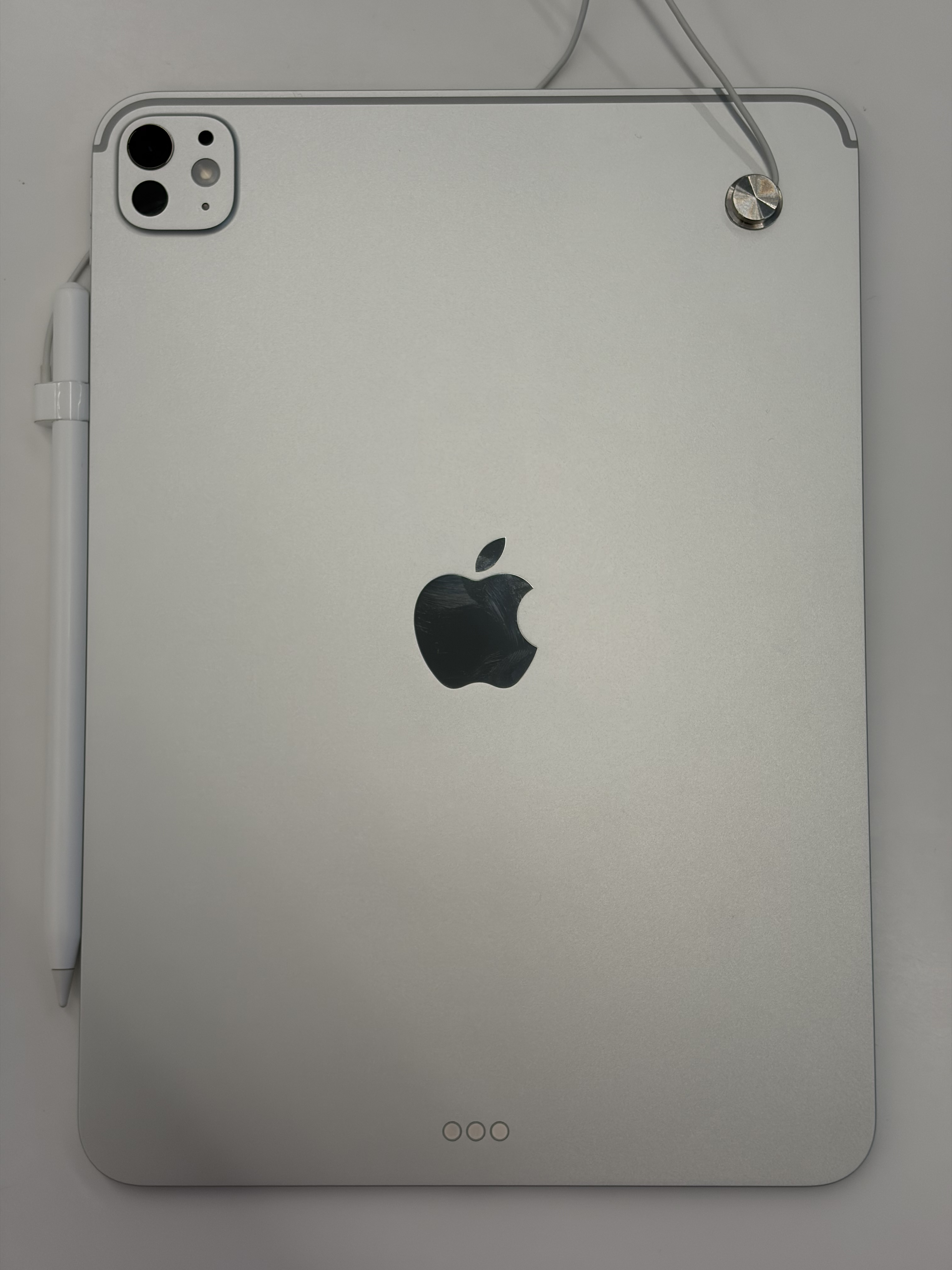
- 11-inch iPad Pro M5 with Apple Pencil Pro
- Also known as: iPad Pro 11" (6th generation) and iPad Pro 13" (8th generation)
- Developer: Apple
- Product family: iPad Pro
- Type: Tablet computer
- Generation: 8th
- Released: October 22, 2025; 13 months ago
- Operating system: Original: iPadOS 26.0; Current: iPadOS 27.2.1, released November 9, 2026
- System on a chip: Apple M5
- Memory: 12 or 16 GB LPDDR5X RAM (Note: Models under 1 TB storage have 12 GB RAM, and those with 1 or 2 TB have 16 GB RAM.)
- Storage: 256 GB, 512 GB, 1 TB or 2 TB
- Graphics: 10 core 8th generation Apple-designed GPU
- Camera: 12 MP wide and 12 MP landscape front-facing ultrawide
- Connectivity: Wi-Fi 7 with 2x2 MIMO and Simultaneous dual band, Bluetooth 6, Thread; Wi-Fi + Cellular models 5G (sub‑6 GHz) with 4x4 MIMO, Gigabit LTE with 4x4 MIMO and LAA
- Power: 11-inch: Built-in 31.29-watt-hour rechargeable lithium-polymer battery 13-inch: Built-in 38.99-watt-hour rechargeable lithium-polymer battery
- Dimensions: 13-inch: 281.6 mm (11.09 in) (h); 215.5 mm (8.48 in) (w); 5.1 mm (0.20 in) (d); 11-inch: 249.7 mm (9.83 in) (h); 177.5 mm (6.99 in) (w); 5.3 mm (0.21 in) (d)
- Weight: 13-inch Wi-Fi: 579 g (1.28 pounds); 13-inch Wi-Fi + Cellular: 582 g (1.28 pounds); 11-inch Wi-Fi: 444 g (0.98 pounds); 11-inch Wi-Fi + Cellular: 446 g (0.98 pounds)
- Predecessor: iPad Pro (M4)
- Website: www.apple.com/ipad-pro/

The ipad pro uses the same screen sizes and design from the previous generation, with Space Black and Silver color options carried over from the prior lineup.

Key improvements include an update to the processor from Apple M4 to M5, increased default RAM to 12 GB for base models (with 1 TB and 2 TB models retaining 16 GB), and 45% improved graphics performance. The M5 variant also features enhanced memory bandwidth of 153 GB/s compared to 120 GB/s on the M4 and up to two times faster storage read and write speed, along with upgraded wireless connectivity including Wi-Fi 7, Bluetooth 6, and support for Thread networking technology. The display now dims to 1 nit minimum brightness.

== Features ==
=== Hardware ===
The iPad Pro (M5) maintains the same exterior design to the previous generation while featuring significant internal upgrades. The processor was updated to Apple's M5 chip, which was announced on the same day as the iPad Pro.

The M5 chip features a nine-core or 10-core CPU depending on storage configuration. Base models with 256 GB and 512 GB storage include a nine-core CPU with three super cores (previously known as performance cores) and six efficiency cores, paired with 12 GB of LPDDR5X-9600 RAM. Higher-tier models with 1 TB or 2 TB storage feature a 10-core CPU with four super cores and six efficiency cores, accompanied by 16 GB of LPDDR5X-9600 RAM. All variants include a 10-core GPU with hardware-accelerated ray tracing, a 16-core Neural Engine with Neural Accelerators, and 153 GB/s memory bandwidth.

==== Display ====
Both models feature a Tandem OLED Ultra Retina XDR display with ProMotion technology supporting adaptive refresh rates from 10 Hz to 120 Hz. The 11-inch model offers a 2420-by-1668 pixel resolution at 264 ppi, while the 13-inch model provides 2752-by-2064 pixels at 264 ppi. Both displays feature a 2,000,000:1 contrast ratio, support for Apple Pencil Pro and Apple Pencil (USB-C) with hover functionality, and a minimum brightness of 1 nit. High-end models (1 TB and 2 TB) include an optional nano-texture display glass for reduced glare and reflections.

==== Camera system ====
The iPad Pro (M5) features identical camera specifications to the model with M4, with a 12 MP wide camera on the rear and a 12 MP landscape-oriented Center Stage camera on the front. Both of the M5 models support 4K video recording at up to 60 fps and advanced features such as ProRes recording and portrait mode.

==== Audio and calling ====
The device features four speaker audio and a studio-quality four-microphone array. The M5 model introduces enhanced video calling with local capture functionality and support for relaying cellular calls from a nearby iPhone using the Phone app. Standard features include FaceTime, Center Stage, SharePlay, screen sharing, and Portrait mode.

==== Battery ====
The 11-inch model includes a 31.29-watt-hour battery, while the 13-inch features a 38.99-watt-hour battery, both providing approximately 10 hours of web browsing or video playback on Wi-Fi. A new feature for the M5 is fast-charge capability, achieving up to 50% charge in approximately 30 minutes with a 40 W Dynamic Power Adapter or any USB-C power adapter capable of delivering 60 W or higher.

=== Software ===
The iPad Pro (M5) ships with iPadOS 26.0, which introduced new multitasking features and a redesigned interface called Liquid Glass. The device is compatible with Apple Pencil Pro, Apple Pencil (USB-C), and the previous generations' Magic Keyboard.

=== Connectivity ===
The iPad Pro (M5) features Wi-Fi 7 (802.11be) with 2x2 MIMO and simultaneous dual-band operation, an upgrade from the Wi-Fi 6E standard in the previous generation. It supports Bluetooth 6 and includes the Apple N1 wireless networking chip. The device also introduces support for Thread networking technology for enhanced smart home connectivity.

Wi-Fi + Cellular models include the Apple C1X cellular modem and support for 5G (sub-6 GHz) with 4x4 MIMO and Gigabit LTE with 4x4 MIMO. The device uses eSIM technology and is not compatible with physical SIM cards. Only Wi-Fi + Cellular models include GPS/GNSS.

The M5 also supports external display connectivity via Thunderbolt/USB 4, with capability for one external display at up to 6K resolution at 60 Hz or up to 4K resolution at 120 Hz.

== Design and colors ==
The iPad Pro (M5) maintains the same form factor as the M4 model but omitted the engraved iPad Pro wordmark from the back. It is available in two sizes (11-inch and 13-inch) and two finish options: Silver and Space Black. The tablet's thickness, measuring 5.1 mm for the 13-inch and 5.3 mm for the 11-inch model, is preserved from the previous generation.

== Timeline ==
Timeline of iPad models
See also: List of Apple products

Source: Apple Newsroom Archive.
