= Apple M6 =

System-on-a-chip series designed by Apple Inc.

General information
- Launched: September 22, 2026; 60 days ago
- Designed by: Apple
- Common manufacturer: TSMC

Physical specifications
- Cores: 12 (2 S + 4 P + 6 E)
- Memory (RAM): 16, 24 or 32 GB
- GPU: 12 cores
- Co-processor: NPU: dual 16-core

Architecture and classification
- Application: Mac Mini
- Technology node: 2 nm (N2)

History
- Predecessor: Apple M5

The Apple M6 is an ARM-based system on a chip (SoC) created by Apple Inc., part of the Apple silicon family. It was announced on August 25, 2026, succeeding the Apple M5, and it was released on September 22, 2026. Each chip integrates a central processing unit (CPU), graphics processing unit (GPU), neural processing unit (NPU), and unified memory in a single package.

The M6 is the first Apple silicon chip to be manufactured using TSMC's 2 nm process.

== History ==
On June 25, 2026, Bloomberg reported that Apple planned to skip the M6 Pro and M6 Max variants, instead focusing on developing higher-end chips as part of the M7 system-on-chip generation. The move was reportedly intended to accelerate the introduction of technologies designed to improve on-device artificial intelligence capabilities and graphics performance. Consequently, the M6 is expected to be limited to entry-level Macs, making it the first Apple silicon generation to launch with only a base chip.

On August 25, 2026, Apple announced the M6 as the successor to the Apple M5.

== Design ==
Apple M series comparison
Chip	CPU cores			GPU cores	RAM options (GB)	Displays	Memory bandwidth (GB/s)	Introduced
Chip	S	P	E	GPU cores	RAM options (GB)	Displays	Memory bandwidth (GB/s)	Introduced
M1	—N/a	4	4	8	8/16	2	68	2020
M2	—N/a	4	4	10	8/16/24	2	102	2022
M3	—N/a	4	4	10	8/16/24	2	102	2023
M4	—N/a	4	6	10	16/24/32	3	120	2024
M5	4	—N/a	6	10	16/24/32	3	153	2025
M6	2	4	6	12	16	3	153	2026
M6	2	4	6	12	24/32	3	170	2026

=== CPU ===
The M6 CPU features two super cores, four performance cores and six efficiency cores, for a total of 12 cores. It has a total of around 46 billion transistors.

=== GPU ===
The M6 GPU features 12 cores and includes Neural Accelerators for artificial intelligence workloads, which Apple says provide a 30% improvement over the M5.

Apple also introduced changes to the shader-core architecture, hardware-accelerated ray tracing and Dynamic Caching.

=== Neural Engine ===
The M6 includes a dual 16-core Neural Engine, which Apple claims provides twice the performance for AI-related tasks compared with previous Apple silicon chips.

=== Memory ===
The base model Mac Mini with M6 includes 16 GB of unified memory and can be configured with up to 32 GB.

The M6 provides increased memory bandwidth compared with the M5, supporting faster movement of data for AI and other demanding workloads. Apple rates peak unified memory bandwidth at up to 170 GB/s.

In October 2026, Apple announced the 14-inch (360 mm) MacBook Pro with the Apple M6 chip, the dual 16-core Neural Engine, and the N1 chip with Wi-Fi 7, Bluetooth 6, and comparable memory performance to the Mac Mini. It adds support for up to two external displays at 4K resolution at 165 Hz, up from 144 Hz.

=== Media Engine ===
The M6 also includes a Media Engine with enhancements to video encoding and decoding.

- Hardware-accelerated H.264, HEVC, ProRes, and ProRes RAW
- Video decode engine
- Video encode engine
- ProRes encode and decode engine
- AV1 decode

=== Additional features ===
The M6 chip has support for Apple Intelligence, as well as a new and improved AI model for Siri.

== Products ==
=== M6 ===
- Mac Mini (M6, 2026)
- MacBook Pro (M6, 2026)
- iMac (M6, 2026)

== Variants ==
Apple M6 series configurations
Variant	CPU cores			GPU cores	Memory			Architecture	Used in
Variant	S	P	E	GPU cores	Controllers	Bandwidth (GB/s)	Size (GB)	Architecture	Used in
M6	2	3	5	10	8	153.6	16	Single die	iMac (2-port)
M6	2	3	5	10	8	170	24	Single die	iMac (2-port)
M6	2	4	6	12	8	153.6	16	Single die	iMac (4-port) Mac Mini; MacBook Pro (14")
M6	2	4	6	12	8	170	24 or 32	Single die	iMac (4-port) Mac Mini; MacBook Pro (14")

== See also ==
- Apple silicon
- Apple M5
- Apple A20 Pro
- System on a chip
