= IPadOS 27 =

2026 tablet operating system by Apple

iPadOS 27
- Version of the iPadOS operating system

- iPadOS 27 running on an 13-inch iPad Air
- Developer: Apple
- Source model: Closed with open-source components
- General availability: September 14, 2026; 2 months ago
- Latest release: 27.2.1 (November 9, 2026; 11 days ago) [±]
- Marketing target: iPads
- Available in: 55 languages
- List of languages Arabic, Bengali, Bulgarian, Catalan, Chinese Simplified, Chinese Traditional (Hong Kong), Chinese Traditional (Taiwan), Croatian, Czech, Danish, Dutch, English (Australia), English (India), English (United Kingdom), English (United States), Finnish, French (Canada), French (France), German, Greek, Gujarati, Hebrew, Hindi, Hungarian, Indonesian, Italian, Japanese, Kannada, Kazakh, Korean, Lithuanian, Malay, Malayalam, Marathi, Norwegian, Odia, Polish, Portuguese (Brazil), Portuguese (Portugal), Punjabi, Romanian, Russian, Slovak, Slovenian, Spanish (Latin America), Spanish (Spain), Spanish (United States), Swedish, Tamil, Telugu, Thai, Turkish, Ukrainian, Urdu, Vietnamese
- Default user interface: Liquid Glass
- Preceded by: iPadOS 26
- Official website: apple.com/os/ipados/

Support status
- Supported

Articles in the series

iPadOS 27 is the eighth and current major release of iPadOS, Apple's operating system for the iPad. The successor to iPadOS 26, it was announced on June 8, 2026, at the annual Worldwide Developers Conference (WWDC) alongside iOS 27, macOS Golden Gate, watchOS 27, visionOS 27, and tvOS 27. It was released on September 14, 2026.

== New features and changes ==
=== System features ===
==== Apple Intelligence ====
Apple expanded visual intelligence to the iPad, allowing users to learn from what is shown on the iPad screen and highlight specific information using Apple Pencil. Resource-heavy features such as image generation are subject to daily usage limits. Larger allowances are available to subscribers of paid iCloud+ tiers, while most Apple Intelligence features remain free of charge.

On iPad models with the M4 chip or later with at least 12 GB of RAM, users can set a custom voice for Siri, have improved dictation, and on-device models.

==== Siri AI ====
iPadOS 27 introduces Siri AI, a rebuilt Siri powered by Apple Intelligence, that uses generative artificial intelligence (AI) models and behaves more like a conversational chatbot. It can hold back-and-forth conversations, draw on personal information from apps such as Mail, Messages, Notes, Reminders and Calendar, answer questions using web search, and respond to what is shown on screen. Siri can also carry out multi-step actions within apps, such as drafting emails, adding events to Calendar, and adding photographs to an album.

A standalone Siri app allows users to see a history of past conversations. Siri appears at the top of the iPad's display; swiping down from the top of the screen opens a combined "Search or Ask" interface that replaces the Spotlight search interface. The search index was rebuilt for Siri AI so users can find content faster and bring up more relevant results.

Files and photos can be uploaded into the new Siri app.

Users can ask Siri about the text and images they have selected. The new "Write with Siri" feature allows Siri to generate its own text, correct grammar, or give feedback on their writing. It can also write in a user's specific style, including in handwritten notes.

Siri AI is not available at launch in the European Union or China while Apple works through regulatory requirements.

==== AirPods ====
Apple redesigned the AirPods settings UI in iPadOS 27, adding a custom equalizer that lets users adjust lows, mids, and highs.

==== Parental controls ====
iPadOS 27 introduces a redesigned Screen Time interface and several new child-safety features. Parents can set Time Allowances across app categories such as entertainment, games, and social media, and create schedules that determine which apps are available at different times of day, with recommendations based on a child's age and guidance from child-development experts. The "Ask to Browse" feature requires children to obtain a guardian's approval before visiting a new website, and parents can require approval before a child communicates with a new contact in Messages or FaceTime.

==== Other system changes ====
A Liquid Glass slider in the settings allows users to adjust the translucency of the system interface. Apple revised the Liquid Glass design introduced in iPadOS 26 to improve readability. Apple also described general performance and responsiveness improvements across the system.

The iPad's status bar now displays the name of the app a user is on, and the menu bar can be accessed by tapping on or hovering the cursor over the app name. Users can enable the option to persistently display the menu bar. iPhone apps optimized for iPadOS can be resized.

=== App features ===
==== Photos ====
The Photos app gains generative photo-editing tools. The Clean Up feature was improved to become better at removing objects and filling in missing areas. The Reframe option changes the perspective and composition of a photo, while Extend generatively changes the size of the image. iCloud Shared Albums add full-resolution sharing, a 30-day expiration option, and the ability for users on Android and Windows devices to contribute images. Other new features include a "Captured By Me" collection, support for keywords and star ratings, and the ability to save a video frame as a photo.

==== Safari and Passwords ====
Safari uses Apple Intelligence to automatically organize open tabs, bookmarks, and the Reading List into related topics. Users can generate custom browser extensions from natural-language prompts, and a "Notify Me" feature monitors a webpage and alerts the user when its content changes. The Passwords app can use Apple Intelligence to navigate a website, sign in, and replace a weak or compromised password with a stronger one automatically.

==== Phone and Messages ====
The Phone app adds Call Context, which surfaces on-device information during a call, such as a flight number when contacting an airline. In the Messages app, sending large photos and videos no longer delays accompanying text messages, outgoing messages show a send indicator, Tapback notifications are consolidated, and Apple Intelligence suggests actions such as inserting a photo or sharing a location.

==== Image Playground ====
Image Playground was overhauled to generate images in any style, including photorealistic results, and to allow edits through text descriptions or touch gestures. Genmoji creation was made faster and better quality. Users can also use Image Playground to create wallpapers, contact posters, and images for social media with different aspect ratio options.

==== Other apps ====
The Calendar and Reminders apps support natural-language input for creating and editing events and tasks, and the Shortcuts app can generate a shortcut from a natural-language description. The Journal app adds generative writing prompts for inspiration. HomeKit Secure Video in the Home app supports 4K resolution and generatively summarizes activities from video footages.

== Supported devices ==
iPadOS 27 drops support for all devices with the A12 or A12X chip, including the eighth-generation iPad, fifth-generation iPad mini, third-generation iPad Air, first-generation 11-inch iPad Pro, and third-generation 12.9-inch iPad Pro. However, the fourth-generation iPad Pro, which uses the A12Z chip, will remain supported.

iPadOS 27 drops support for every remaining iPad with a white bezel, those being the eighth-generation iPad, fifth-generation iPad Mini, and third-generation iPad Air. It is the first iPadOS version to drop support for an iPad with an 11-inch display, USB-C port, no headphone jack, Face ID, and no Home button. The ninth-generation iPad is the only supported iPad with a 10.2-inch display, home button, Lightning port, and headphone jack.

Apple Intelligence features require at least an A17 Pro or M1 chip, as found on the iPad Mini (A17 Pro), iPad Air (5th generation), iPad Pro (5th generation), or newer. Even though devices may support Apple Intelligence, features such as improved Siri voices and improved on-device dictation are only available on iPad Mini (A20 Pro) and iPad models with the M4 chip or later with at least 12 GB of unified memory.

iPads that support iPadOS 27 are:

Supported device	Chipset	Release year	RAM	Apple Intelligence support	Improved on-device model
iPad (9th generation)	A13	2021	3 GB	No	No
iPad (10th generation)	A14	2022	4 GB	No	No
iPad (A16)	A16	2025	6 GB	No	No
iPad Mini (6th generation)	A15	2021	4 GB	No	No
iPad Mini (A17 Pro)	A17 Pro	2024	8 GB	Yes	No
iPad Mini (A20 Pro)	A20 Pro	2026	12 GB	Yes	Yes
iPad Air (4th generation)	A14	2020	4 GB	No	No
iPad Air (5th generation)	M1	2022	8 GB	Yes	No
iPad Air (M2)	M2	2024	8 GB	Yes	No
iPad Air (M3)	M3	2025	8 GB	Yes	No
iPad Air (M4)	M4	2026	12 GB	Yes	Yes
iPad Pro (4th generation)	A12Z	2020	6 GB	No	No
iPad Pro (5th generation)	M1	2021	8 GB or 16 GB	Yes	No
iPad Pro (6th generation)	M2	2022	8 GB or 16 GB	Yes	No
iPad Pro (M4)	M4	2024	8 GB or 16 GB	Yes	Models with 16 GB RAM
iPad Pro (M5)	M5	2025	12 GB or 16 GB	Yes	Yes

== Version history ==
The first developer beta of iPadOS 27 was released on June 8, 2026.

iPadOS 27 version history
Version	Build number	Release date	Notes
27.0	24A7427	—N/a	Preinstalled on iPad mini (A20 Pro) models
27.0	24A437	September 14, 2026	
27.0.1	24A446	September 28, 2026	
27.2	24B119	October 26, 2026	
27.2	24B8120	October 26, 2026	Day 1 update for iPad mini (A20 Pro) models
27.2.1	24B156	November 9, 2026	
27.2.1	24B8156	November 9, 2026	iPad mini (A20 Pro) models only
27.3 beta 2 v2	24C5049f	November 19, 2026	
Legend: Unsupported Latest version Preview version
