= IPadOS =

Mobile operating system for iPad tablets

iPadOS

- Screenshot of iPadOS 27
- Developer: Apple
- Written in: C, C++, Objective-C, Swift, assembly language
- OS family: Unix-like, based on Darwin (BSD), iOS, macOS
- Working state: Current
- Source model: Closed with open-source components
- Initial release: September 24, 2019; 7 years ago
- Latest release: 27.2.1 (November 9, 2026; 3 days ago) [±]
- Marketing target: Tablet computers
- Available in: 40 languages
- Update method: Over-the-air, iTunes, Finder
- Supported platforms: ARMv9-A (17.4–present); ARMv8-A (13.0–present)
- Kernel type: Hybrid (XNU)
- Default user interface: Cocoa Touch (multi-touch, GUI)
- License: Proprietary software except for open-source components
- Preceded by: iOS
- Official website: apple.com/os/ipados

Articles in the series

iPadOS is a proprietary mobile operating system created and developed by Apple for its iPad line of tablet computers. It was given a name distinct from iOS, the operating system used by Apple's iPhones, to reflect the diverging features of the two product lines, such as multitasking. The operating system was introduced as iPadOS 13, reflecting its status as the successor to iOS 12 for the iPad, and first released to the public on September 24, 2019. Major versions of iPadOS are released annually; the current stable version, iPadOS 27.2.1, was released to the public on November 9, 2026.

== History ==
The first iPad was introduced on April 3, 2010, and ran iPhone OS 3.2, which added support for the larger device to the operating system, previously only used on the iPhone and its smaller counterpart, the iPod touch. This shared operating system was rebranded as iOS with the release of iOS 4 in June 2010.

The operating system initially had rough feature parity running on the iPhone, iPod Touch, and iPad, with variations in user interface depending on screen size, and minor differences in the selection of apps included. However, over time, the variant of iOS for the iPad incorporated a growing set of differentiating features, such as picture-in-picture, the ability to display multiple running apps simultaneously (both introduced with iOS 9 in 2015), drag and drop, and a dock that more closely resembled the dock from macOS than the one on the iPhone (added in 2017 with iOS 11). Standard iPad apps were increasingly designed to support the optional use of a physical keyboard.

To emphasize the different feature set available on the iPad, and to signal their intention to develop the platforms in divergent directions, at the Worldwide Developers Conference (WWDC) 2019, Apple announced that the variant of iOS that runs on the iPad would be rebranded as "iPadOS"., The home screen now accommodates more icon space and stronger multitasking features. The new naming strategy began with iPadOS 13.1, in 2019.

On June 22, 2020, at WWDC 2020, Apple announced iPadOS 14, with more macOS-like designs for search, Siri, calls, app designs and handwriting recognition, better AR features, enhanced privacy protections, and app widgets. iPadOS 14 was released to the public on September 16, 2020.

On June 7, 2021, at WWDC 2021, iPadOS 15 was announced with widgets on the Home Screen and App Library, the same features that came to iPhone with iOS 14 in 2020. The update also brought stricter privacy measurements with Safari such as IP Address blocking so other websites cannot see it. iPadOS 15 was released to the public on September 20, 2021.

On June 6, 2022, at WWDC 2022, iPadOS 16 was announced with a Weather app and Stage Manager, along with most of the features included in iOS 16, excluding a customizable lock screen.

On June 5, 2023, at WWDC 2023, Apple announced iPadOS 17 with support for widgets for the lock screen, a feature originally launched with iOS 16, along with the majority of features announced included in iOS 17. In addition, iPadOS 17 now includes the Apple Health app.

On June 10, 2024, at WWDC 2024, Apple announced iPadOS 18.

On June 9, 2025, at WWDC 2025, Apple announced iPadOS 26, bringing it much closer to macOS, introducing the menu bar, stronger multitasking with traffic lights and a more consistent UI to macOS due to the Liquid Glass design language.

On June 8, 2026, at WWDC 2026, Apple announced iPadOS 27.

== Features ==
Many features of iPadOS are also available on iOS; however, iPadOS contains some features and apps that are not available in iOS and lacks some features and apps that are available in iOS.

=== iPadOS 14 ===
==== Scribble ====
Introduced in iPadOS 14, Scribble converts text handwritten by an Apple Pencil into typed text in most text fields.

=== iPadOS 15 ===
==== Widgets ====
Beginning with iPadOS 15, widgets can be placed on the home screen.

==== Translate ====
Beginning with iPadOS 15, the Translate app is available on iPad. The feature was announced on June 7, 2021, at WWDC 2021.

=== iPadOS 16 ===
==== Weather ====
Beginning with iPadOS 16, the Weather app was added to iPad. The application had previously only been available on the iPhone and iPod Touch. The feature was announced on June 6, 2022, at WWDC 2022.

==== Stage Manager ====
iPadOS 16 adds a new feature called Stage Manager that automatically sorts windows by app.

=== iPadOS 17 ===
==== Lock Screen ====
iPadOS 17 allows users to personalize their Lock Screens with widgets and fonts. Interactive widgets can be placed on both the Lock Screen and Home Screen for quick access to customizable information, such as weather and reminders.

==== Health ====
The introduction of the Health app on iPad provides a central location to view and manage health data.

==== Messages and FaceTime ====
New communication features for Messages and FaceTime were introduced, such as audio messages (like a voicemail) if a call is not answered on FaceTime, and using an Apple TV for FaceTime calls with an iPad acting as a camera. Messages introduces the combining of search filters and content types when users search through messages, as well as transcriptions for audio messages.

==== Accessibility ====
New accessibility features such as Screen Distance and improved Voice Control expand usability options for a wider range of users.

==== App updates ====
Several core apps receive updates, including Photos, Safari, Notes, and Reminders, bringing new functionality and improvements to enhance the overall iPad experience.

=== iPadOS 18 ===
iPadOS 18 introduces Apple Intelligence with artificial intelligence (AI) capabilities. Users can place apps and widgets anywhere on the Home Screen, and set a dark-themed or tinted look for app icons. The Calculator app for iPad was introduced. The Control Center was redesigned to be customizable with resizable buttons, shortcuts, and functions. Users can set apps to be locked or hidden; accessing such apps requires passcode or biometric authentication.

=== iPadOS 26 ===
iPadOS 26 has a new Liquid Glass design, new apps including Phone, Games, Journal and Preview, and a windowing system similar to macOS for multitasking. Folder icons are also more customizable.

=== iPadOS 27 ===
iPadOS 27 introduces Siri AI, alongside new features and enhancements to Apple Intelligence and child-safety features.
