= IPad Pro (5th generation) =

2021 Apple tablet computers

iPad Pro (M1)

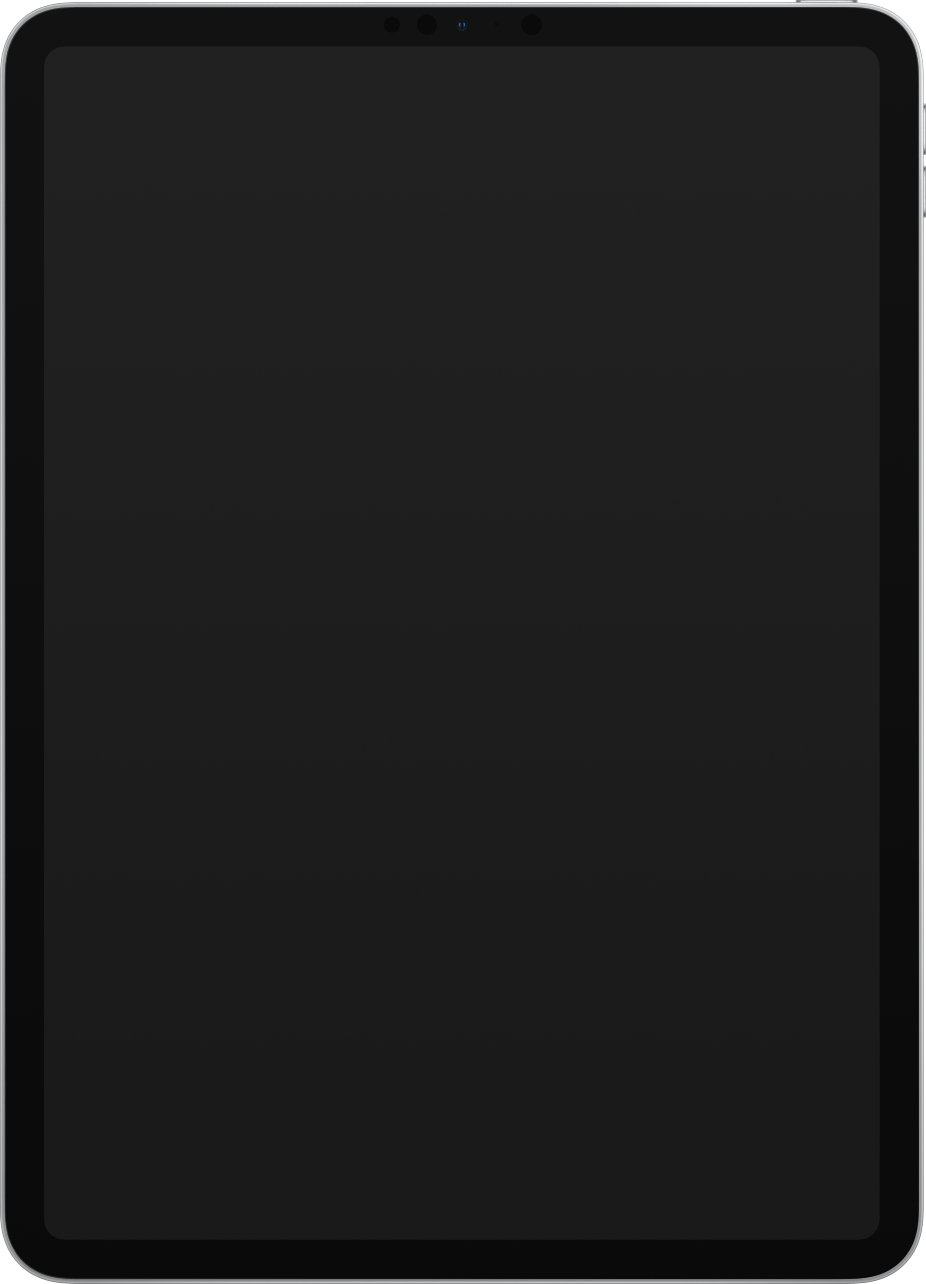
- Also known as: iPad Pro (5th Generation) iPad Pro 5 iPad Pro 11-inch (3rd generation) iPad Pro 12.9-inch (5th generation)
- Developer: Apple Inc.
- Manufacturer: Foxconn (on contract)
- Product family: iPad Pro
- Type: Tablet computer
- Generation: 5th
- Released: May 21, 2021; 5 years ago
- Introductory price: 11": $799US; 12.9": $1,099US
- Discontinued: October 18, 2022; 4 years ago
- Operating system: Original: iPadOS 14.5; Current: iPadOS 27.2, released October 26, 2026
- System on a chip: Apple M1
- Memory: 8 GB, 16 GB RAM
- Storage: 128 GB, 256 GB, 512 GB, 1 TB, 2 TB
- Display: 11-inch (28 cm) (2,388 x 1,668) px (264 ppi), 600-nits Max Brightness, Wide-Color Display (P3), True Tone Display, and Fully Laminated Display; 12.9-inch (33 cm) (2,732 x 2,048) px (264 ppi), 600-nits Max Brightness, Wide-Color Display (P3), True Tone Display, and Fully Laminated Display, and XDR brightness: 1,000 nits max full screen, 1,600 nits peak
- Sound: 4 speaker audio
- Connectivity: Wi-Fi 6, Bluetooth 5, 5G for Cellular version
- Dimensions: 12.9-inch: 280.6 mm (11.05 in) (h); 214.9 mm (8.46 in) (w); 6.4 mm (0.25 in) (d); 11-inch: 247.6 mm (9.75 in) (h); 178.5 mm (7.03 in) (w); 5.9 mm (0.23 in) (d)
- Weight: 11" Wi-Fi : 1.03 pounds (466 grams); Wi-Fi + Cellular : 1.04 pounds (470 grams); 12.9" Wi-Fi : 1.5 pounds (682 grams); Wi-Fi + Cellular : 1.51 pounds (685 grams)
- Predecessor: iPad Pro (4th generation)
- Successor: iPad Pro (M2)
- Website: www.apple.com/ipad-pro/

The fifth-generation iPad Pro, colloquially known as the M1 iPad Pro, is a line of tablet computers developed and marketed by Apple as part of their iPad brand. It was announced on April 20, 2021, and was available in 11-inch (28 cm) and 12.9-inch (33 cm) screen size options, which are the same as its predecessor, the iPad Pro (4th generation). Preorders began on April 30, 2021, and the product was released worldwide on May 21, 2021. It comes in two colors: Silver and Space Gray.

Significant upgrades over the previous generation include the new Apple M1 processor, the addition of 5G support in cellular models, support for Thunderbolt 3 and USB4, and for the 12.9-inch model, a new mini LED-based Liquid Retina XDR display. The 11-inch model is the third generation of that size, and describes itself as such.

== History ==
The tech community was divided on whether Apple would use the M1 chip or a hypothetical A14X chip for its fifth generation iPad Pro. After Apple announced that it would use the M1, speculation surfaced that it might run macOS. The iPad's general availability was temporarily constrained by an ongoing chip shortage of 2020 and 2021.

== General ==
In spite of minor differences in weight and thickness due to hardware upgrades, the tablet is virtually identical to its predecessor. Weight of the 12.9-inch model has increased from 641 grams to 682 grams, while that of the 11-inch model has decreased from 471 grams to 466 grams. It is compatible with the second generation Apple Pencil and the Magic Keyboard; Apple designed a revised variant of Magic Keyboard for the 12.9-inch model due to its change in thickness.

The iPad Pro uses 100% recycled aluminum and sources at least 98% recycled rare earth element supplies. It is free of any harmful substances, as defined by Apple's proprietary "Apple Regulated Substances Specification".

== Features ==
=== Hardware ===
The fifth generation iPad Pro uses an Apple M1 SoC, which is the first iPad to utilize an M-series processor (found on the first Apple silicon Mac desktops and notebooks released in the late 2020) rather than an A-series processor. The M1 features an eight-core CPU in a hybrid configuration with four high-performance and four high-efficiency cores, an eight-core GPU, and a 16-core Neural Engine. The cellular model supports mmWave 5G and allows speeds up to 4 Gbit/s in ideal conditions. Internal storage options include 128 GB, 256 GB, 512 GB, 1 TB and 2 TB. The 128, 256, and 512 GB versions includes 8 GB of RAM, while the 1 and 2 TB versions include 16 GB of RAM.

The fifth generation iPad Pro debuted support of Thunderbolt 3 and USB4 with its USB-C port. The latter can transfer data at up to 40 gigabits per second and can be used to connect external displays, such as the Pro Display XDR. The 11-inch model has a Liquid Retina display with a peak brightness at 600 nits, which is the same as the 11-inch model of the 3rd and 4th generations. The 12.9-inch model, in contrast, boasts a mini LED HDR display called the Liquid Retina XDR display built in with a 1,000,000:1 contrast ratio, full-screen brightness of 1,000 nits and a peak brightness of 1,600 nits (HDR). Both models support True Tone, ProMotion, 120 Hz variable refresh rate, and P3 wide color gamut.

It supports a dual camera system in the back. In addition to a 12 MP wide camera with an aperture of ƒ/1.8, it has a 10 MP ultra-wide camera with a ƒ/2.4 aperture and a 125º field of view. A brighter True Tone flash is also included. It features an ultra-wide 12 MP 122º-field front-facing camera that enables Apple's "Center Stage" technology, which pinpoints the positions of the users and automatically tracks the camera view accordingly, to perspectivally center them. The Wide Cameras can record videos at up to 4K and 60 frames per second. All cameras have Smart HDR 3, the same HDR technology present in the iPhone 12 series. It includes the same sensors as their predecessors: Face ID, lidar, three-axis gyroscope, accelerometer, barometer, and an ambient light sensor.

=== Accessories ===
In addition to the second generation Apple Pencil, the Smart Keyboard Folio, and the Magic Keyboard, the fifth-generation iPad Pro supports third-party external accessories such as game controllers (Sony's PlayStation and Microsoft's Xbox controllers).

Apple's fifth-generation iPad Pro can also be used with many other peripherals that transform it into a versatile computer, such as a wide range of USB-C accessories, including USB-C hubs and USB-C docks.

== Reception ==
The fifth generation iPad Pro received mixed responses from critics. Some reviewers said that its overboosted processor was limited by iPadOS and the lack of professional macOS applications, while others criticized the placement of its camera system. The Verge criticized the lack of multiuser support like the Mac but praised its Mini-LED screen and cameras.

== See also ==
- Pen computing
- Graphics tablet
- Apple M1
