= IPad Pro (6th generation) =

2022 Apple tablet computer

iPad Pro (M2)

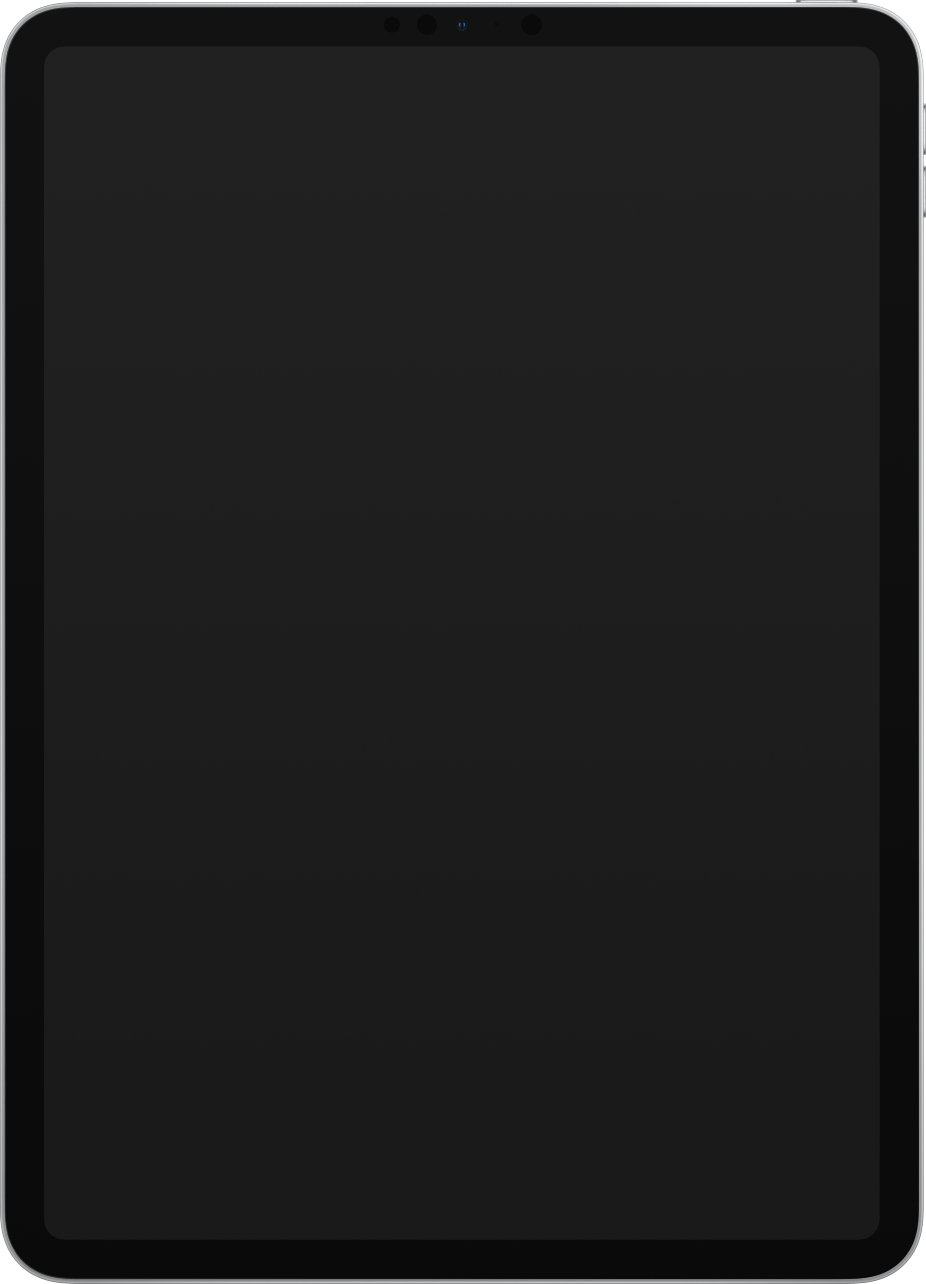
- Also known as: iPad Pro (6th generation) iPad Pro 6 iPad Pro 11-inch (4th generation) iPad Pro 12.9-inch (6th generation)
- Developer: Apple Inc.
- Manufacturer: Foxconn (on contract)
- Product family: iPad Pro
- Type: Tablet computer
- Generation: 6th
- Released: October 26, 2022; 4 years ago
- Introductory price: 11 in (280 mm): $799; 12.9 in (330 mm): $1099
- Discontinued: May 7, 2024; 2 years ago
- Operating system: Original: iPadOS 16.1; Current: iPadOS 27.2, released October 26, 2026
- System on a chip: Apple M2
- Memory: 8 GB, 16 GB RAM
- Storage: 128 GB, 256 GB, 512 GB, 1 TB, 2 TB
- Display: 11-inch (280 mm) (2,388 × 1,668) px (264 ppi), 600-nits Max Brightness, Wide-Color Display (P3), True Tone Display, and Fully Laminated Display; 12.9-inch (330 mm) (2,732 × 2,048) px (264 ppi), 600-nits Max Brightness, Wide-Color Display (P3), True Tone Display, and Fully Laminated Display, and XDR brightness: 1000 nits max full screen, 1600 nits peak
- Sound: 4 speaker audio
- Connectivity: Wi-Fi 6E with 2x2 MIMO and Simultaneous dual band, Bluetooth 5.3; Wi-Fi + Cellular models 5G (sub‑6 GHz) with 4x4 MIMO, Gigabit LTE with 4x4 MIMO and LAA
- Dimensions: 12.9-inch: 280.6 mm (11.05 in) (h); 214.9 mm (8.46 in) (w); 6.4 mm (0.25 in) (d); 11-inch: 247.6 mm (9.75 in) (h); 178.5 mm (7.03 in) (w); 5.9 mm (0.23 in) (d)
- Weight: 11" Wi-Fi: 1.03 pounds (466 grams); 11" Wi-Fi + Cellular: 1.04 pounds (470 grams); 12.9" Wi-Fi: 1.5 pounds (682 grams); 12.9" Wi-Fi + Cellular: 1.51 pounds (685 grams)
- Predecessor: iPad Pro (M1)
- Successor: iPad Pro (M4)
- Website: www.apple.com/ipad-pro/

The sixth-generation iPad Pro (Note: Officially referred to by Apple as the iPad Pro 11-inch (280 mm) (4th generation) and the iPad Pro 11-inch (280 mm) (6th generation)) is a line of tablet computers developed and marketed by Apple as part of their iPad brand. It was announced on October 18, 2022, and was released on October 26, 2022. It is available with the same screen size options as its predecessor: 11-inch (280 mm) and 12.9-inch (330 mm).

Upgrades over the previous generation include the Apple M2 processor, the Apple Pencil hover, which shows where the Apple Pencil will touch down on the display, support for Wi-Fi 6E, Bluetooth 5.3, and Smart HDR 4.

== Features ==
=== Hardware ===
The sixth-generation iPad Pro uses an Apple M2 SoC. It features an eight-core CPU with four performance cores and four efficiency cores, a 10-core GPU, and a 16-core Neural Engine. Internal storage options include 128 GB, 256 GB, 512 GB, 1 TB and 2 TB. The 128, 256, and 512 GB versions include 8 GB of RAM, while the 1 and 2 TB versions include 16 GB of RAM.

The 11-inch (280 mm) model has a Liquid Retina display with a peak brightness of 600 nits, which is the same as the 11-inch (280 mm) model of the 3rd, 4th, and 5th generation iPad Pro 11-inch (280 mm). The 12.9-inch (330 mm) model boasts a mini LED HDR display called the Liquid Retina XDR display built in with a 1,000,000:1 contrast ratio, a brightness of 1000 nits and a peak brightness of 1600 nits (HDR), which is the same as the 12.9-inch (330 mm) model of the 5th generation. Both models support True Tone, ProMotion, 120 Hz variable refresh rate, and P3 wide color gamut.

The iPad Pro uses 100% recycled aluminum and sources at least 99% of its rare earth elements from recycled sources. It is free of mercury, arsenic, brominated fire retardants, PVC, and beryllium.

=== Accessories ===
The sixth-generation iPad Pro supports the second-generation Apple Pencil, the Magic Keyboard, the Magic Trackpad, the Magic Mouse, Smart Keyboard Folio, and USB-C accessories.

The position and angle of Pencil can now be detected up to 12 millimetres (0.47 in) above the screen. Apple refers to this new ability as "Pencil hover", which can be used by apps for features such as previewing brush and pen strokes, and with existing hover interactions intended for mouse / touchpad input.

== Reception ==
The sixth-generation iPad Pro received mixed responses from critics. Some reviewers criticized that the front-facing camera is in a less desirable landscape position than the 10th-generation iPad’s is. Some reviewers praised the Apple Pencil hover, fast performance, battery life, and the display.

== Timeline ==
Timeline of iPad models
See also: List of Apple products

Source: Apple Newsroom Archive.
