= IPad Pro (M4) =

Tablet computer developed by Apple in 2024

iPad Pro (M4)

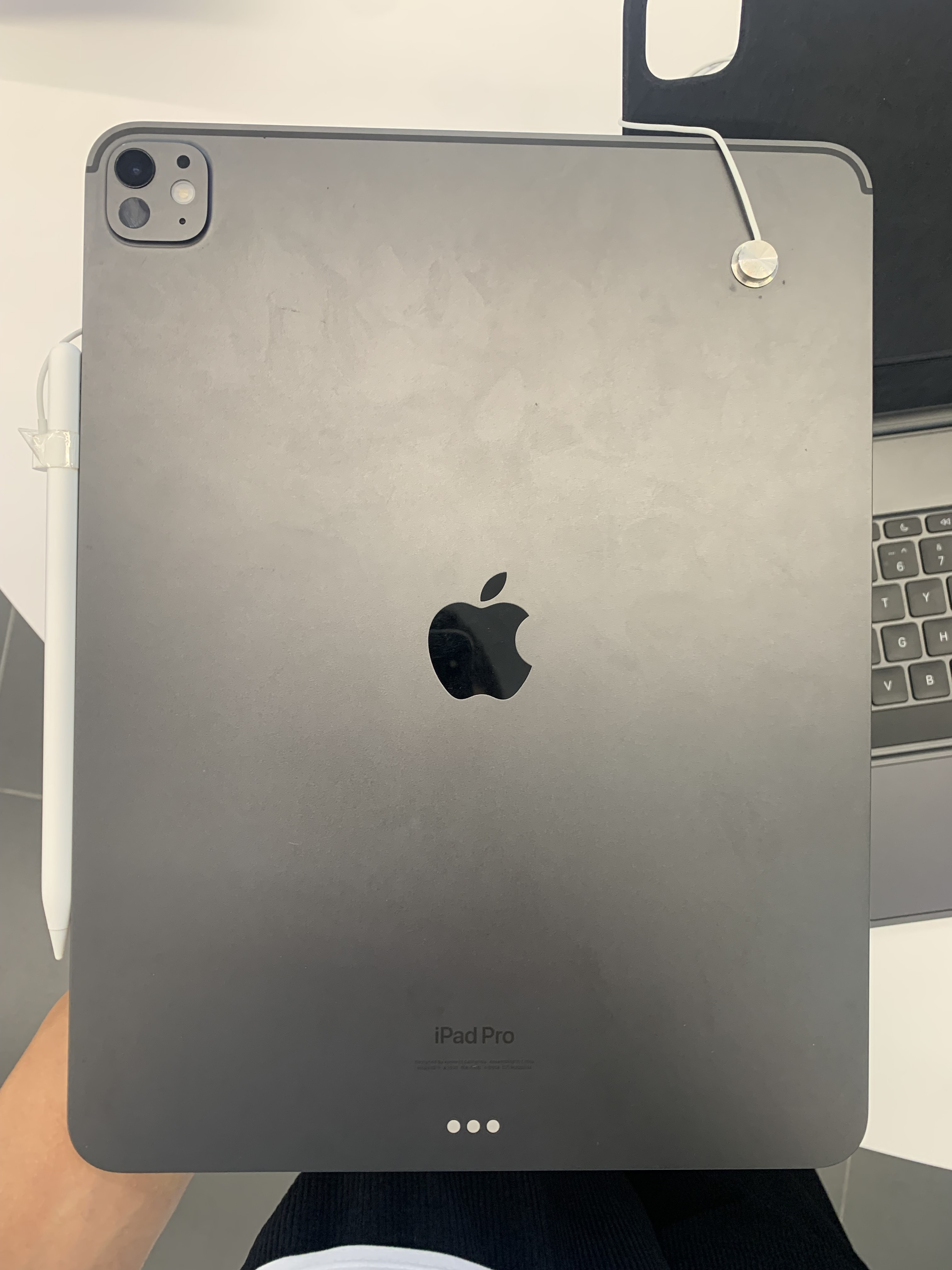
- 13 in (330 mm) iPad Pro M4 backside in Space Black
- Also known as: iPad Pro 7, iPad Pro 11” (5th generation) and iPad Pro 13” (7th generation)
- Developer: Apple Inc.
- Manufacturer: Foxconn (on contract)
- Product family: iPad Pro
- Type: Tablet computer
- Generation: 7th
- Released: May 15, 2024; 2 years ago
- Discontinued: October 15, 2025; 12 months ago
- Operating system: Original: iPadOS 17.4; Current: iPadOS 27.2, released October 26, 2026
- System on a chip: Apple M4
- CPU: 9 cores: 3 high performance; 6 high efficiency; 10 cores: 4 high performance; 6 high efficiency
- Memory: 8 GB LPDDR5X-7500; 16 GB LPDDR5X-7500
- Storage: 256 GB; 512 GB; 1 TB; 2 TB
- Graphics: 10 core 7th generation Apple-designed GPU
- Camera: 12 MP wide and 12 MP landscape front-facing ultrawide
- Connectivity: Wi-Fi 6E with 2x2 MIMO and Simultaneous dual band, Bluetooth 5.3; Wi-Fi + Cellular models 5G (sub‑6 GHz) with 4x4 MIMO, Gigabit LTE with 4x4 MIMO and LAA
- Power: 11 in (280 mm): Built-in 31.29-watt-hour rechargeable lithium-polymer battery 13 in (330 mm): Built-in 38.99-watt-hour rechargeable lithium-polymer battery
- Dimensions: 13-inch: 281.6 mm (11.09 in) (h); 215.5 mm (8.48 in) (w); 5.1 mm (0.20 in) (d); 11-inch: 249.7 mm (9.83 in) (h); 177.5 mm (6.99 in) (w); 5.3 mm (0.21 in) (d)
- Weight: 13-inch Wi-Fi: 579 g (1.28 pounds); 13-inch Wi-Fi + Cellular: 582 g (1.28 pounds); 11-inch Wi-Fi: 444 g (0.98 pounds); 11-inch Wi-Fi + Cellular: 446 g (0.98 pounds)
- Predecessor: iPad Pro (6th generation)
- Successor: iPad Pro (M5)
- Related: iPad Air (M2)
- Website: www.apple.com/ipad-pro/

The seventh-generation iPad Pro (Note: Officially referred to by Apple as the iPad Pro 11-inch (M4) and the iPad Pro 13-inch (M4)) (marketed as the iPad Pro (M4)) is a line of tablet computers developed and marketed by Apple as part of their iPad brand. It was announced on May 7, 2024, during Apple's "Let Loose" event.

The seventh-generation iPad Pro was released on May 15, 2024, and is Apple's first device to use the M4 SoC, as well as the first iPad to use an OLED-based display module. The 13-inch version is Apple's thinnest device, with both models surpassing the seventh-generation iPod Nano.

== Features ==
=== Hardware ===
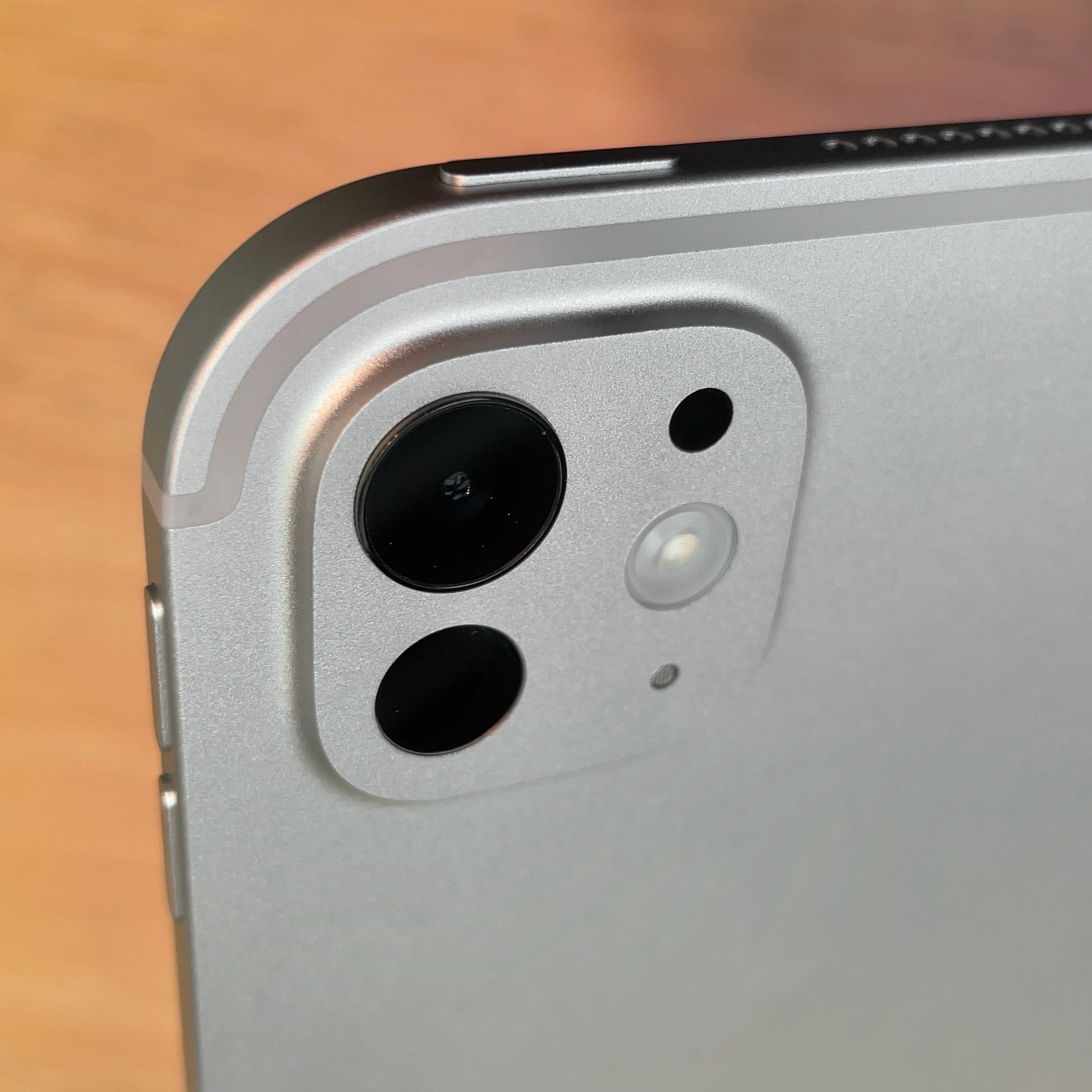
Back Camera Module of the M4 iPad Pro

The seventh-generation iPad Pro models feature the Apple M4 SoC. iPad Pro colors are available in Silver and a new Space Black, which is a darker version of Space Grey, similar to the M3 MacBook Pro. The device comes with a Tandem OLED display for both the 11 in (280 mm) and the 13 in (330 mm) model. The iPad Pro base model has 256 GB of storage, available, additional storage capacities of 512 GB, 1 TB and 2 TB are available. Both models have full screen brightness of 1000 nits for SDR content (with 1600 nits for HDR content). The iPad Pro offers 8 GB of RAM for the 256 and 512 GB and comes with a (binned) 9 core CPU with 3 performance cores and 6 efficiency cores and a 10 core GPU. For the iPad Pro with 1 and 2 TB, the device comes with a 10 core CPU with 4 performance cores and 6 efficiency cores along with 16 GB RAM.

The iPad Pro 1 and 2-terabyte configurations also provide users with the option to add a nano-texture display, and to view the screen in ambient light conditions reducing glare. Unlike previous iPad Pros which comes with a 12 MP and a 10 MP ultrawide camera, this iPad Pro only comes with a 12 MP camera, LiDAR and an upgraded True Tone flash. The tablet also comes with a landscape front facing camera. The M4 SoC has options of a 9 and 10 core CPU.

=== Connectivity ===
The seventh generation iPad Pro includes a USB-C port for charging and connecting accessories. It supports Thunderbolt 3 and USB 40 Gbit/s (USB4) with support for charging, and transfer speeds up to 40 Gbit/s. The iPad Pros support the Apple Pencil Pro, the Apple Pencil USB-C and a new Apple Magic Keyboard featuring a new keyboard layout. The device also comes with WiFi 6E (802.11ax) and Bluetooth 5.3 connectivity on all models, with cellular models adding sub-6 GHz 5G support.

== "Crush!" advertisement controversy ==
The initial announcement advertisement for the iPad Pro, titled "Crush!", received criticism for portraying various artistic instruments and books being destroyed by a hydraulic press and being symbolically compressed into an iPad Pro. The advertisement was originally posted to CEO Tim Cook's X account and the company's YouTube channel.

In a statement to Ad Age on May 9, 2024, an apology was issued by Tor Myhren, Apple’s VP of marketing communications, stating "Creativity is in our DNA at Apple, and it’s incredibly important to us to design products that empower creatives all over the world. Our goal is to always celebrate the myriad of ways users express themselves and bring their ideas to life through iPad. We missed the mark with this video, and we’re sorry." In response to the controversy, Samsung released an ad for their Galaxy Tab S9 titled "UnCrush". Utilizing the same setting, it features a woman playing a damaged guitar from the rubble while using a Tab S9 Ultra as a music sheet, before ending with the tagline "Creativity cannot be crushed."

== Timeline ==
Timeline of iPad models
See also: List of Apple products

Source: Apple Newsroom Archive.
