= Apple M4 =

System-on-a-chip designed by Apple Inc.

Apple M4 series
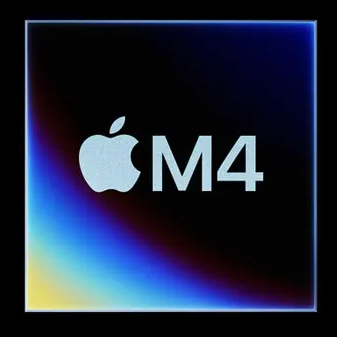

General information
- Launched: M4: May 15, 2024; 2 years ago; Pro and Max: November 8, 2024; 2 years ago
- Designed by: Apple
- Common manufacturer: TSMC

Physical specifications
- Transistors: M4: 28 billion
- Cores: M4: 8, 9 or 10 (3 or 4 P + 4, 5 or 6 E); Pro: 12 or 14 (8 or 10 P + 4 E); Max: 14 or 16 (10 or 12 P + 4 E)
- Memory (RAM): M4: 8, 12, 16, 24, or 32 GB (LPDDR5X, 7500 MT/s); Pro: 24, 48 or 64 GB; Max: 36, 48, 64 or 128 GB; (LPDDR5X, 8533 MT/s)
- GPUs: M4: 8, 9 or 10 cores; Pro: 16 or 20 cores; Max: 32 or 40 cores
- Co-processor: NPU: 38 TOPS (16 cores)

Architecture and classification
- Application: Tablet (iPad Pro and iPad Air); All-in-one (iMac); Desktop (Mac Mini and Mac Studio); Laptop (MacBook Pro and MacBook Air)
- Technology node: 3 nm (N3E)
- Microarchitecture: Donan/BravaChop/Brava
- Instruction set: ARMv9.2-A

History
- Predecessor: Apple M3
- Successor: Apple M5

The Apple M4 is a series of ARM-based systems on a chip made by Apple, part of the Apple silicon series, including a central processing unit (CPU), a graphics processing unit (GPU), a neural processing unit (NPU), and a digital signal processor (DSP). The M4 SoC was introduced in May 2024 for the iPad Pro (7th generation), and is the fourth generation of the M series Apple silicon architecture, succeeding the Apple M3.

== Design ==
Apple M series comparison
Chip	CPU cores			GPU cores	RAM options (GB)	Displays	Memory bandwidth (GB/s)	Introduced
Chip	S	P	E	GPU cores	RAM options (GB)	Displays	Memory bandwidth (GB/s)	Introduced
M1	—N/a	4	4	8	8/16	2	68	2020
M2	—N/a	4	4	10	8/16/24	2	102	2022
M3	—N/a	4	4	10	8/16/24	2	102	2023
M4	—N/a	4	6	10	16/24/32	3	120	2024
M5	4	—N/a	6	10	16/24/32	3	153	2025
M6	2	4	6	12	16	3	153	2026
M6	2	4	6	12	24/32	3	170	2026

The M4 series is built upon TSMC's second-generation 3-nanometer process and contains 28 billion transistors.

It is Apple's first SoC to reportedly use the ARMv9 CPU architecture. The M4 is based on ARMv9.2a. It supports the Scalable Matrix Extension (SME) but not the Scalable Vector Extension (SVE). Because of the lack of SVE support, the LLVM compiler officially flags the M4 as supporting ARMv8.7a.

=== CPU ===
The base M4 features an 8, 9 or 10-core design made up of three or four performance cores and four or six efficiency cores (with one performance core disabled on binned models)

The M4 Pro features a 12 or 14-core CPU, with eight or ten performance cores and four efficiency cores. Meanwhile, the M4 Max features a 14 or 16-core CPU, with an optional two more performance cores than the M4 Pro.

=== GPU ===
The base M4 includes an 8, 9 (on iPad Air), or 10-core GPU, with hardware-accelerated ray tracing, dynamic caching, and mesh shading introduced with the M3. The M4 Pro has a 16 or 20-core GPU, while the M4 Max contains a 32 or 40-core GPU.

Apple claims that the ray tracing engine of the M4 family of GPUs is twice as fast as the M3.

=== NPU ===
The M4 Neural Engine has been significantly improved compared to its predecessor, with the advertised capability to perform up to 38 trillion operations per second, claimed to be more than double the advertised performance of the M3. The M4 NPU performs over 60× faster than the A11 Bionic, and is approximately 3× faster than the original M1.

=== Memory ===
The M4 is packaged with LPDDR5X unified memory, supporting 120GB/sec of memory bandwidth. The SoC is offered in 8GB, 12GB, 16GB, 24GB, and 32GB configurations, with the 8GB and 12GB configuration only being available on the iPad.

The M4 Pro is available with up to 64GB unified memory (Mac Mini) with a theoretical maximum bandwidth of 273GB/sec. The M4 Max is capable of addressing up to 128GB unified memory, with over half a terabyte per second (546GB/sec) of memory bandwidth, with a slightly reduced bandwidth (410GB/sec) for the binned 32-core M4 Max.

== Performance ==
Apple claims up to 50% more CPU performance and 4× more GPU performance on the M4 compared to the M2. The M4 competes for the highest-scoring consumer SoC for single-core benchmarks according to various sources such as the Geekbench benchmarking suite and Passmark Software's CPU benchmarks. In doing so, M4's single-core performance competes with AMD's Ryzen 7 9700X and Intel's Core i9-14900K.

Meanwhile, in multithreaded performance, the M4 performs similarly to the M3 Pro and the product line as a whole competes with similar consumer level processors from Intel and AMD, such as the Intel Core Ultra and AMD Ryzen series.

== Additional features ==
A new display controller has also been implemented to support the iPad Pro (7th generation)'s Tandem OLED display.

== Products that use the Apple M4 series ==
=== M4 ===
- iPad Pro (M4)
- iMac (2024)
- Mac Mini (2024)
- MacBook Pro (14-inch, 2024)
- MacBook Air (2025)
- iPad Air (M4)

=== M4 Pro ===
- Mac Mini (2024)
- MacBook Pro (14-inch and 16-inch, 2024)

=== M4 Max ===
- MacBook Pro (14-inch and 16-inch, 2024)
- Mac Studio (2025)

== Variants ==
Apple M4 series configurations
Variant	CPU		GPU			NPU		Memory				Transistor count	TDP	Used in
Variant	P- cores	E- cores	Cores (Note: Each GPU core has 16 execution units (EUs) and 128 arithmetic logic units (ALUs))	EU	ALU	Cores	Performance	RAM (MT/s)	Controllers (Note: Each LPDDR5 memory controller contains a 16-bit memory channel and can access up to 4 GB of memory.)	Bandwidth	Max Capacity	Transistor count	TDP	Used in
A18	2	4	4	64	512	16	38 TOPS	LPDDR5X-7500	4	60 GB/s	8 GB	15.2 billion	8 W	iPhone 16e
A18	2	4	5	80	640	16	38 TOPS	LPDDR5X-7500	4	60 GB/s	8 GB	15.2 billion	8 W	iPhone 16/Plus
A18 Pro	2	4	5	80	640	16	38 TOPS	LPDDR5X-7500	4	60 GB/s	8 GB	18 billion	8 W	MacBook Neo
A18 Pro	2	4	6	96	768	16	38 TOPS	LPDDR5X-7500	4	60 GB/s	8 GB	18 billion	8 W	iPhone 16 Pro/Pro Max
M4	3	5	9	144	1152	16	38 TOPS	LPDDR5X-7500	?	?	12 GB	?	?	iPad Air
M4	3	6	10	160	1280	16	38 TOPS	LPDDR5X-7500	8	120 GB/s	8 GB	28 billion	22 W	iPad Pro (256–512GB)
M4	4	6	10	160	1280	16	38 TOPS	LPDDR5X-7500	8	120 GB/s	32 GB	28 billion	22 W	iPad Pro (1–2TB), 16GB memory iMac (4-port), Mac Mini, MacBook Pro 14", MacBook Air 24 or 32 GB memory
M4	4	6	8	128	1024	16	38 TOPS	LPDDR5X-7500	8	120 GB/s	32 GB	28 billion	22 W	MacBook Air 16GB memory
M4	4	4	8	128	1024	16	38 TOPS	LPDDR5X-7500	8	120 GB/s	24 GB	28 billion	22 W	iMac (2-port)
M4 Pro	8	4	16	256	2048	16	38 TOPS	LPDDR5X-8533	16	273 GB/s	64 GB		38 W	Mac Mini; MacBook Pro 48GB memory
M4 Pro	10	4	20	320	2560	16	38 TOPS	LPDDR5X-8533	16	273 GB/s	64 GB		46 W	Mac Mini; MacBook Pro 48GB memory
M4 Max	10	4	32	512	4096	16	38 TOPS	LPDDR5X-8533	24	410 GB/s	36 GB		62 W	MacBook Pro; Mac Studio
M4 Max	12	4	40	640	5120	16	38 TOPS	LPDDR5X-8533	32	546 GB/s	128 GB		70 W	MacBook Pro; Mac Studio
