= Neural Engine =

AI accelerator series by Apple Inc.

Neural Engine is a series of AI accelerators designed for machine learning by Apple. Neural Engine was first introduced with the A11 Bionic system-on-a-chip (SoC), used in the iPhone 8, iPhone 8 Plus and iPhone X from 2017. In 2020, Apple introduced its M1 processor for its Mac computers which also used a Neural Engine. Every A-series and M-series processor since 2017 has included a Neural Engine.

Apple services such as its Siri virtual assistant, Face ID facial recognition and Apple Intelligence AI services are powered by the Neural Engine, and since this is handled on-device, user data is secure.

== Applications ==
The Neural Engine is used for real-time AI-driven applications such as Face ID, Siri, and augmented reality (AR). It also handles computational photography features, including Smart HDR and Night Mode, by processing large amounts of sensor data for real-time image enhancements.

In 2024, Apple also introduced its Apple Intelligence AI suite to iPhone, iPad and Mac, which included features like improvements to Siri, creating images with 'Image Playground' and proofreading and correcting text with 'Writing Tools'.

== Energy efficiency and privacy ==
The Neural Engine also provides high energy efficiency, allowing real-time AI tasks to be performed with minimal battery consumption. Its on-device processing ensures that sensitive tasks such as facial recognition and voice commands are handled locally, enhancing privacy by keeping user data secure.

== Developer tools ==
The Neural Engine is fully integrated with Apple's Core ML framework, which allows developers to run machine learning models on-device. This integration supports applications like object recognition, natural language processing, and gesture detection.

== Performance ==
Apple has stated the Neural Engine in the M4 can perform 38 trillion operations per second (TOPS), an improvement over the 18 TOPS in the M3.
