= Asahi Linux =

Linux distribution for Apple Silicon-powered Macs

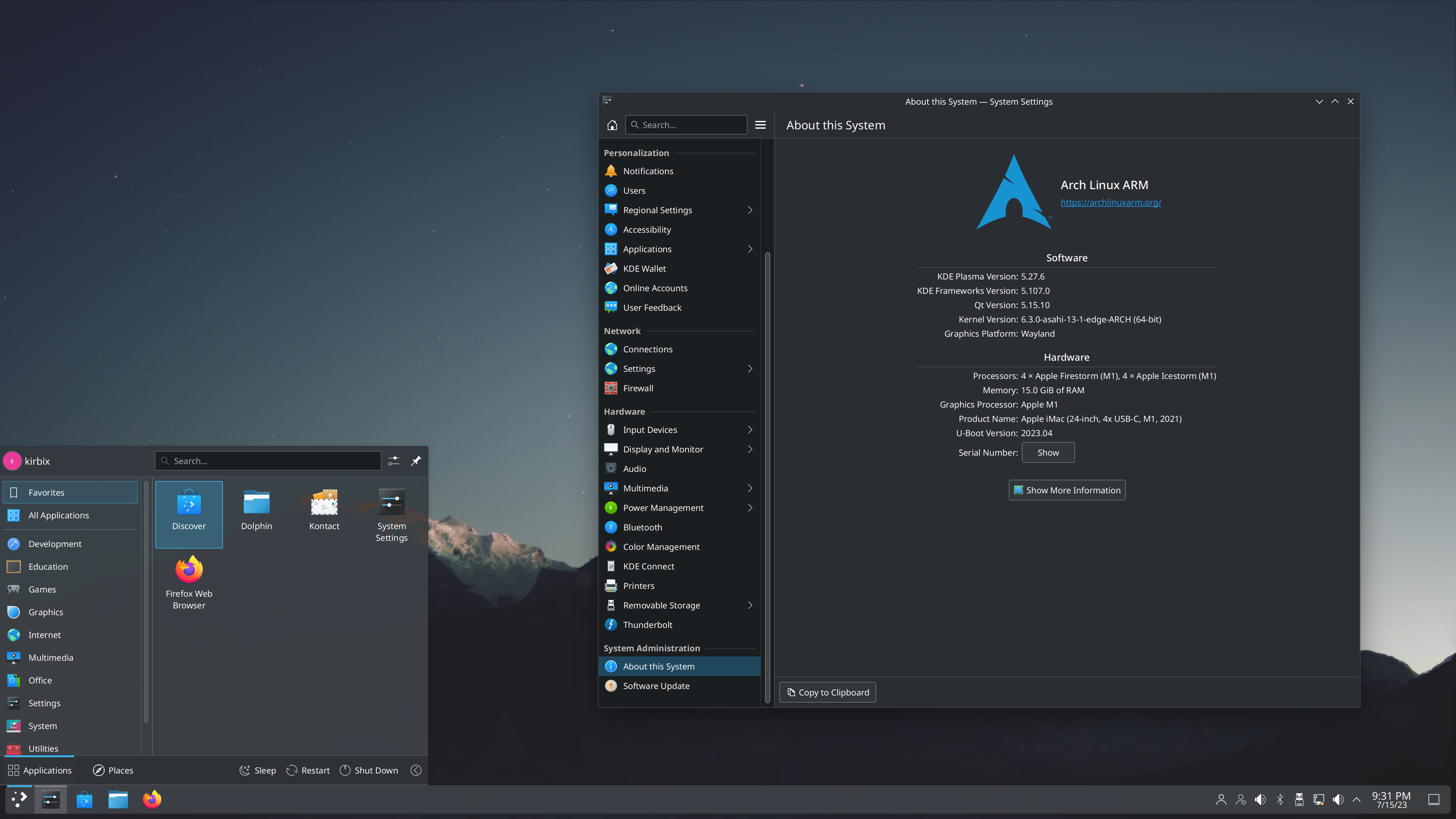
- Screenshot of Arch Linux ARM on Asahi Linux with KDE Plasma 5
- Developer: Hector Martin; Alyssa Rosenzweig; Dougall Johnson; Sven Peter; Mark Kettenis; Martin Povišer; Neal Gompa; Davide Cavalca; Eric Curtin; Janne Grunau
- OS family: Linux (Unix-like)
- Working state: Official Stable (Fedora 45)
- Source model: Open source
- Repository: github.com/AsahiLinux
- Supported platforms: Apple M1/M2/M3 (including Pro, Max and Ultra) (AArch64)
- License: MIT License
- Official website: asahilinux.org

Asahi Linux (Japanese: 朝日, lit. 'rising sun') is a project that ports the Linux kernel and related software to Apple Silicon-powered Macs, started by Hector Martin. It does so by reverse-engineering the SoCs, which lack official, publicly available documentation from Apple.

== History ==
Shortly after Apple announced their transition away from Intel x86 processors in late 2020, Linux creator Linus Torvalds expressed interest in Linux support for the Apple M1 Mac, but thought that the work to make this happen was too time-consuming for him to personally take on the necessary software development tasks.

Martin announced the project in December 2020 and formally started work a month later in 2021, after securing crowd-sourced funding. Alyssa Rosenzweig, who developed the open-source graphics driver stack Panfrost, joined the project to help support the Apple Silicon graphics processing unit (GPU). The project has been made challenging by the lack of publicly available documentation of Apple's proprietary firmware.

The developers quickly realized that attempting to boot the Linux kernel compiled for Apple Silicon's processor architecture (AArch64) would be challenging, as it involved working out the functionality of proprietary Apple code used in the boot process. The work was time-consuming and took most of the year, including submitting pull requests to the main Linux kernel developers to keep development in sync and avoid regressions. However, it subsequently led to a thorough and comprehensive explanation of the previously undocumented boot process, which Martin and others published on GitHub.

The project released an experimental alpha version of the Asahi Linux installer in March 2022. The installer offered the choice of a desktop based on Arch Linux ARM, a minimal environment, or a basic UEFI environment for installing OpenBSD or alternate Linux distributions with support for Apple Silicon via a bootable USB flash drive. In July 2022, the Asahi Linux team released an update with support for the M1 Ultra, Mac Studio, and early initial support for the M2 MacBook Pro.

Despite being able to launch a UEFI shell, booting Microsoft Windows is not supported, and there are no plans to do so, as it would involve modifying the proprietary Windows kernel. Other unrelated projects that are attempting a port of Windows to these systems have acknowledged roadblocks related to the proprietary Apple Interrupt Controller (AIC), and Apple's IOMMU hardware which only supports 16 KiB pages.

In August 2023, it was announced that Asahi was partnering with the Fedora Project to release the Fedora Asahi Remix, which would supersede the original Arch-based distribution as Asahi's flagship OS. The effort began in late 2021, and is an upstream-first project. The end goal of the project is to merge upstream all changes so that the project's distribution becomes unnecessary.

In October 2023, Fedora Asahi Remix was released as a Beta, 3 months later, as a stable version.

In February 2025, Hector Martin, founder and lead developer of Asahi Linux, announced his resignation from leading the project, citing burnout and difficulties with the Linux kernel community. Subsequently, the Asahi Linux team moved to a shared governance model and began accepting funding via Open Collective. In December 2025, Sven Peter gave a talk at the 39th Chaos Communication Congress about the project outlining the current status and showing early M3 and external display output support. In September 2026, support for M3 chips was added.

== Hardware and driver support ==
A Vulkan driver is in a working prototype and OpenGL 4.6 and OpenGL ES 3.2 are supported. This driver is currently the only fully-compliant AGX (Apple Silicon GPU) driver for any widespread graphics standard. While initially using the Panfrost driver implementation, the Asahi Linux Project also made use of Gallium-3D and Rust for Linux based APIs for driver development. OpenCL is supported. KDE Plasma rendering is hardware accelerated, while video decoding is not.

HDMI video output is supported on the Apple Silicon Mac Mini and MacBook Pros with Pro chips, and there is no support for video via Thunderbolt although external displays can be used via DisplayLink docks.

For performance reasons, the operating system's kernel has been configured for and supports only 16 KiB pages. If a program has been designed to expect a different page size, then the program will experience alignment problems when being mapped to memory; however, a binary that targets different page sizes can be run within a micro-virtual machine. The page size set by Linux is a global configuration (there is no support for multiple page sizes in operation). The Apple GPU driver supports 4 KiB and 16 KiB pages.

== Reception ==
The project has been well received. A 2022 review in The Register said that it ran surprisingly well for alpha software that is still in development. Similarly, a 2022 review in Ars Technica was impressed by the amount of hardware that was already supported early in the project lifecycle.

== See also ==
- Linux on Apple devices
- Reverse engineering
- Apple Silicon
