= MacBook Pro (Apple silicon) =

Current line of high-end notebook computers by Apple

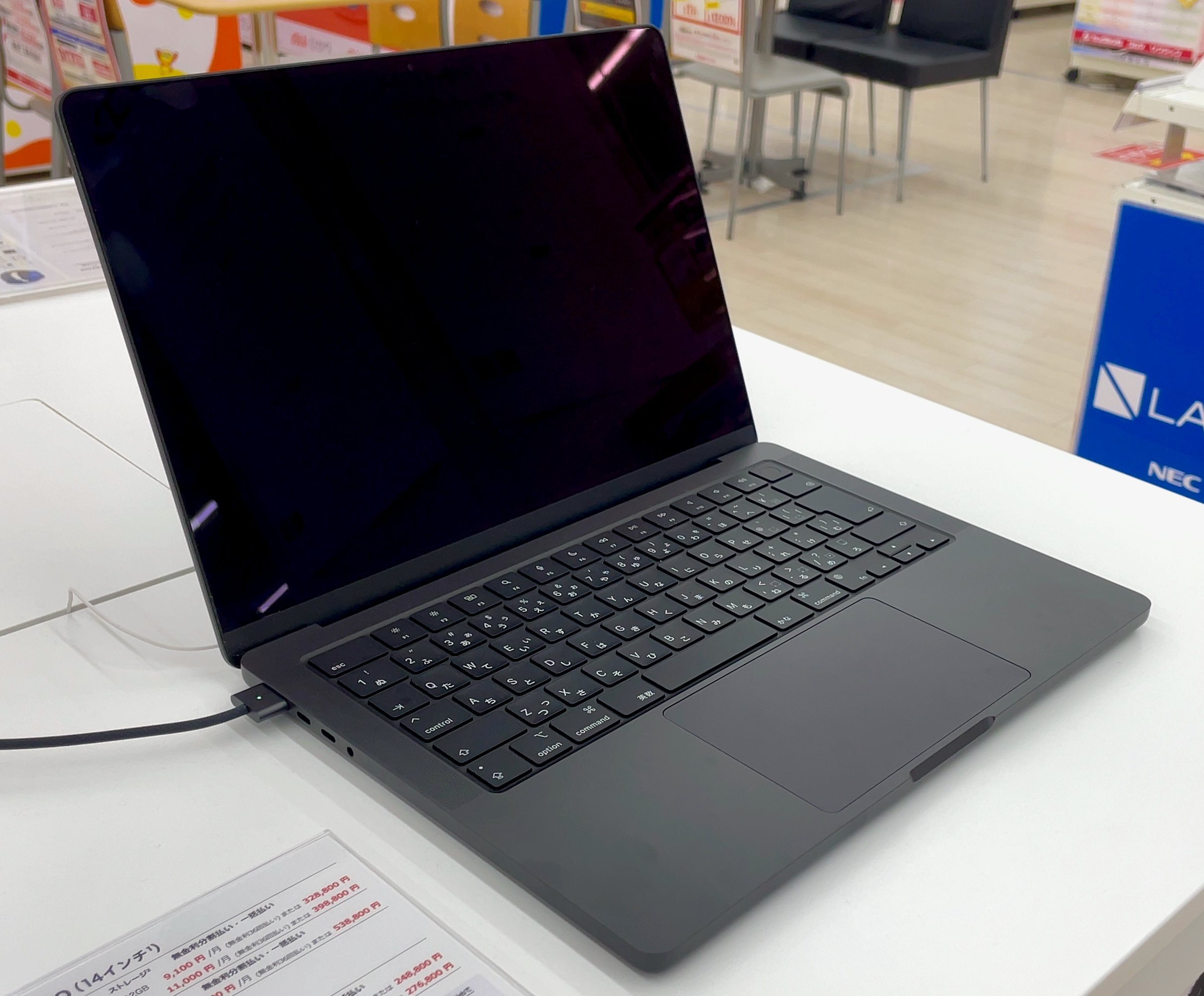
- MacBook Pro (14-inch, 2023) in Space Black, on display in Japan
- Developer: Apple
- Manufacturer: Foxconn; Pegatron
- Product family: MacBook
- Type: Laptop
- Released: November 17, 2020; 6 years ago
- Media: USB, full-size SDXC card
- Operating system: macOS
- System on a chip: Apple M series
- Memory: 8–128 GB unified memory (on-package LPDDR4X, LPDDR5, LPDDR5X)
- Storage: Soldered solid-state drive: 256 GB – 16 TB storage
- Removable storage: SD card
- Display: Previous: Retina display (13 inches (330 mm)); Current: Liquid Retina XDR display (14.2-inch (360 mm) and 16.2-inch (410 mm)) or PROLED XDR display (14.2-inch (360 mm) and 16.3-inch (410 mm))
- Graphics: Apple-designed integrated graphics
- Camera: FaceTime 720p or 1080p
- Touchpad: Force touch trackpad
- Connectivity: Wireless: Wi-Fi, Bluetooth; Wired ports: MagSafe charging port, USB-C, Thunderbolt, HDMI
- Power: Up to 99.6 Wh battery and 140 W GaN power adapter
- Online services: Optional on online configurations: Final Cut Pro, Logic Pro
- Marketing target: Professional use
- Backward compatibility: Supports x86 software with Rosetta 2
- Predecessor: MacBook Pro (Intel-based)
- Related: MacBook Air (Apple silicon); iMac (Apple silicon); Mac Mini (Apple silicon); Mac Studio; Mac Pro
- Website: apple.com/macbook-pro

The MacBook Pro with Apple silicon is a line of notebook computers in the Mac series introduced in November 2020 by Apple. It is Apple's professional notebook, sitting above the entry-level MacBook Neo and mid-range MacBook Air. As of 2026, it is sold with 14-and-16-inch (360 and 410 mm) screens. All models use Apple-designed M-series systems on a chip.

The first MacBook Pro with Apple silicon, based on the Apple M1, was released in November 2020.

The 14- and 16-inch MacBook Pro models were released on October 26, 2021. Powered by either M1 Pro or M1 Max chips, the 14-inch MacBook Pro is the first to be available only with an Apple silicon system on a chip. These models re-introduced elements from previous revisions that were removed in the 2016 Touch Bar MacBook Pro, such as MagSafe charging and hardware function keys.

== 13-inch with Touch Bar (2020–2022) ==
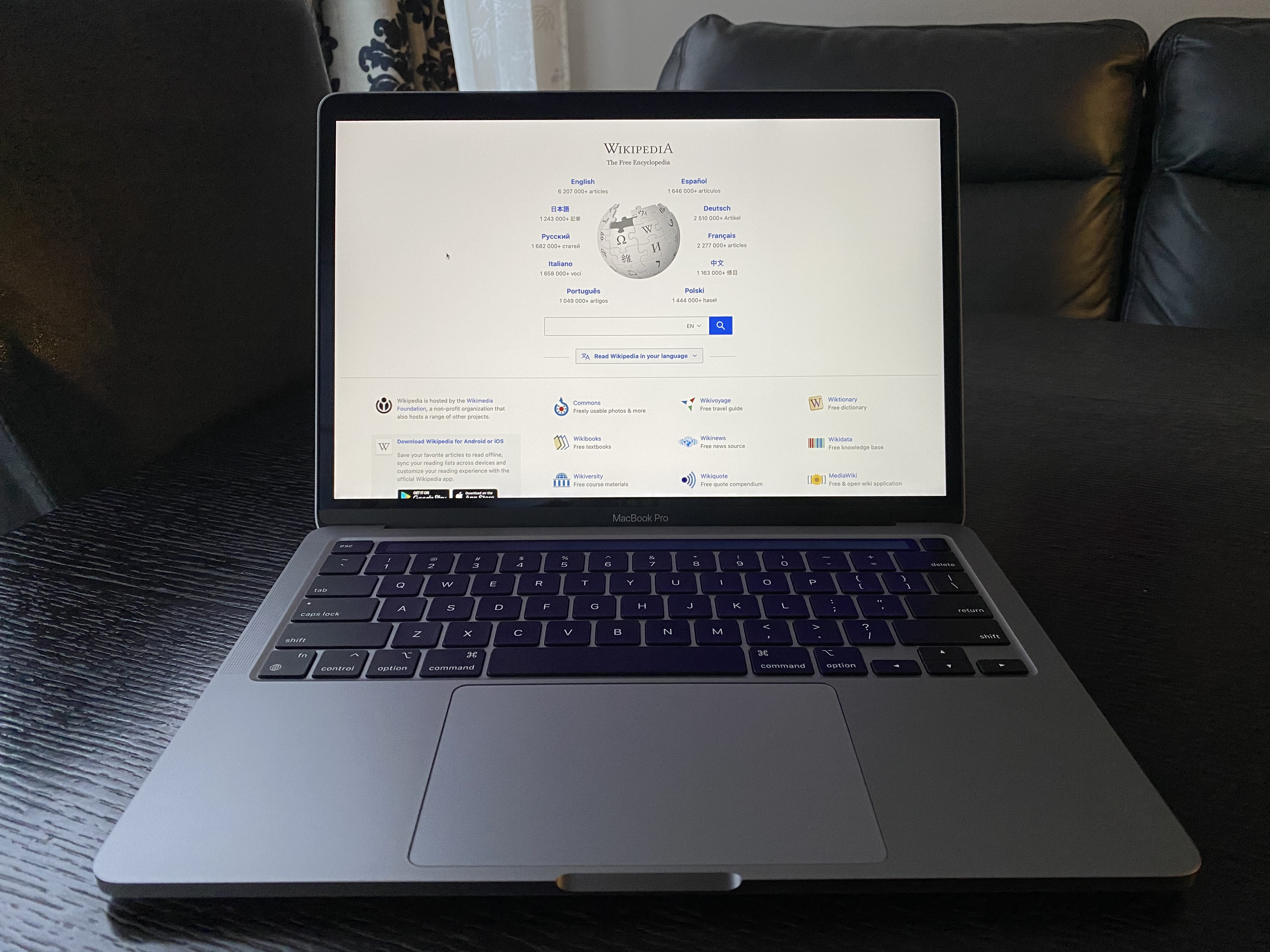
MacBook Pro (13-inch, M1, 2020)

On November 10, 2020, Apple introduced a 13-inch (330 mm) MacBook Pro with two Thunderbolt ports based on the Apple M1 system on a chip, launched alongside an updated MacBook Air and Mac Mini as the first Macs with Apple's new line of custom ARM-based Apple silicon chips. The M1 13-inch MacBook Pro is externally identical to the previous Intel model, with two ports and an aluminum case. It adds support for Wi-Fi 6, USB4, and 6K output to run the Pro Display XDR. The number of supported external displays was reduced to one, while the previous Intel-based models supported two 4K displays. The FaceTime camera remains 720p, but Apple advertises an improved image signal processor (ISP) that came with the M1 for higher quality video.

On June 6, 2022, at WWDC 2022, Apple introduced the 13-inch MacBook Pro with two Thunderbolt ports based on the Apple M2 chip. This launched alongside an updated MacBook Air, with a new design, and also with the M2 chip. The specifications of the M2 MacBook Pro are almost the same, but it supports up to 24 GB of unified memory. The 13-inch Touch Bar MacBook Pro was discontinued on October 30, 2023, in favor of an entry-level 14-inch model with the base M3 chip and two Thunderbolt ports.

=== Reception ===
CNN's review of the M2 MacBook Pro was generally positive, praising it as "one of the fastest laptops ever", but criticized some aspects of the design, noting the lower-priced M2 MacBook Air has a higher-resolution webcam, larger display and MagSafe charging.

==== M2 SSD speed ====
Testing by reviewers found the solid-state drive in the base 256 GB M2 model to be significantly slower (read speeds 50% slower and write speeds 30% slower) than the 256 GB M1 model due to only having one NAND chip as opposed to two. Apple later confirmed to The Verge that the M2 MacBook Air with the same 256 GB storage also lacked a second NAND chip. The subsequent M3 fixed this issue with the base 256 GB M3 model returning using two NANDORAM chips.

=== Technical specifications ===
Discontinued

Model			13-inch, M1, 2020		13-inch, M2, 2022	
Basic info	Hardware strings		MacBookPro17,1		Mac14,7	
Basic info	Model number		A2338			
Basic info	Part number		MYD82, MYDA2	MYD92, MYDC2	MNEH3, MNEP3	MNEJ3, MNEQ3
Basic info	Date	Announced	November 10, 2020		June 6, 2022	
Basic info	Date	Released	November 17, 2020		June 24, 2022	
Basic info	Date	Discontinued	June 6, 2022		October 30, 2023	
Basic info	Date	Unsupported	Supported			
Basic info	Operating system	Initial	macOS Big Sur 11.0		macOS Monterey 12.4	
Basic info	Operating system	Latest	macOS Golden Gate 27.2			
Basic info	Colors					
Basic info	MSRP		US$1,299	US$1,499	US$1,299	US$1,499
Dimensions	Height		0.61 in (15 mm)			
Dimensions	Width		11.97 in (304 mm)			
Dimensions	Depth		8.36 in (212 mm)			
Dimensions	Weight		3.0 lb (1.36 kg)			
Secure authentication	Touch ID		Yes			
Display	Size	Diagonal	13.3 in (340 mm)			
Display	Size	Vertical-by-horizontal	11.28 by 7.05 in (287 by 179 mm)			
Display	Resolution	Vertical-by-horizontal	2560 × 1600			
Display	Resolution	Density	227 ppi			
Display	Resolution	Aspect ratio	16:10			
Display	Resolution	Supported scaled resolutions	1680 × 1050 (rendered as 3360 × 2100); 1440 × 900 (rendered as 2880 × 1800, default); 1280 × 800 (rendered as 2560 × 1600, native); 1024 × 640 (rendered as 2048 × 1280)			
Display	Technology		Retina Display with IPS technology			
Display	Backlight		LED-backlit			
Display	Nano-texture configuration		No			
Display	Refresh rate	Minimum	60 Hz			
Display	Refresh rate	Maximum	60 Hz			
Display	Refresh rate	ProMotion Display	No			
Display	Refresh rate	Supported fixed refresh rate	—N/a			
Display	Brightness and contrast	SDR max brightness	500 nits			
Display	Brightness and contrast	XDR Max brightness	—N/a			
Display	Brightness and contrast	Contrast ratio (typical)	1,400:1			
Display	Color	Full sRGB	Yes			
Display	Color	Wide color (P3)	Yes			
Display	Color	Color depth	8-bit (native) with millions of colors			
Display	Color	True Tone	Yes			
Display	Color	Night Shift	Yes			
Performance	Cooling system	Number of fan(s)	1			
Performance	Cooling system	Maximum RPM	7199			
Performance	Cooling system	Heat spreader	Aluminum heat spreader attached on processor			
Performance	Chip	Chip name	Apple M1		Apple M2	
Performance	Chip	Technology node	5 nm (N5)		5 nm (N5P)	
Performance	Chip	Bit	64-bit			
Performance	Chip	Total CPU cores	8			
Performance	Chip	High-performance cores	4 × 3.20 GHz		4 × 3.49 GHz	
Performance	Chip	Energy-efficiency cores	4 × 2.06 GHz		4 × 2.42 GHz	
Performance	Chip	Online configuration	—N/a			
Performance	Chip	Graphics processor	Apple G13G		Apple G14G	
Performance	Chip	Total GPU cores	8		10	
Performance	Chip	GPU family	Apple GPU Family 7		Apple GPU Family 8	
Performance	Chip	Hardware-accelerated ray tracing	No			
Performance	Chip	Neural Accelerators in GPU	No			
Performance	Chip	Metal support	Metal 4			
Performance	Chip	Online configuration	—N/a			
Performance	Chip	Neural Engine	16-core (11 TOPS FP16)		16-core (15.8 TOPS FP16)	
Performance	Chip	Media engine	Hardware-accelerated H.264, HEVC		Hardware-accelerated H.264, HEVC, ProRes and ProRes RAW	
Performance	Chip	Apple Intelligence	Yes (currently not available in China mainland)			
Performance	Unified memory	Memory type	LPDDR4X-4266 (2133 MHz)		LPDDR5-6400 (3200 MHz)	
Performance	Unified memory	Memory bus width	128-bit			
Performance	Unified memory	Memory bandwidth	68.3 GB/s		102.4 GB/s	
Performance	Unified memory	Memory size	8 GB			
Performance	Unified memory	Online configuration	16 GB		16 GB; 24 GB	
Performance	Storage	Storage type	PCIe 4.0-based SSD			
Performance	Storage	Storage speed	Up to 3.3 GB/s read speed			
Performance	Storage	Storage size	256 GB	512 GB	256 GB	512 GB
Performance	Storage	Online configuration	512 GB; 1 TB; 2 TB	1 TB; 2 TB	512 GB; 1 TB; 2 TB	1 TB; 2 TB
Connector	HDMI		—N/a			
Connector	SDXC card slot		—N/a			
Connector	USB-C/Thunderbolt		Two Thunderbolt 3/USB4 USB-C ports supporting charging and DisplayPort protocols among others			
Connector	Transmission speed		Up to 40 Gbit/s transmission speed (Thunderbolt 3 or USB4)			
Connector	External display support (Note: 5K at 60 Hz is equivalent to 4K at 100 Hz, 6K at 60 Hz is equivalent to 4K at 144 Hz, 8K at 60 Hz is equivalent to 4K at 240 Hz)	Maximum display	1			
Connector	External display support	One external display	1 × 6K at 60 Hz (Thunderbolt)			
Connectivity	Wi-Fi		Wi-Fi 6 (802.11a/b/g/n/ac/ax)			
Connectivity	Bluetooth		Bluetooth 5.0			
Keyboard and trackpad	Type		Backlit Magic Keyboard with scissor-switch mechanism and ambient light sensor			
Keyboard and trackpad	Number of keys		65 (U.S.) or 66 (ISO)			
Keyboard and trackpad	Arrow keys		4 arrow keys in an inverted-T arrangement			
Keyboard and trackpad	Function keys		Esc key is physical only			
Keyboard and trackpad	Touch Bar		Yes			
Keyboard and trackpad	Trackpad		Force Touch trackpad			
Camera	Resolution		720p FaceTime HD			
Camera	Advanced image signal processor with computational video		Yes			
Camera	Center Stage and Desk View		No			
Audio	Speakers		Stereo speakers with high dynamic range			
Audio	Force-canceling woofers		No			
Audio	Wide stereo sound		Yes			
Audio	Dolby Atmos playback		Yes			
Audio	Dolby Atmos with built-in speakers		No			
Audio	Spatial Audio with dynamic head tracking		Yes			
Audio	Microphone		Studio-quality three-mic array with high signal-to-noise ratio and directional beamforming			
Audio	3.5 mm jack		Yes		Yes With advanced support for high-impedance headphones	
Audio	Audio output from HDMI		No			
Power	Battery		11.4 V 58.2 W·h (5152 mA·h) with 1000 battery cycle count			
Power	Power adapter		61 W USB-C		67 W USB-C	
Power	Optional configuration		—N/a			
Power	Charging method		USB-C ports			
Power	Fast charge capability		—N/a			

== 14-inch and 16-inch with Liquid Retina XDR display (2021–present) ==
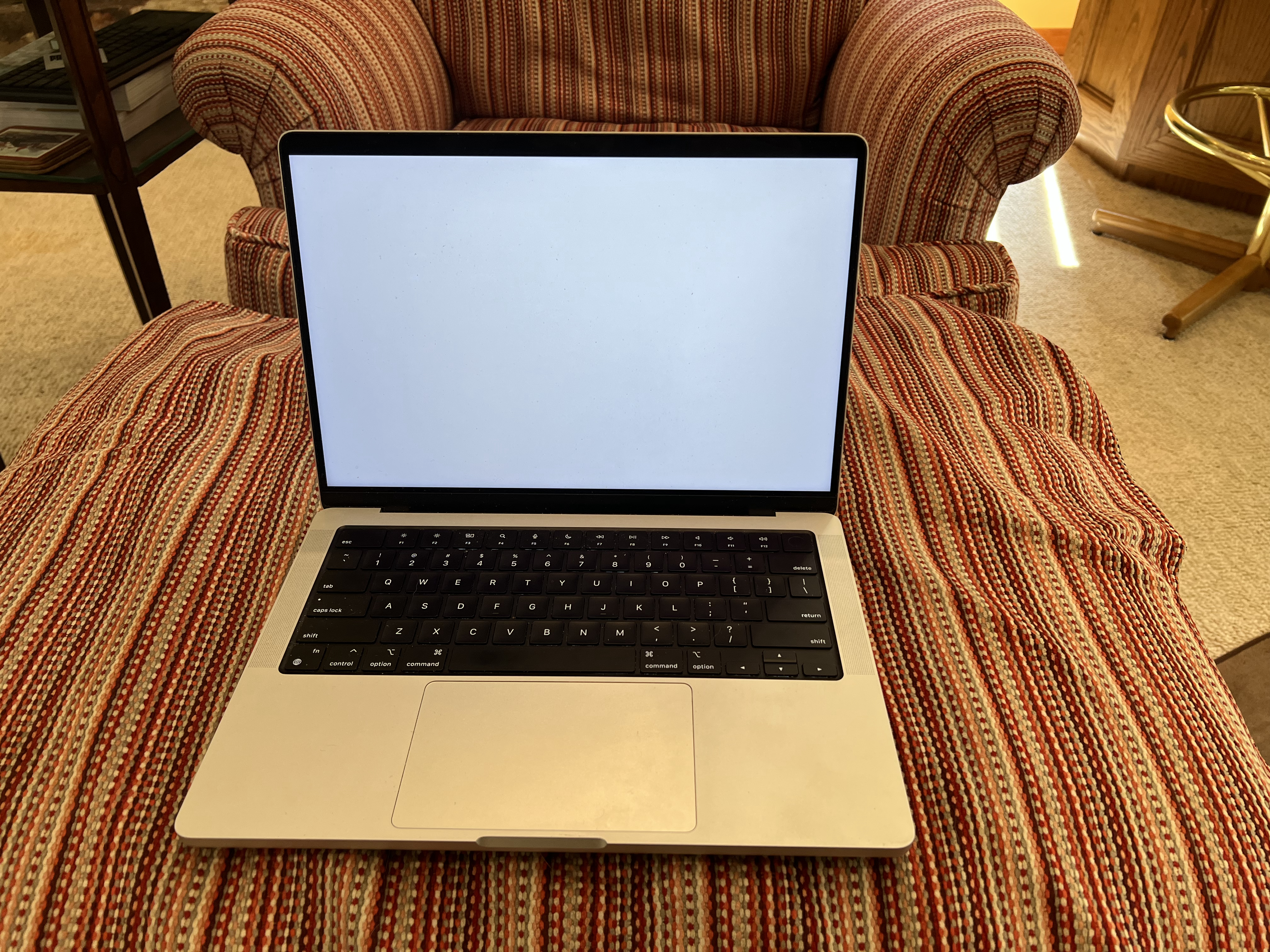
MacBook Pro (14-inch, 2021)

Apple announced redesigned 14-and-16-inch (360 and 410 mm) MacBook Pro models on October 18, 2021, at an Apple online event with the tagline "Unleashed". They are based on the M1 Pro and M1 Max, Apple's first professional-focused ARM-based systems on a chip. The new models addressed many criticisms of the Touch Bar MacBook Pro by re-introducing hard function keys in place of the Touch Bar, an HDMI 2.0 port, a full-size SDXC reader and MagSafe 3 charging. Other additions include a 1000 nit Mini LED Liquid Retina XDR display with ProMotion supporting variable refresh rates up to 120 Hz, thinner display bezels and a 1080p FaceTime webcam housed in an iPhone-like notch, Wi-Fi 6, Thunderbolt 4, and a six-speaker sound system supporting Dolby Atmos. The M1 Pro chip supports up to two external displays, both at 6K resolution, while the M1 Max chip supports up to four displays: three at 6K resolution, and one at 4K resolution. The 16-inch version is bundled with a 140 W GaN power supply that supports USB-C Power Delivery 3.1, though only MagSafe supports full-speed charging as the machine's USB-C ports are limited to 100 W.

On January 17, 2023, Apple announced updated 14-inch and 16-inch models based on the M2 Pro and M2 Max chips. The updated models also include Bluetooth 5.3 and Wi-Fi 6E connectivity, HDMI 2.1, longer battery life, and up to 96 GB of memory with M2 Max models with better speed and performance.

On October 30, 2023, Apple announced updated 14-inch and 16-inch models with M3, M3 Pro and M3 Max chips, increased memory, and screens that support 600 nits of SDR brightness. The M3 Pro and M3 Max models replace the space gray finish with a darker space black finish. A lower-end 14-inch model was introduced with an M3 chip and two USB4/Thunderbolt 3 ports, replacing the 13-inch M2 MacBook Pro. The models also include a Thread radio unannounced by Apple. 16-inch models support charging at 140 W over USB-C.

On October 30, 2024, Apple announced updated models with M4, M4 Pro and M4 Max chips, 12 MP webcams with support for Center Stage, brighter 1,000 nit displays with a nano-texture option, and Thunderbolt 5 connectivity with a third port added to the M4 14-inch model. The baseline 14-inch models come with 16 GB RAM as standard, whereas the previous M3 14-inch model previously started with 8 GB.

On October 15, 2025, Apple announced updated 14-inch models with the Apple M5 chip. On March 3, 2026, Apple announced the updated 14-inch and 16-inch models with the M5 Pro and M5 Max chips, increased memory and storage, and the Apple N1 networking chip with Wi-Fi 7 and Bluetooth 6.

On October 27, 2026, Apple announced the 14-inch MacBook Pro with the Apple M6 chip, the dual 16-core Neural Engine, and the N1 chip with Wi-Fi 7 and Bluetooth 6. It adds support for up to two external displays at 4K resolution at 165 Hz, up from 144 Hz.

=== Design ===
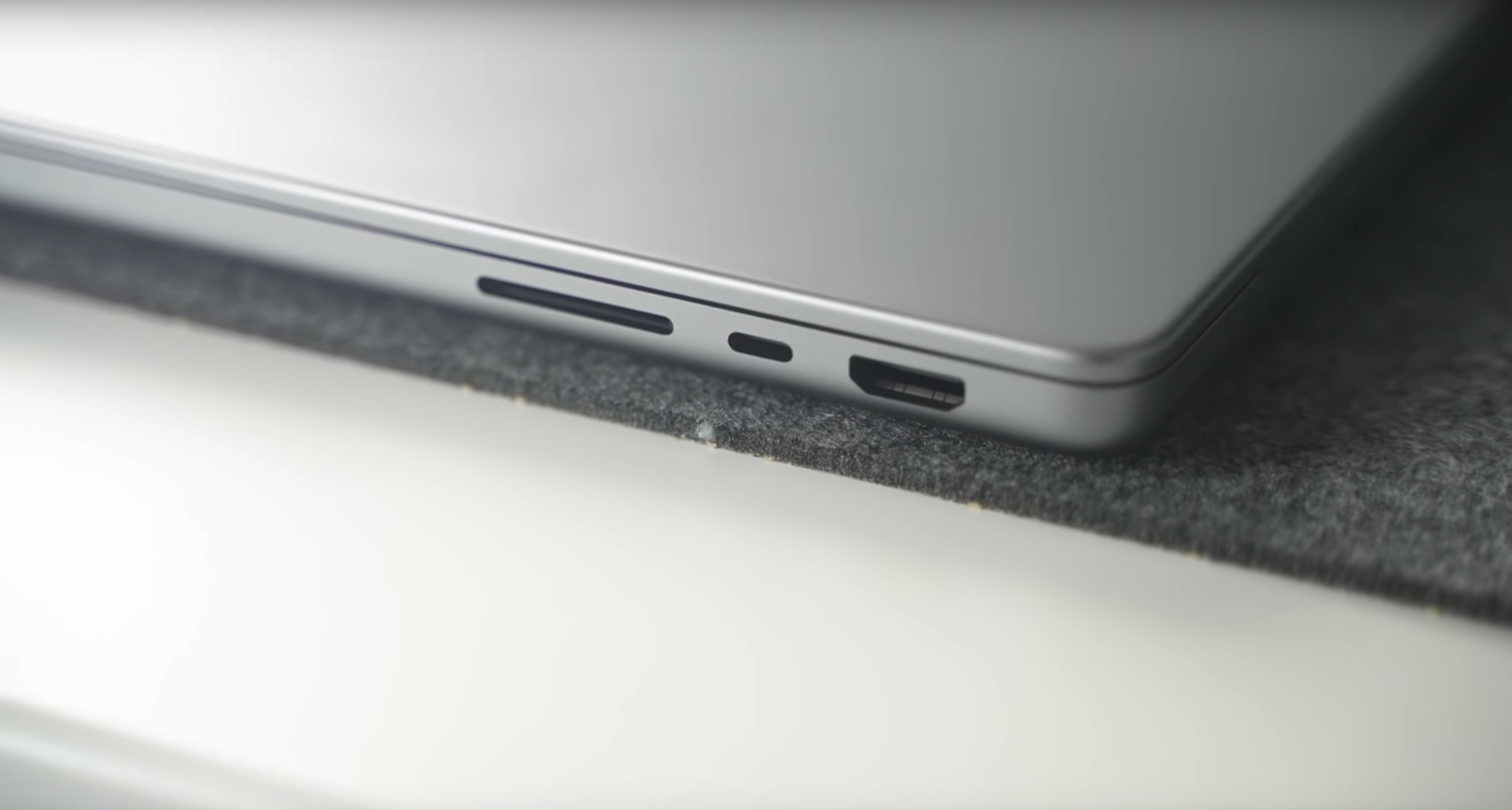
SD card slot and HDMI port on the MacBook Pro (2021)

The 14-inch and 16-inch MacBook Pro models feature a thicker and more-squared design than their immediate Intel-based predecessors. The keyboard features full-sized function keys, with the keyboard set in a "double anodized" black well. The MacBook Pro branding has been removed from the bottom of the display bezel and is engraved on the underside of the chassis instead. The models' appearance has been called reminiscent of the Titanium PowerBook G4 produced from 2001 to 2003. The models are available in silver or space gray finishes, similar to the previous Intel models. There was some criticism on social media that the MagSafe cable only came in silver and mismatched the space gray models.

=== Reception ===
Reception to the 2021 MacBook Pro was generally positive. Online reviewers such Justine Ezarik (iJustine), Emily Young of Linus Tech Tips and Marques Brownlee praised the new design, the larger function keys, the new screen and M1 Pro and M1 Max. The Verge gave the models a 9.5/10 score, praising the increased speed and battery life, improved displays and speakers, and the removal of the Touch Bar, but criticized memory upgrade costs as "absurd" and noted only Apple's own apps seemed optimized for the GPUs.

iFixit gave the models a repairability score of 4/10, compared to just 1/10 for the Touch Bar MacBook Pro, saying that battery replacements are easier as it is no longer glued in, and the display as well as most ports are modular, though noted speakers are glued in and solid-state storage is permanently soldered (as before).

Under realistic workloads, the 8 GB RAM model suffers from bottleneck issues compared to the 16 GB RAM model. In 2024, with the release of the M4 chip, Apple increased the base memory to 16 GB across all Mac models.

=== Technical specifications ===
Discontinued	Current

==== M1 Pro and M1 Max models ====
Model			14-inch (360 mm), 2021					16-inch (410 mm), 2021			
Basic info	Hardware strings		MacBookPro18,3			MacBookPro18,4		MacBookPro18,1		MacBookPro18,2	
Basic info	Model number		A2442					A2485			
Basic info	Part number		MKGP3, MKGR3	Build-to-order	MKGQ3, MKGR3	Build-to-order		MK183, MK1E3	MK193, MK1F3	Build-to-order	MK1A3, MK1H3
Basic info	Date	Announced	October 18, 2021								
Basic info	Date	Released	October 26, 2021								
Basic info	Date	Discontinued	January 17, 2023								
Basic info	Date	Unsupported	Supported								
Basic info	Operating system	Initial	macOS Monterey 12.0								
Basic info	Operating system	Latest	macOS Golden Gate 27.2								
Basic info	Colors										
Basic info	MSRP		US$1,999	?	US$2,299	US$2,899	US$3,099	US$2,499	US$2,899	US$3,099	US$3,499
Dimensions	Height		0.61 in (15 mm)					0.66 in (17 mm)			
Dimensions	Width		12.31 in (313 mm)					14.01 in (356 mm)			
Dimensions	Depth		8.71 in (221 mm)					9.77 in (248 mm)			
Dimensions	Weight		3.5 lb (1.59 kg)					4.7 lb (2.13 kg)			
Secure authentication	Touch ID		Yes								
Display	Size	Diagonal	14.2 in (360 mm)					16.2 in (410 mm)			
Display	Size	Vertical-by-horizontal	11.91 by 7.73 in (303 by 196 mm)					13.61 by 8.79 in (346 by 223 mm)			
Display	Resolution	Vertical-by-horizontal	3024 × 1964					3456 × 2234			
Display	Resolution	Density	254 ppi								
Display	Resolution	Aspect ratio	9:5.85; 16:10 without notch					9:5.82; 16:10 without notch			
Display	Resolution	Supported scaled resolutions	1800 × 1169 (rendered as 3600 × 2338); 1512 × 982 (rendered as 3024 × 1964, default and native); 1352 × 878 (rendered as 2704 × 1756); 1147 × 745 (rendered as 2294 × 1490); 1024 × 665 (rendered as 2048 × 1330)					2056 × 1329 (rendered as 4112 × 2658); 1728 × 1117 (rendered as 3456 × 2234, default and native); 1496 × 967 (rendered as 2992 × 1934); 1312 × 848 (rendered as 2624 × 1696); 1168 × 755 (rendered as 2336 × 1510)			
Display	Technology		Liquid Retina XDR Display with IPS technology								
Display	Backlight		Mini-LED-backlit with 2010 full-array local dimming zones					Mini-LED-backlit with 2554 full-array local dimming zones			
Display	Nano-texture configuration		No								
Display	Refresh rate	Minimum	24 Hz								
Display	Refresh rate	Maximum	120 Hz								
Display	Refresh rate	ProMotion Display	Yes								
Display	Refresh rate	Supported fixed refresh rate	47.95 Hz, 48 Hz, 50 Hz, 59.95 Hz, 60 Hz								
Display	Brightness and contrast	SDR max brightness	500 nits								
Display	Brightness and contrast	XDR max brightness	1000 nits (sustained full-screen); 1600 nits (HDR content)								
Display	Brightness and contrast	Contrast ratio (typical)	1,000,000:1								
Display	Color	Full sRGB	Yes								
Display	Color	Wide color (P3)	Yes								
Display	Color	Color depth	10-bit (FRC) with 1 billion colors								
Display	Color	True Tone	Yes								
Display	Color	Night Shift	Yes								
Performance	Cooling system	Number of fan(s)	2								
Performance	Cooling system	Maximum RPM	5779 RPM (left); 6241 RPM (right)					5348 RPM (left); 5776 RPM (right)			
Performance	Cooling system	Heat spreader	Aluminum heat spreader attached on processor								
Performance	Chip	Chip name	Apple M1 Pro			Apple M1 Max		Apple M1 Pro		Apple M1 Max	
Performance	Chip	Technology node	5 nm (N5)								
Performance	Chip	Bit	64-bit								
Performance	Chip	Total CPU cores	8	10							
Performance	Chip	High-performance cores	6 × 3.23 GHz	8 × 3.23 GHz							
Performance	Chip	Energy-efficiency cores	2 × 2.06 GHz								
Performance	Chip	Online configuration	10-core CPU	—N/a							
Performance	Chip	Graphics processor	Apple G13S			Apple G13C		Apple G13S		Apple G13C	
Performance	Chip	Total GPU cores	14		16	24	32	16		24	32
Performance	Chip	GPU family	Apple GPU Family 7								
Performance	Chip	Hardware-accelerated ray tracing	No								
Performance	Chip	Neural Accelerators in GPU	No								
Performance	Chip	Metal support	Metal 4								
Performance	Chip	Online configuration	16-core GPU (requires 10-core CPU)		—N/a	32-core GPU	—N/a			32-core GPU	—N/a
Performance	Chip	Neural Engine	16-core (11 TOPS FP16)								
Performance	Chip	Media engine	Hardware-accelerated H.264, HEVC, ProRes and ProRes RAW								
Performance	Chip	Apple Intelligence	Yes (currently not available in China mainland)								
Performance	Unified memory	Memory type	LPDDR5-6400 (3200 MHz)								
Performance	Unified memory	Memory bus width	256-bit			512-bit		256-bit		512-bit	
Performance	Unified memory	Memory bandwidth	204.8 GB/s			409.6 GB/s		204.8 GB/s		409.6 GB/s	
Performance	Unified memory	Memory size	16 GB			32 GB		16 GB		32 GB	
Performance	Unified memory	Online configuration	32 GB			64 GB		32 GB		64 GB	
Performance	Storage	Storage type	PCIe 4.0-based SSD								
Performance	Storage	Storage speed	Up to 7.4 GB/s read speed								
Performance	Storage	Storage size	512 GB		1 TB	From 512 GB		512 GB	1 TB		
Performance	Storage	Online configuration	1 TB; 2 TB; 4 TB; 8 TB		2 TB; 4 TB; 8 TB	1 TB (From 512 GB); 2 TB; 4 TB; 8 TB		1 TB; 2 TB; 4 TB; 8 TB	2 TB; 4 TB; 8 TB		
Connector	HDMI		HDMI 2.0								
Connector	SDXC card slot		Yes								
Connector	USB-C/Thunderbolt		Three Thunderbolt 4 USB-C ports supporting charging and DisplayPort protocols among others								
Connector	Transmission speed		Up to 40 Gbit/s transmission speed (Thunderbolt 4 or USB4)								
Connector	External display support	Maximum display	2			4		2		4	
Connector	External display support	One external display	1 × 6K at 60 Hz (Thunderbolt), or; 1 × 4K at 60 Hz (HDMI)								
Connector	External display support	Two external displays	2 × 6K at 60 Hz (Thunderbolt), or; 1 × 6K at 60 Hz (Thunderbolt) + 1 × 4K at 60 Hz (HDMI)								
Connector	External display support	Three external displays	—N/a			3 × 6K at 60 Hz (Thunderbolt), or; 2 × 6K at 60 Hz (Thunderbolt) + 1 × 4K at 60 Hz (HDMI)		—N/a		3 × 6K at 60 Hz (Thunderbolt), or; 2 × 6K at 60 Hz (Thunderbolt) + 1 × 4K at 60 Hz (HDMI)	
Connector	External display support	Four external displays	—N/a			3 × 6K at 60 Hz (Thunderbolt) + 1 × 4K at 60 Hz (HDMI)		—N/a		3 × 6K at 60 Hz (Thunderbolt) + 1 × 4K at 60 Hz (HDMI)	
Connectivity	Wi-Fi		Wi-Fi 6 (802.11a/b/g/n/ac/ax)								
Connectivity	Bluetooth		Bluetooth 5.0; Bluetooth 5.3 (macOS Sonoma and later)								
Keyboard and trackpad	Type		Backlit Magic Keyboard with scissor-switch mechanism and ambient light sensor								
Keyboard and trackpad	Number of keys		78 (U.S.) or 79 (ISO)								
Keyboard and trackpad	Arrow keys		4 arrow keys in an inverted-T arrangement								
Keyboard and trackpad	Function keys		With full-height								
Keyboard and trackpad	Touch Bar		No								
Keyboard and trackpad	Trackpad		Force Touch trackpad								
Camera	Resolution		1080p FaceTime HD								
Camera	Advanced image signal processor with computational video		Yes								
Camera	Center Stage and Desk View		No								
Audio	Speakers		High-fidelity six-speakers								
Audio	Force-canceling woofers		Yes								
Audio	Wide stereo sound		Yes								
Audio	Dolby Atmos playback		Yes								
Audio	Dolby Atmos with built-in speakers		Yes								
Audio	Spatial Audio with dynamic head tracking		Yes								
Audio	Microphone		Studio-quality three-mic array with high signal-to-noise ratio and directional beamforming								
Audio	3.5 mm jack		With advanced support for high-impedance headphones								
Audio	Audio output from HDMI		Yes								
Power	Battery		11.47 V 69.6 W·h (6068 mA·h)					11.45 V 99.6 W·h (8693 mA·h)			
Power	Power adapter		67 W USB-C	96 W USB-C				140 W USB-C GaN			
Power	Optional configuration		96 W USB-C	—N/a							
Power	Charging method		MagSafe 3 or USB-C ports								
Power	Fast charge capability		96 W or 140 W USB-C through MagSafe 3 or USB-C ports					140 W USB-C through MagSafe 3			

==== M2 Pro and M2 Max models ====
Model			14-inch, 2023				16-inch, 2023			
Basic info	Hardware strings		Mac14,9		Mac14,5		Mac14,10		Mac14,6	
Basic info	Model number		A2779				A2780			
Basic info	Part number		MPHE3, MPHH3	MPHF3, MPHJ3	MPHG3, MPHK3	Build-to-order	MNW83, MNWC3	MNW93, MNWD3	Build-to-order	MNWA3, MNWE3
Basic info	Date	Announced	January 17, 2023							
Basic info	Date	Released	January 24, 2023							
Basic info	Date	Discontinued	October 30, 2023							
Basic info	Date	Unsupported	Supported							
Basic info	Operating system	Initial	macOS Ventura 13.0							
Basic info	Operating system	Latest	macOS Golden Gate 27.2							
Basic info	Colors									
Basic info	MSRP		US$1,999	US$2,299	US$2,899	US$3,099	US$2,499	US$2,899	US$3,099	US$3,499
Dimensions	Height		0.61 in (1.5 cm)				0.66 in (1.7 cm)			
Dimensions	Width		12.31 in (31.3 cm)				14.01 in (35.6 cm)			
Dimensions	Depth		8.71 in (22.1 cm)				9.77 in (24.8 cm)			
Dimensions	Weight		3.5 lb (1.59 kg)		3.6 lb (1.63 kg)		4.7 lb (2.13 kg)		4.8 lb (2.18 kg)	
Secure authentication	Touch ID		Yes							
Display	Size	Diagonal	14.2 in (360 mm)				16.2 in (410 mm)			
Display	Size	Vertical-by-horizontal	11.91 by 7.73 in (303 by 196 mm)				13.61 by 8.79 in (346 by 223 mm)			
Display	Resolution	Vertical-by-horizontal	3024 × 1964				3456 × 2234			
Display	Resolution	Density	254 ppi							
Display	Resolution	Aspect ratio	9:5.85; 16:10 without notch				9:5.82; 16:10 without notch			
Display	Resolution	Supported scaled resolutions	1800 × 1169 (rendered as 3600 × 2338); 1512 × 982 (rendered as 3024 × 1964, default and native); 1352 × 878 (rendered as 2704 × 1756); 1147 × 745 (rendered as 2294 × 1490); 1024 × 665 (rendered as 2048 × 1330)				2056 × 1329 (rendered as 4112 × 2658); 1728 × 1117 (rendered as 3456 × 2234, default and native); 1496 × 967 (rendered as 2992 × 1934); 1312 × 848 (rendered as 2624 × 1696); 1168 × 755 (rendered as 2336 × 1510)			
Display	Technology		Liquid Retina XDR Display with IPS technology							
Display	Backlight		Mini-LED-backlit with 2010 full-array local dimming zones				Mini-LED-backlit with 2554 full-array local dimming zones			
Display	Nano-texture configuration		No							
Display	Refresh rate	Minimum	24 Hz							
Display	Refresh rate	Maximum	120 Hz							
Display	Refresh rate	ProMotion Display	Yes							
Display	Refresh rate	Supported fixed refresh rate	47.95 Hz, 48 Hz, 50 Hz, 59.95 Hz, 60 Hz							
Display	Brightness and contrast	SDR max brightness	500 nits							
Display	Brightness and contrast	XDR max brightness	1000 nits (sustained full-screen); 1600 nits (HDR content)							
Display	Brightness and contrast	Contrast ratio (typical)	1,000,000:1							
Display	Color	Full sRGB	Yes							
Display	Color	Wide color (P3)	Yes							
Display	Color	Color depth	10-bit (FRC) with 1 billion colors							
Display	Color	True Tone	Yes							
Display	Color	Night Shift	Yes							
Performance	Cooling system	Number of fan(s)	2							
Performance	Cooling system	Maximum RPM	6800 RPM each				5349 RPM (left); 5777 RPM (right)			
Performance	Cooling system	Heat spreader	Aluminum heat spreader attached on processor							
Performance	Chip	Chip name	Apple M2 Pro		Apple M2 Max		Apple M2 Pro		Apple M2 Max	
Performance	Chip	Technology node	5 nm (N5P)							
Performance	Chip	Bit	64-bit							
Performance	Chip	Total CPU cores	10	12						
Performance	Chip	High-performance cores	6 × 3.49 GHz	8 × 3.49 GHz	8 × 3.68 GHz		8 × 3.49 GHz		8 × 3.68 GHz	
Performance	Chip	Energy-efficiency cores	4 × 2.42 GHz							
Performance	Chip	Online configuration	12-core CPU	—N/a						
Performance	Chip	Graphics processor	Apple G14S		Apple G14C		Apple G14S		Apple G14C	
Performance	Chip	Total GPU cores	16	19	30	38	19		30	38
Performance	Chip	GPU family	Apple GPU Family 8							
Performance	Chip	Hardware-accelerated ray tracing	No							
Performance	Chip	Neural Accelerators in GPU	No							
Performance	Chip	Metal support	Metal 4							
Performance	Chip	Online configuration	19-core GPU (requires 12-core CPU)	—N/a	38-core GPU	—N/a			38-core GPU	—N/a
Performance	Chip	Neural Engine	16-core (15.8 TOPS FP16)							
Performance	Chip	Media engine	Hardware-accelerated H.264, HEVC, ProRes and ProRes RAW							
Performance	Chip	Apple Intelligence	Yes (currently not available in China mainland)							
Performance	Unified memory	Memory type	LPDDR5-6400 (3200 MHz)							
Performance	Unified memory	Memory bus width	256-bit		512-bit		256-bit		512-bit	
Performance	Unified memory	Memory bandwidth	204.8 GB/s		409.6 GB/s		204.8 GB/s		409.6 GB/s	
Performance	Unified memory	Memory size	16 GB		32 GB		16 GB		32 GB	
Performance	Unified memory	Online configuration	32 GB		64 GB	64 GB; 96 GB	32 GB		64 GB	64 GB; 96 GB
Performance	Storage	Storage type	PCIe 4.0-based SSD							
Performance	Storage	Storage speed	Up to 7.4 GB/s read speed							
Performance	Storage	Storage size	512 GB	1 TB			512 GB	1 TB		
Performance	Storage	Online configuration	1 TB; 2 TB; 4 TB; 8 TB	2 TB; 4 TB; 8 TB			1 TB; 2 TB; 4 TB; 8 TB	2 TB; 4 TB; 8 TB		
Connector	HDMI		HDMI 2.1							
Connector	SDXC card slot		Yes							
Connector	USB-C/Thunderbolt		Three Thunderbolt 4 USB-C ports supporting charging and DisplayPort protocols among others							
Connector	Transmission speed		Up to 40 Gbit/s transmission speed (Thunderbolt 4 or USB4)							
Connector	External display support	Maximum display	2		4		2		4	
Connector	External display support	One external display	1 × 6K at 60 Hz (Thunderbolt), or; 1 × 8K at 60 Hz (HDMI)							
Connector	External display support	Two external displays	2 × 6K at 60 Hz (Thunderbolt), or; 1 × 6K at 60 Hz (Thunderbolt) + 1 × 4K at 144 Hz (HDMI)		2 × 6K at 60 Hz (Thunderbolt), or; 1 × 6K at 60 Hz (Thunderbolt) + 1 × 8K at 60 Hz (HDMI)		2 × 6K at 60 Hz (Thunderbolt), or; 1 × 6K at 60 Hz (Thunderbolt) + 1 × 4K at 144 Hz (HDMI)		2 × 6K at 60 Hz (Thunderbolt), or; 1 × 6K at 60 Hz (Thunderbolt) + 1 × 8K at 60 Hz (HDMI)	
Connector	External display support	Three external displays	—N/a		3 × 6K at 60 Hz (Thunderbolt), or; 2 × 6K at 60 Hz (Thunderbolt) + 1 × 8K at 60 Hz (HDMI)		—N/a		3 × 6K at 60 Hz (Thunderbolt), or; 2 × 6K at 60 Hz (Thunderbolt) + 1 × 8K at 60 Hz (HDMI)	
Connector	External display support	Four external displays	—N/a		3 × 6K at 60 Hz (Thunderbolt) + 1 × 4K at 144 Hz (HDMI)		—N/a		3 × 6K at 60 Hz (Thunderbolt) + 1 × 4K at 144 Hz (HDMI)	
Connectivity	Wi-Fi		Wi-Fi 6E (802.11a/b/g/n/ac/ax)							
Connectivity	Bluetooth		Bluetooth 5.3							
Keyboard and trackpad	Type		Backlit Magic Keyboard with scissor-switch mechanism and ambient light sensor							
Keyboard and trackpad	Number of keys		78 (U.S.) or 79 (ISO)							
Keyboard and trackpad	Arrow keys		4 arrow keys in an inverted-T arrangement							
Keyboard and trackpad	Function keys		With full-height							
Keyboard and trackpad	Touch Bar		No							
Keyboard and trackpad	Trackpad		Force Touch trackpad							
Camera	Resolution		1080p FaceTime HD							
Camera	Advanced image signal processor with computational video		Yes							
Camera	Center Stage and Desk View		No							
Audio	Speakers		High-fidelity six-speakers							
Audio	Force-canceling woofers		Yes							
Audio	Wide stereo sound		Yes							
Audio	Dolby Atmos playback		Yes							
Audio	Dolby Atmos with built-in speakers		Yes							
Audio	Spatial Audio with dynamic head tracking		Yes							
Audio	Microphone		Studio-quality three-mic array with high signal-to-noise ratio and directional beamforming							
Audio	3.5 mm jack		With advanced support for high-impedance headphones							
Audio	Audio output from HDMI		Yes							
Power	Battery		11.47 V 69.6 W·h (6068 mA·h)				11.45 V 99.6 W·h (8693 mA·h)			
Power	Power adapter		67 W USB-C	96 W USB-C			140 W USB-C GaN			
Power	Optional configuration		96 W USB-C	—N/a						
Power	Charging method		MagSafe 3 or USB-C ports							
Power	Fast charge capability		96 W or 140 W USB-C through MagSafe 3 or USB-C ports				140 W USB-C through MagSafe 3			

==== M3 models ====
Model			14-inch, Nov 2023 (M3)			14-inch, Nov 2023 (M3 Pro or M3 Max)				16-inch, Nov 2023			
Basic info	Hardware strings		Mac15,3			Mac15,6		Mac15,10	Mac15,8	Mac15,7		Mac15,11	Mac15,9
Basic info	Model number		A2918			A2992				A2991			
Basic info	Part number		MTL73, MR7J3	MTL83, MR7K3	MXE03, MXE13	MRX33, MRX63	MRX43, MRX73	MRX53, MRX83	Build-to-order	MRW13, MRW43	MRW23, MRW63	MRW33, MRW73	MUW63, MUW73
Basic info	Date	Announced	October 30, 2023		March 4, 2024	October 30, 2023							
Basic info	Date	Released	November 7, 2023		March 8, 2024	November 7, 2023							
Basic info	Date	Discontinued	October 30, 2024										
Basic info	Date	Unsupported	Supported										
Basic info	Operating system	Initial	macOS Ventura 13.5			macOS Sonoma 14.1							
Basic info	Operating system	Latest	macOS Golden Gate 27.2										
Basic info	Colors												
Basic info	MSRP		US$1,599	US$1,799	US$1,999	US$1,999	US$2,199	US$2,999	US$3,499	US$2,499	US$2,899	US$3,299	US$3,799
Dimensions	Height		0.61 in (1.5 cm)							0.66 in (1.7 cm)			
Dimensions	Width		12.31 in (31.3 cm)							14.01 in (35.6 cm)			
Dimensions	Depth		8.71 in (22.1 cm)							9.77 in (24.8 cm)			
Dimensions	Weight		3.4 lb (1.54 kg)			3.5 lb (1.59 kg)		3.6 lb (1.63 kg)		4.7 lb (2.13 kg)		4.8 lb (2.18 kg)	
Secure authentication	Touch ID		Yes										
Display	Size	Diagonal	14.2 in (360 mm)							16.2 in (410 mm)			
Display	Size	Vertical-by-horizontal	11.91 by 7.73 in (303 by 196 mm)							13.61 by 8.79 in (346 by 223 mm)			
Display	Resolution	Vertical-by-horizontal	3024 × 1964							3456 × 2234			
Display	Resolution	Density	254 ppi										
Display	Resolution	Aspect ratio	9:5.85; 16:10 without notch							9:5.82; 16:10 without notch			
Display	Resolution	Supported scaled resolutions	1800 × 1169 (rendered as 3600 × 2338); 1512 × 982 (rendered as 3024 × 1964, default and native); 1352 × 878 (rendered as 2704 × 1756); 1147 × 745 (rendered as 2294 × 1490); 1024 × 665 (rendered as 2048 × 1330)							2056 × 1329 (rendered as 4112 × 2658); 1728 × 1117 (rendered as 3456 × 2234, default and native); 1496 × 967 (rendered as 2992 × 1934); 1312 × 848 (rendered as 2624 × 1696); 1168 × 755 (rendered as 2336 × 1510)			
Display	Technology		Liquid Retina XDR Display with IPS technology										
Display	Backlight		Mini-LED-backlit with 2010 full-array local dimming zones							Mini-LED-backlit with 2554 full-array local dimming zones			
Display	Nano-texture configuration		No										
Display	Refresh rate	Minimum	24 Hz										
Display	Refresh rate	Maximum	120 Hz										
Display	Refresh rate	ProMotion Display	Yes										
Display	Refresh rate	Supported fixed refresh rate	47.95 Hz, 48 Hz, 50 Hz, 59.95 Hz, 60 Hz										
Display	Brightness and contrast	SDR max brightness	600 nits										
Display	Brightness and contrast	XDR max brightness	1000 nits (sustained full-screen); 1600 nits (HDR content)										
Display	Brightness and contrast	Contrast ratio (typical)	1,000,000:1										
Display	Color	Full sRGB	Yes										
Display	Color	Wide color (P3)	Yes										
Display	Color	Color depth	10-bit (FRC) with 1 billion colors										
Display	Color	True Tone	Yes										
Display	Color	Night Shift	Yes										
Performance	Cooling system	Number of fan(s)	1			2							
Performance	Cooling system	Maximum RPM	6800 RPM			6800 RPM each		6898 RPM (left); 7450 RPM (right)		5349 RPM (left); 5777 RPM (right)			
Performance	Cooling system	Heat spreader	Aluminum heat spreader attached on processor										
Performance	Chip	Chip name	Apple M3			Apple M3 Pro		Apple M3 Max		Apple M3 Pro		Apple M3 Max	
Performance	Chip	Technology node	3 nm (N3B)										
Performance	Chip	Bit	64-bit										
Performance	Chip	Total CPU cores	8			11	12	14	16	12		14	16
Performance	Chip	High-performance cores	4 × 4.05 GHz			5 × 4.05 GHz	6 × 4.05 GHz	10 × 4.05 GHz	12 × 4.05 GHz	6 × 4.05 GHz		10 × 4.05 GHz	12 × 4.05 GHz
Performance	Chip	Energy-efficiency cores	4 × 2.75 GHz			6 × 2.75 GHz		4 × 2.57 GHz		6 × 2.75 GHz		4 × 2.57 GHz	
Performance	Chip	Online configuration	—N/a			12-core CPU	—N/a	16-core CPU	—N/a			16-core CPU	—N/a
Performance	Chip	Graphics processor	Apple G15G			Apple G15S		Apple G15C		Apple G15S		Apple G15C	
Performance	Chip	Total GPU cores	10			14	18	30	40	18		30	40
Performance	Chip	GPU family	Apple GPU Family 9										
Performance	Chip	Hardware-accelerated ray tracing	Yes										
Performance	Chip	Neural Accelerators in GPU	No										
Performance	Chip	Metal support	Metal 4										
Performance	Chip	Online configuration	—N/a			18-core GPU (requires 12-core CPU)	—N/a	40-core GPU (requires 16-core CPU)	—N/a			40-core GPU (requires 16-core CPU)	—N/a
Performance	Chip	Neural Engine	16-core (18 TOPS FP16)										
Performance	Chip	Media engine	Hardware-accelerated H.264, HEVC, ProRes and ProRes RAW; AV1 decode										
Performance	Chip	Apple Intelligence	Yes (currently not available in China mainland)										
Performance	Unified memory	Memory type	LPDDR5-6400 (3200 MHz)										
Performance	Unified memory	Memory bus width	128-bit			192-bit		384-bit	512-bit	192-bit		384-bit	512-bit
Performance	Unified memory	Memory bandwidth	102.4 GB/s			153.6 GB/s		307.2 GB/s	409.6 GB/s	153.6 GB/s		307.2 GB/s	409.6 GB/s
Performance	Unified memory	Memory size	8 GB		16 GB	18 GB		36 GB	48 GB	18 GB	36 GB		48 GB
Performance	Unified memory	Online configuration	16 GB; 24 GB		24 GB	36 GB		96 GB	64 GB; 128 GB	36 GB	—N/a	96 GB	64 GB; 128 GB
Performance	Storage	Storage type	PCIe 4.0-based SSD										
Performance	Storage	Storage speed	Up to 3.3 GB/s read speed			Up to 7.4 GB/s read speed							
Performance	Storage	Storage size	512 GB	1 TB		512 GB	1 TB			512 GB		1 TB	
Performance	Storage	Online configuration	1 TB; 2 TB	2 TB		1 TB; 2 TB; 4 TB	2 TB; 4 TB	2 TB; 4 TB; 8 TB		1 TB; 2 TB; 4 TB		2 TB; 4 TB; 8 TB	
Connector	HDMI		HDMI 2.1										
Connector	SDXC card slot		Yes										
Connector	USB-C/Thunderbolt		Two Thunderbolt 3/USB4 USB-C ports supporting charging and DisplayPort protocols among others			Three Thunderbolt 4 USB-C ports supporting charging and DisplayPort protocols among others							
Connector	Transmission speed		Up to 40 Gbit/s transmission speed (Thunderbolt 3 or USB4)			Up to 40 Gbit/s transmission speed (Thunderbolt 4 or USB4)							
Connector	External display support	Maximum display	1; 2 (with laptop lid closed) (Note: Requires macOS 14.6 and later)			2		4		2		4	
Connector	External display support	One external display	1 × 6K at 60 Hz (Thunderbolt), or; 1 × 4K at 144 Hz (HDMI)			1 × 6K at 60 Hz (Thunderbolt), or; 1 × 8K at 60 Hz (HDMI)							
Connector	External display support	Two external displays	1 × 6K at 60 Hz (Thunderbolt) + 1 × 5K at 60 Hz (Thunderbolt) with laptop lid closed, or; 1 × 6K at 60 Hz (Thunderbolt) + 1 × 4K at 100 Hz (HDMI) with laptop lid closed			2 × 6K at 60 Hz (Thunderbolt), or; 1 × 6K at 60 Hz (Thunderbolt) + 1 × 4K at 144 Hz (HDMI)		2 × 6K at 60 Hz (Thunderbolt), or; 1 × 6K at 60 Hz (Thunderbolt) + 1 × 8K at 60 Hz (HDMI)		2 × 6K at 60 Hz (Thunderbolt), or; 1 × 6K at 60 Hz (Thunderbolt) + 1 × 4K at 144 Hz (HDMI)		2 × 6K at 60 Hz (Thunderbolt), or; 1 × 6K at 60 Hz (Thunderbolt) + 1 × 8K at 60 Hz (HDMI)	
Connector	External display support	Three external displays	—N/a					3 × 6K at 60 Hz (Thunderbolt), or; 2 × 6K at 60 Hz (Thunderbolt) + 1 × 8K at 60 Hz (HDMI)		—N/a		3 × 6K at 60 Hz (Thunderbolt), or; 2 × 6K at 60 Hz (Thunderbolt) + 1 × 8K at 60 Hz (HDMI)	
Connector	External display support	Four external displays	—N/a					3 × 6K at 60 Hz (Thunderbolt) + 1 × 4K at 144 Hz (HDMI)		—N/a		3 × 6K at 60 Hz (Thunderbolt) + 1 × 4K at 144 Hz (HDMI)	
Connectivity	Wi-Fi		Wi-Fi 6E (802.11a/b/g/n/ac/ax)										
Connectivity	Bluetooth		Bluetooth 5.3										
Keyboard and trackpad	Type		Backlit Magic Keyboard with scissor-switch mechanism and ambient light sensor										
Keyboard and trackpad	Number of keys		78 (U.S.) or 79 (ISO)										
Keyboard and trackpad	Arrow keys		4 arrow keys in an inverted-T arrangement										
Keyboard and trackpad	Function keys		With full-height										
Keyboard and trackpad	Touch Bar		No										
Keyboard and trackpad	Trackpad		Force Touch trackpad										
Camera	Resolution		1080p FaceTime HD										
Camera	Advanced image signal processor with computational video		Yes										
Camera	Center Stage and Desk View		No										
Audio	Speakers		High-fidelity six-speakers										
Audio	Force-canceling woofers		Yes										
Audio	Wide stereo sound		Yes										
Audio	Dolby Atmos playback		Yes										
Audio	Dolby Atmos with built-in speakers		Yes										
Audio	Spatial Audio with dynamic head tracking		Yes										
Audio	Microphone		Studio-quality three-mic array with high signal-to-noise ratio and directional beamforming										
Audio	3.5 mm jack		With advanced support for high-impedance headphones										
Audio	Audio output from HDMI		Yes										
Power	Battery		72.4 W·h							11.45 V 99.6 W·h (8693 mA·h)			
Power	Power adapter		70 W USB-C				96 W USB-C			140 W USB-C GaN			
Power	Optional configuration		96 W USB-C				—N/a						
Power	Charging method		MagSafe 3 or USB-C ports										
Power	Fast charge capability		96 W or 140 W USB-C through MagSafe 3 or USB-C ports							140 W USB-C through MagSafe 3 or USB-C ports with 240 W USB-C cable			

==== M4 models ====
Model			14-inch, 2024 (M4)			14-inch, 2024 (M4 Pro or M4 Max)				16-inch, 2024			
Basic info	Hardware strings		Mac16,1			Mac16,8		Mac16,6		Mac16,7		Mac16,5	
Basic info	Model number		A3112			A3401		A3185		A3403		A3186	
Basic info	Part number		MW2U3, MW2W3	MW2V3, MW2X3	MCX04, MCX14	MX2H3, MX2E3	MX2J3, MX2F3	MX2K3, MX2G3	Build-to-order	MX2X3, MX2T3	MX2Y3, MX2U3	MX303, MX2V3	MX313, MX2W3
Basic info	Date	Announced	October 30, 2024										
Basic info	Date	Released	November 8, 2024										
Basic info	Date	Discontinued	October 14, 2025			March 3, 2026							
Basic info	Date	Unsupported	Supported										
Basic info	Operating system	Initial	macOS Sequoia 15.0			macOS Sequoia 15.1							
Basic info	Operating system	Latest	macOS Golden Gate 27.2										
Basic info	Colors												
Basic info	MSRP		US$1,599	US$1,799	US$1,999	US$1,999	US$2,399	US$3,199	US$3,699	US$2,499	US$2,899	US$3,499	US$3,999
Dimensions	Height		0.61 in (1.5 cm)							0.66 in (1.7 cm)			
Dimensions	Width		12.31 in (31.3 cm)							14.01 in (35.6 cm)			
Dimensions	Depth		8.71 in (22.1 cm)							9.77 in (24.8 cm)			
Dimensions	Weight		3.4 lb (1.54 kg)			3.5 lb (1.59 kg)		3.6 lb (1.63 kg)		4.7 lb (2.13 kg)			
Secure authentication	Touch ID		Yes										
Display	Size	Diagonal	14.2 in (360 mm)							16.2 in (410 mm)			
Display	Size	Vertical-by-horizontal	11.91 by 7.73 in (303 by 196 mm)							13.61 by 8.79 in (346 by 223 mm)			
Display	Resolution	Vertical-by-horizontal	3024 × 1964							3456 × 2234			
Display	Resolution	Density	254 ppi										
Display	Resolution	Aspect ratio	9:5.85; 16:10 without notch							9:5.82; 16:10 without notch			
Display	Resolution	Supported scaled resolutions	1800 × 1169 (rendered as 3600 × 2338); 1512 × 982 (rendered as 3024 × 1964, default and native); 1352 × 878 (rendered as 2704 × 1756); 1147 × 745 (rendered as 2294 × 1490); 1024 × 665 (rendered as 2048 × 1330)							2056 × 1329 (rendered as 4112 × 2658); 1728 × 1117 (rendered as 3456 × 2234, default and native); 1496 × 967 (rendered as 2992 × 1934); 1312 × 848 (rendered as 2624 × 1696); 1168 × 755 (rendered as 2336 × 1510)			
Display	Technology		Liquid Retina XDR Display with IPS and quantum dot technology										
Display	Backlight		Mini-LED-backlit with 2010 full-array local dimming zones							Mini-LED-backlit with 2554 full-array local dimming zones			
Display	Nano-texture configuration		Yes										
Display	Refresh rate	Minimum	24 Hz										
Display	Refresh rate	Maximum	120 Hz										
Display	Refresh rate	ProMotion Display	Yes										
Display	Refresh rate	Supported fixed refresh rate	47.95 Hz, 48 Hz, 50 Hz, 59.95 Hz, 60 Hz										
Display	Brightness and contrast	SDR max brightness	1000 nits										
Display	Brightness and contrast	XDR max brightness	1000 nits (sustained full-screen); 1600 nits (HDR content)										
Display	Brightness and contrast	Contrast ratio (typical)	1,000,000:1										
Display	Color	Full sRGB	Yes										
Display	Color	Wide color (P3)	Yes										
Display	Color	Color depth	10-bit (FRC) with 1 billion colors										
Display	Color	True Tone	Yes										
Display	Color	Night Shift	Yes										
Performance	Cooling system	Number of fan(s)	1			2							
Performance	Cooling system	Maximum RPM	6550 RPM			7826 RPM each				5777 RPM each			
Performance	Cooling system	Heat spreader	Aluminum heat spreader attached on processor										
Performance	Chip	Chip name	Apple M4			Apple M4 Pro		Apple M4 Max		Apple M4 Pro		Apple M4 Max	
Performance	Chip	Technology node	3 nm (N3E)										
Performance	Chip	Bit	64-bit										
Performance	Chip	Total CPU cores	10			12	14		16	14			16
Performance	Chip	High-performance cores	4 × 4.41 GHz			8 × 4.51 GHz	10 × 4.51 GHz		12 × 4.51 GHz	10 × 4.51 GHz			12 × 4.51 GHz
Performance	Chip	Energy-efficiency cores	6 × 2.89 GHz			4 × 2.59 GHz							
Performance	Chip	Online configuration	—N/a			14-core CPU	—N/a	16-core CPU	—N/a			16-core CPU	—N/a
Performance	Chip	Graphics processor	Apple G16G			Apple G16S		Apple G16C		Apple G16S		Apple G16C	
Performance	Chip	Total GPU cores	10			16	20	32	40	20		32	40
Performance	Chip	GPU family	Apple GPU Family 9										
Performance	Chip	Hardware-accelerated ray tracing	Yes										
Performance	Chip	Neural Accelerators in GPU	No										
Performance	Chip	Metal support	Metal 4										
Performance	Chip	Online configuration	—N/a			20-core GPU (requires 14-core CPU)	—N/a	40-core GPU (requires 16-core CPU)	—N/a			40-core GPU (requires 16-core CPU)	—N/a
Performance	Chip	Neural Engine	16-core (38 TOPS INT8)										
Performance	Chip	Media engine	Hardware-accelerated H.264, HEVC, ProRes and ProRes RAW; AV1 decode										
Performance	Chip	Apple Intelligence	Yes (currently not available in China mainland)										
Performance	Unified memory	Memory type	LPDDR5X-7500 (3750 MHz)			LPDDR5X-8533 (4266 MHz)							
Performance	Unified memory	Memory bus width	128-bit			256-bit		384-bit	512-bit	256-bit		384-bit	512-bit
Performance	Unified memory	Memory bandwidth	120 GB/s			273 GB/s		409.5 GB/s	546 GB/s	273 GB/s		409.5 GB/s	546 GB/s
Performance	Unified memory	Memory size	16 GB		24 GB			36 GB	48 GB	24 GB	48 GB	36 GB	48 GB
Performance	Unified memory	Online configuration	24 GB; 32 GB		32 GB	48 GB		—N/a	64 GB; 128 GB	48 GB	—N/a		64 GB; 128 GB
Performance	Storage	Storage type	PCIe 4.0-based SSD										
Performance	Storage	Storage speed	Up to 3.3 GB/s read speed			Up to 7.4 GB/s read speed							
Performance	Storage	Storage size	512 GB	1 TB			512 GB		1 TB		512 GB	1 TB	
Performance	Storage	Online configuration	1 TB; 2 TB	2 TB		1 TB; 2 TB; 4 TB	2 TB; 4 TB	2 TB; 4 TB; 8 TB		1 TB; 2 TB; 4 TB		2 TB; 4 TB; 8 TB	
Connector	HDMI		HDMI 2.1										
Connector	SDXC card slot		Yes										
Connector	USB-C/Thunderbolt		Three Thunderbolt 4 USB-C ports supporting charging and DisplayPort protocols among others			Three Thunderbolt 5 USB-C ports supporting charging and DisplayPort protocols among others							
Connector	Transmission speed		Up to 40 Gbit/s transmission speed (Thunderbolt 4 or USB4)			Up to 120 Gbit/s transmission speed (Thunderbolt 5 or USB4)							
Connector	External display support	Maximum display	2					4		2		4	
Connector	External display support	One external display	1 × 8K at 60 Hz (or 5K at 120 Hz or 4K at 240 Hz) (Thunderbolt or HDMI)										
Connector	External display support	Two external displays	2 × 6K at 60 Hz (or 4K at 144 Hz) (Thunderbolt or HDMI)					2 × 8K at 60 Hz (or 5K at 120 Hz or 4K at 240 Hz) (Thunderbolt or HDMI)		2 × 6K at 60 Hz (or 4K at 144 Hz) (Thunderbolt or HDMI)		2 × 8K at 60 Hz (or 5K at 120 Hz or 4K at 240 Hz) (Thunderbolt or HDMI)	
Connector	External display support	Three external displays	—N/a					2 × 6K at 60 Hz (or 4K at 144 Hz) + 1 × 8K at 60 Hz (or 5K at 120 Hz or 4K at 240 Hz) (Thunderbolt or HDMI)		—N/a		2 × 6K at 60 Hz (or 4K at 144 Hz) + 1 × 8K at 60 Hz (or 5K at 120 Hz or 4K at 240 Hz) (Thunderbolt or HDMI)	
Connector	External display support	Four external displays	—N/a					4 × 6K at 60 Hz (or 4K at 144 Hz) (Thunderbolt or HDMI)		—N/a		4 × 6K at 60 Hz (or 4K at 144 Hz) (Thunderbolt or HDMI)	
Connectivity	Wi-Fi		Wi-Fi 6E (802.11a/b/g/n/ac/ax)										
Connectivity	Bluetooth		Bluetooth 5.3										
Keyboard and trackpad	Type		Backlit Magic Keyboard with scissor-switch mechanism and ambient light sensor										
Keyboard and trackpad	Number of keys		78 (U.S.) or 79 (ISO)										
Keyboard and trackpad	Arrow keys		4 arrow keys in an inverted-T arrangement										
Keyboard and trackpad	Function keys		With full-height										
Keyboard and trackpad	Touch Bar		No										
Keyboard and trackpad	Trackpad		Force Touch trackpad										
Camera	Resolution		12 MP camera with 1080p FaceTime HD										
Camera	Advanced image signal processor with computational video		Yes										
Camera	Center Stage and Desk View		Yes										
Audio	Speakers		High-fidelity six-speakers										
Audio	Force-canceling woofers		Yes										
Audio	Wide stereo sound		Yes										
Audio	Dolby Atmos playback		Yes										
Audio	Dolby Atmos with built-in speakers		Yes										
Audio	Spatial Audio with dynamic head tracking		Yes										
Audio	Microphone		Studio-quality three-mic array with high signal-to-noise ratio and directional beamforming										
Audio	3.5 mm jack		With advanced support for high-impedance headphones										
Audio	Audio output from HDMI		Yes										
Power	Battery		72.4 W·h							11.45 V 99.6 W·h (8693 mA·h)			
Power	Power adapter		70 W USB-C				96 W USB-C			140 W USB-C GaN			
Power	Optional configuration		96 W USB-C				—N/a						
Power	Charging method		MagSafe 3 or USB-C ports										
Power	Fast charge capability		96 W or 140 W USB-C through MagSafe 3 or USB-C ports							140 W USB-C through MagSafe 3 or USB-C ports with 240 W USB-C cable			

==== M5 models ====
Model			14-inch (M5)				14-inch (M5 Pro)			14-inch (M5 Max)		16-inch (M5 Pro)		16-inch (M5 Max)	
Basic info	Hardware strings		Mac17,2				Mac17,9			Mac17,7		Mac17,8		Mac17,6	
Basic info	Model number		A3434				A3426			A3427		A3428		A3429	
Basic info	Part number		MDE04, MDE44	MDE14, MDE54	MDE34, MDE64	MJ3D4, MJ3E4	MGDR4, MGDN4	MJLW4, MJLV4	MGDT4, MGDP4	MGDU4, MGDQ4	Build-to-order	MGEA4, MGE44	MGEC4, MGE64	MGED4, MGE74	MGEE4, MGE94
Basic info	Date	Announced	October 14, 2025			March 3, 2026									
Basic info	Date	Released	October 22, 2025			March 11, 2026									
Basic info	Date	Discontinued	March 3, 2026	October 27, 2026			In production								
Basic info	Date	Unsupported	Supported												
Basic info	Operating system	Initial	macOS Tahoe 26.0				macOS Tahoe 26.3								
Basic info	Operating system	Latest	macOS Golden Gate 27.2												
Basic info	Colors														
Basic info	MSRP		US$1,599	US$1,999 (Note: The MSRP was US$1,799 before March 3, 2026, and $1699 before June 25, 2026.)	US$2,199 (Note: The MSRP was US$1,999 before March 3, 2026, and US$1,899 before June 25, 2026.)	US$2,399 (Note: The MSRP was US$2,099 before June 25, 2026.)	US$2,499 (Note: The MSRP was US$2,199 before June 25, 2026.)	US$2,999 (Note: The MSRP was US$2,599 before June 25, 2026.)	US$3,199 (Note: The MSRP was US$2,799 before June 25, 2026.)	US$4,099 (Note: The MSRP was US$3,599 before June 25, 2026.)	US$4,699 (Note: The MSRP was US$4,099 before June 25, 2026.)	US$2,999 (Note: The MSRP was US$2,699 before June 25, 2026.)	US$3,599 (Note: The MSRP was US$3,099 before June 25, 2026.)	US$4,399 (Note: The MSRP was US$3,899 before June 25, 2026.)	US$4,999 (Note: The MSRP was US$4,399 before June 25, 2026.)
Dimensions	Height		0.61 in (1.5 cm)									0.66 in (1.7 cm)			
Dimensions	Width		12.31 in (31.3 cm)									14.01 in (35.6 cm)			
Dimensions	Depth		8.71 in (22.1 cm)									9.77 in (24.8 cm)			
Dimensions	Weight		3.4 lb (1.54 kg)				3.5 lb (1.59 kg)			3.6 lb (1.63 kg)		4.7 lb (2.13 kg)			
Secure authentication	Touch ID		Yes												
Display	Size	Diagonal	14.2 in (360 mm)									16.2 in (410 mm)			
Display	Size	Vertical-by-horizontal	11.91 by 7.73 in (303 by 196 mm)									13.61 by 8.79 in (346 by 223 mm)			
Display	Resolution	Vertical-by-horizontal	3024 × 1964									3456 × 2234			
Display	Resolution	Density	254 ppi												
Display	Resolution	Aspect ratio	9:5.85; 16:10 without notch									9:5.82; 16:10 without notch			
Display	Resolution	Supported scaled resolutions	1800 × 1169 (rendered as 3600 × 2338); 1512 × 982 (rendered as 3024 × 1964, default and native); 1352 × 878 (rendered as 2704 × 1756); 1147 × 745 (rendered as 2294 × 1490); 1024 × 665 (rendered as 2048 × 1330)									2056 × 1329 (rendered as 4112 × 2658); 1728 × 1117 (rendered as 3456 × 2234, default and native); 1496 × 967 (rendered as 2992 × 1934); 1312 × 848 (rendered as 2624 × 1696); 1168 × 755 (rendered as 2336 × 1510)			
Display	Technology		Liquid Retina XDR Display with IPS and quantum dot technology												
Display	Backlight		Mini-LED-backlit with 2010 full-array local dimming zones									Mini-LED-backlit with 2554 full-array local dimming zones			
Display	Nano-texture configuration		Yes												
Display	Refresh rate	Minimum	24 Hz												
Display	Refresh rate	Maximum	120 Hz												
Display	Refresh rate	ProMotion Display	Yes												
Display	Refresh rate	Supported fixed refresh rate	47.95 Hz, 48 Hz, 50 Hz, 59.95 Hz, 60 Hz												
Display	Brightness and contrast	SDR max brightness	1000 nits												
Display	Brightness and contrast	XDR max brightness	1000 nits (sustained full-screen); 1600 nits (HDR content)												
Display	Brightness and contrast	Contrast ratio (typical)	1,000,000:1												
Display	Color	Full sRGB	Yes												
Display	Color	Wide color (P3)	Yes												
Display	Color	Color depth	10-bit (FRC) with 1 billion colors												
Display	Color	True Tone	Yes												
Display	Color	Night Shift	Yes												
Performance	Cooling system	Number of fan(s)	1				2								
Performance	Cooling system	Maximum RPM	6550 RPM				7826 RPM each					5777 RPM each			
Performance	Cooling system	Heat spreader	Aluminum heat spreader attached on processor												
Performance	Chip	Chip name	Apple M5				Apple M5 Pro			Apple M5 Max		Apple M5 Pro		Apple M5 Max	
Performance	Chip	Technology node	3 nm (N3P)												
Performance	Chip	Bit	64-bit												
Performance	Chip	Total CPU cores	10				15		18						
Performance	Chip	High-performance cores	4 × 4.61 GHz (Super cores)				5 × 4.61 GHz (Super cores); 10 × 4.38 GHz (Perf cores)		6 × 4.61 GHz (Super cores); 12 × 4.38 GHz (Perf cores)						
Performance	Chip	Energy-efficiency cores	6 × 3.04 GHz				—N/a								
Performance	Chip	Online configuration	—N/a				18-core CPU		—N/a						
Performance	Chip	Graphics processor	Apple G17G				Apple G17S			Apple G17C		Apple G17S		Apple G17C	
Performance	Chip	Total GPU cores	10				16		20	32	40	20		32	40
Performance	Chip	GPU family	Apple GPU Family 10												
Performance	Chip	Hardware-accelerated ray tracing	Yes												
Performance	Chip	Neural Accelerators in GPU	Yes												
Performance	Chip	Metal support	Metal 4												
Performance	Chip	Online configuration	—N/a				20-core GPU (requires 18-core CPU)		—N/a	40-core GPU	—N/a			40-core GPU	—N/a
Performance	Chip	Neural Engine	16-core												
Performance	Chip	Media engine	Hardware-accelerated H.264, HEVC, ProRes and ProRes RAW; AV1 decode												
Performance	Chip	Apple Intelligence	Yes (currently not available in China mainland)												
Performance	Unified memory	Memory type	LPDDR5X-9600 (4800 MHz)												
Performance	Unified memory	Memory bus width	128-bit				256-bit			384-bit	512-bit	256-bit		384-bit	512-bit
Performance	Unified memory	Memory bandwidth	153.6 GB/s				307.2 GB/s			460.8 GB/s	614.4 GB/s	307.2 GB/s		460.8 GB/s	614.4 GB/s
Performance	Unified memory	Memory size	16 GB		24 GB	32 GB	24 GB			36 GB	48 GB	24 GB	48 GB	36 GB	48 GB
Performance	Unified memory	Online configuration	24 GB; 32 GB		32 GB	—N/a	48 GB		48 GB; 64 GB	—N/a	64 GB; 128 GB	48 GB; 64 GB	64 GB	—N/a	64 GB; 128 GB
Performance	Storage	Storage type	PCIe 5.0-based SSD												
Performance	Storage	Storage speed	Up to 6.6 GB/s read speed				Up to 14.5 GB/s read speed								
Performance	Storage	Storage size	512 GB	1 TB				2 TB				1 TB		2 TB	
Performance	Storage	Online configuration	1 TB; 2 TB; 4 TB	2 TB; 4 TB				4 TB		4 TB; 8 TB		2 TB; 4 TB; 8 TB		4 TB; 8 TB	
Connector	HDMI		HDMI 2.1												
Connector	SDXC card slot		Yes												
Connector	USB-C/Thunderbolt		Three Thunderbolt 4 USB-C ports supporting charging and DisplayPort protocols among others				Three Thunderbolt 5 USB-C ports supporting charging and DisplayPort protocols among others								
Connector	Transmission speed		Up to 40 Gbit/s transmission speed (Thunderbolt 4 or USB4)				Up to 120 Gbit/s transmission speed (Thunderbolt 5 or USB4)								
Connector	External display support	Maximum display	2				3			4		3		4	
Connector	External display support	One external display	1 × 8K at 60 Hz (or 5K at 120 Hz or 4K at 240 Hz) (Thunderbolt or HDMI)												
Connector	External display support	Two external displays	2 × 6K at 60 Hz (or 4K at 144 Hz) (Thunderbolt or HDMI)				1 × 5K at 120 Hz (or 4K at 200 Hz) + 1 × 8K at 60 Hz (or 5K at 120 Hz or 4K at 240 Hz) (Thunderbolt or HDMI)			2 × 8K at 60 Hz (or 5K at 120 Hz or 4K at 240 Hz) (Thunderbolt or HDMI)		1 × 5K at 120 Hz (or 4K at 200 Hz) + 1 × 8K at 60 Hz (or 5K at 120 Hz or 4K at 240 Hz) (Thunderbolt or HDMI)		2 × 8K at 60 Hz (or 5K at 120 Hz or 4K at 240 Hz) (Thunderbolt or HDMI)	
Connector	External display support	Three external displays	—N/a				3 × 6K at 60 Hz (or 4K at 144 Hz) (Thunderbolt or HDMI)			2 × 6K at 60 Hz (or 4K at 144 Hz) + 1 × 8K at 60 Hz (or 5K at 120 Hz or 4K at 240 Hz) (Thunderbolt or HDMI)		3 × 6K at 60 Hz (or 4K at 144 Hz) (Thunderbolt or HDMI)		2 × 6K at 60 Hz (or 4K at 144 Hz) + 1 × 8K at 60 Hz (or 5K at 120 Hz or 4K at 240 Hz) (Thunderbolt or HDMI)	
Connector	External display support	Four external displays	—N/a							4 × 6K at 60 Hz (or 4K at 144 Hz) (Thunderbolt or HDMI)		—N/a		4 × 6K at 60 Hz (or 4K at 144 Hz) (Thunderbolt or HDMI)	
Connectivity	Wi-Fi		Wi-Fi 6E (802.11a/b/g/n/ac/ax)				Wi-Fi 7 (802.11a/b/g/n/ac/ax/be)								
Connectivity	Bluetooth		Bluetooth 5.3				Bluetooth 6								
Keyboard and trackpad	Type		Backlit Magic Keyboard with scissor-switch mechanism and ambient light sensor												
Keyboard and trackpad	Number of keys		78 (U.S.) or 79 (ISO)												
Keyboard and trackpad	Arrow keys		4 arrow keys in an inverted-T arrangement												
Keyboard and trackpad	Function keys		With full-height												
Keyboard and trackpad	Touch Bar		No												
Keyboard and trackpad	Trackpad		Force Touch trackpad												
Camera	Resolution		12 MP camera with 1080p FaceTime HD												
Camera	Advanced image signal processor with computational video		Yes												
Camera	Center Stage and Desk View		Yes												
Audio	Speakers		High-fidelity six-speakers												
Audio	Force-canceling woofers		Yes												
Audio	Wide stereo sound		Yes												
Audio	Dolby Atmos playback		Yes												
Audio	Dolby Atmos with built-in speakers		Yes												
Audio	Spatial Audio with dynamic head tracking		Yes												
Audio	Microphone		Studio-quality three-mic array with high signal-to-noise ratio and directional beamforming, including Voice Isolation and Wide Spectrum microphone modes												
Audio	3.5 mm jack		With advanced support for high-impedance headphones												
Audio	Audio output from HDMI		Yes												
Power	Battery		72.4 W·h									11.45 V 99.6 W·h (8693 mA·h)			
Power	Power adapter		70 W USB-C; Charger is not included in Europe						96 W USB-C; Charger is not included in Europe			140 W USB-C GaN; Charger is not included in Europe			
Power	Optional configuration		70 W USB-C (Europe); 96 W USB-C						96 W USB-C (Europe)			140 W USB-C (Europe)			
Power	Charging method		MagSafe 3 or USB-C ports												
Power	Fast charge capability		96 W or 140 W USB-C through MagSafe 3 or USB-C ports									140 W USB-C through MagSafe 3 or USB-C ports with 240 W USB-C cable			

==== M6 models ====
Model			14-inch (M6)		
Basic info	Hardware strings		Mac18,1		
Basic info	Model number		A3536		
Basic info	Part number		MHWT4, MHWW4	MHWU4, MHWX4	MHWV4, MHWY4
Basic info	Date	Announced	October 27, 2026		
Basic info	Date	Released	November 6, 2026		
Basic info	Date	Discontinued	In production		
Basic info	Date	Unsupported	Supported		
Basic info	Operating system	Initial	macOS Golden Gate 27.0		
Basic info	Operating system	Latest	macOS Golden Gate 27.2		
Basic info	Colors				
Basic info	MSRP		US$1,999	US$2,199	US$2,399
Dimensions	Height		0.61 in (1.5 cm)		
Dimensions	Width		12.31 in (31.3 cm)		
Dimensions	Depth		8.71 in (22.1 cm)		
Dimensions	Weight		3.4 lb (1.54 kg)		
Secure authentication	Touch ID		Yes		
Display	Size	Diagonal	14.2 in (360 mm)		
Display	Size	Vertical-by-horizontal	11.91 by 7.73 in (303 by 196 mm)		
Display	Resolution	Vertical-by-horizontal	3024 × 1964		
Display	Resolution	Density	254 ppi		
Display	Resolution	Aspect ratio	9:5.85; 16:10 without notch		
Display	Resolution	Supported scaled resolutions	1800 × 1169 (rendered as 3600 × 2338); 1512 × 982 (rendered as 3024 × 1964, default and native); 1352 × 878 (rendered as 2704 × 1756); 1147 × 745 (rendered as 2294 × 1490); 1024 × 665 (rendered as 2048 × 1330)		
Display	Technology		Liquid Retina XDR Display with IPS and quantum dot technology		
Display	Backlight		Mini-LED-backlit with 2010 full-array local dimming zones		
Display	Nano-texture configuration		Yes		
Display	Refresh rate	Minimum	24 Hz		
Display	Refresh rate	Maximum	120 Hz		
Display	Refresh rate	ProMotion Display	Yes		
Display	Refresh rate	Supported fixed refresh rate	47.95 Hz, 48 Hz, 50 Hz, 59.95 Hz, 60 Hz		
Display	Brightness and contrast	SDR max brightness	1000 nits		
Display	Brightness and contrast	XDR max brightness	1000 nits (sustained full-screen); 1600 nits (HDR content)		
Display	Brightness and contrast	Contrast ratio (typical)	1,000,000:1		
Display	Color	Full sRGB	Yes		
Display	Color	Wide color (P3)	Yes		
Display	Color	Color depth	10-bit (FRC) with 1 billion colors		
Display	Color	True Tone	Yes		
Display	Color	Night Shift	Yes		
Performance	Cooling system	Number of fan(s)	1		
Performance	Cooling system	Maximum RPM	6550 RPM		
Performance	Cooling system	Heat spreader	Aluminum heat spreader attached on processor		
Performance	Chip	Chip name	Apple M6		
Performance	Chip	Technology node	2 nm (N2)		
Performance	Chip	Bit	64-bit		
Performance	Chip	Total CPU cores	12		
Performance	Chip	High-performance cores	2 × 4.79 GHz (Super cores); 4 × 4.51 GHz (Perf cores)		
Performance	Chip	Energy-efficiency cores	6 × 2.94 GHz		
Performance	Chip	Online configuration	—N/a		
Performance	Chip	Graphics processor	Apple G18G		
Performance	Chip	Total GPU cores	12		
Performance	Chip	GPU family	Apple GPU Family 11		
Performance	Chip	Hardware-accelerated ray tracing	Yes		
Performance	Chip	Neural Accelerators in GPU	Yes		
Performance	Chip	Metal support	Metal 4		
Performance	Chip	Online configuration	—N/a		
Performance	Chip	Neural Engine	Dual 16-core		
Performance	Chip	Media engine	Hardware-accelerated H.264, HEVC, ProRes and ProRes RAW; AV1 decode		
Performance	Chip	Apple Intelligence	Yes (currently not available in China mainland)		
Performance	Unified memory	Memory type	LPDDR5X-9600 (4800 MHz)	LPDDR5X-10667 (5333 MHz)	
Performance	Unified memory	Memory bus width	128-bit		
Performance	Unified memory	Memory bandwidth	153.6 GB/s	170.7 GB/s	
Performance	Unified memory	Memory size	16 GB	24 GB	32 GB
Performance	Unified memory	Online configuration	24 GB (LPDDR5X-10667); 32 GB (LPDDR5X-10667)	32 GB	—N/a
Performance	Storage	Storage type	PCIe 5.0-based SSD		
Performance	Storage	Storage speed	Up to 6.6 GB/s read speed		
Performance	Storage	Storage size	1 TB		
Performance	Storage	Online configuration	2 TB; 4 TB		
Connector	HDMI		HDMI 2.1		
Connector	SDXC card slot		Yes		
Connector	USB-C/Thunderbolt		Three Thunderbolt 4 USB-C ports supporting charging and DisplayPort protocols among others		
Connector	Transmission speed		Up to 40 Gbit/s transmission speed (Thunderbolt 4 or USB4)		
Connector	External display support	Maximum display	2		
Connector	External display support	One external display	1 × 8K at 60 Hz (or 5K at 120 Hz or 4K at 240 Hz) (Thunderbolt or HDMI)		
Connector	External display support	Two external displays	2 × 6K at 60 Hz (or 4K at 165 Hz) (Thunderbolt or HDMI)		
Connector	External display support	Three external displays	—N/a		
Connector	External display support	Four external displays	—N/a		
Connectivity	Wi-Fi		Wi-Fi 7 (802.11a/b/g/n/ac/ax/be)		
Connectivity	Bluetooth		Bluetooth 6		
Keyboard and trackpad	Type		Backlit Magic Keyboard with scissor-switch mechanism and ambient light sensor		
Keyboard and trackpad	Number of keys		78 (U.S.) or 79 (ISO)		
Keyboard and trackpad	Arrow keys		4 arrow keys in an inverted-T arrangement		
Keyboard and trackpad	Function keys		With full-height		
Keyboard and trackpad	Touch Bar		No		
Keyboard and trackpad	Trackpad		Force Touch trackpad		
Camera	Resolution		12 MP camera with 1080p FaceTime HD		
Camera	Advanced image signal processor with computational video		Yes		
Camera	Center Stage and Desk View		Yes		
Audio	Speakers		High-fidelity six-speakers		
Audio	Force-canceling woofers		Yes		
Audio	Wide stereo sound		Yes		
Audio	Dolby Atmos playback		Yes		
Audio	Dolby Atmos with built-in speakers		Yes		
Audio	Spatial Audio with dynamic head tracking		Yes		
Audio	Microphone		Studio-quality three-mic array with high signal-to-noise ratio and directional beamforming, including Voice Isolation and Wide Spectrum microphone modes		
Audio	3.5 mm jack		With advanced support for high-impedance headphones		
Audio	Audio output from HDMI		Yes		
Power	Battery		72.4 W·h		
Power	Power adapter		70 W USB-C; Charger is not included in Europe		
Power	Optional configuration		70 W USB-C (Europe); 96 W USB-C		
Power	Charging method		MagSafe 3 or USB-C ports		
Power	Fast charge capability		96 W or 140 W USB-C through MagSafe 3 or USB-C ports		

== 14-inch and 16-inch with PROLED XDR display (2026–present) ==
The 14-inch and 16-inch MacBook Pro models with PROLED XDR displays were announced on October 28, 2026, at a press release, and were released on November 6. The models are the first Macs to contain OLED and touchscreen displays, and replace the notch at the top of the display with a Dynamic Island similar to that found on the iPhone. They also include improved speakers designed to function when the lid is closed, up to 16 TB of storage, and return the backlit Apple logo to the rear of the display, which was removed with the 2016 models. They use the same M5 Pro and M5 Max chips as the 14-inch and 16-inch models introduced in March 2026, which continue to be sold.

=== Technical specifications ===
Discontinued	Current

==== M5 Pro and M5 Max models ====
Model			14-inch PROLED XDR (M5 Pro)			14-inch PROLED XDR (M5 Max)		16-inch PROLED XDR (M5 Pro)		16-inch PROLED XDR (M5 Max)	
Basic info	Hardware strings		Mac17,13			Mac17,11		Mac17,12		Mac17,10	
Basic info	Model number		A3468			A3375		A3469		A3376	
Basic info	Part number		MJ2K4, MJ2G4	Build-to-order	MMF64, MMF54	MJ2M4, MJ2J4	Build-to-order	MJ304, MJ2W4	MMFA4, MMF94	MJ314, MJ2X4	MJ334, MJ2Y4
Basic info	Date	Announced	October 28, 2026								
Basic info	Date	Released	November 6, 2026								
Basic info	Date	Discontinued	In production								
Basic info	Date	Unsupported	Supported								
Basic info	Operating system	Initial	macOS Golden Gate 27.2								
Basic info	Operating system	Latest	macOS Golden Gate 27.2								
Basic info	Colors										
Basic info	MSRP		US$2,899	US$3,099	US$3,699	US$4,499	US$5,099	US$3,399	US$3,999	US$4,799	US$5,399
Dimensions	Height		0.59 in (1.5 cm)					0.63 in (1.6 cm)			
Dimensions	Width		12.24 in (31.1 cm)					14.0 in (36 cm)			
Dimensions	Depth		8.52 in (21.6 cm)					9.62 in (24.4 cm)			
Dimensions	Weight		3.0 lb (1.36 kg)			3.1 lb (1.41 kg)		4.0 lb (1.81 kg)		4.1 lb (1.86 kg)	
Secure authentication	Touch ID		Yes								
Display	Size	Diagonal	14.2 in (360 mm)					16.3 in (410 mm)			
Display	Size	Vertical-by-horizontal	11.87 by 7.80 in (301 by 198 mm)					13.65 by 8.91 in (347 by 226 mm)			
Display	Resolution	Vertical-by-horizontal	3024 × 1986					3472 × 2266			
Display	Resolution	Density	254 ppi								
Display	Resolution	Aspect ratio	9:5.91; 16:10 without Dynamic Island					9:5.87; 16:10 without Dynamic Island			
Display	Resolution	Supported scaled resolutions	1800 × 1182 (rendered as 3600 × 2364); 1512 × 993 (rendered as 3024 × 1986, default and native); 1352 × 888 (rendered as 2704 × 1776); 1147 × 753 (rendered as 2294 × 1506); 1025 × 673 (rendered as 2050 × 1346)					2064 × 1347 (rendered as 4128 × 2694); 1736 × 1133 (rendered as 3472 × 2266, default and native); 1497 × 977 (rendered as 2994 × 1954); 1316 × 859 (rendered as 2632 × 1718); 1166 × 761 (rendered as 2332 × 1522)			
Display	Technology		PROLED XDR Display with Tandem OLED								
Display	Backlight		—N/a								
Display	Nano-texture configuration		Yes								
Display	Multi-touch		Yes								
Display	Dynamic Island		Yes								
Display	Refresh rate	Minimum	10 Hz								
Display	Refresh rate	Maximum	120 Hz								
Display	Refresh rate	ProMotion Display	Yes								
Display	Refresh rate	Supported fixed refresh rate	47.95 Hz, 48 Hz, 50 Hz, 59.95 Hz, 60 Hz								
Display	Brightness and contrast	SDR max brightness	1000 nits sustained full-screen 2000 nits (outdoor)								
Display	Brightness and contrast	XDR max brightness	1000 nits sustained full-screen 2000 nits (HDR content)								
Display	Brightness and contrast	Contrast ratio (typical)	10,000,000:1								
Display	Color	Full sRGB	Yes								
Display	Color	Wide color (P3)	Yes								
Display	Color	Wide color (Adobe RGB)	Yes								
Display	Color	Color depth	10-bit (FRC) with 1 billion colors								
Display	Color	True Tone	Yes								
Display	Color	Night Shift	Yes								
Performance	Cooling system	Number of fan(s)	2								
Performance	Cooling system	Maximum RPM	? RPM each					? RPM each			
Performance	Cooling system	Heat spreader	Aluminum heat spreader attached on processor								
Performance	Chip	Chip name	Apple M5 Pro			Apple M5 Max		Apple M5 Pro		Apple M5 Max	
Performance	Chip	Technology node	3 nm (N3P)								
Performance	Chip	Bit	64-bit								
Performance	Chip	Total CPU cores	15	18							
Performance	Chip	High-performance cores	5 × 4.61 GHz (Super cores); 10 × 4.38 GHz (Perf cores)	6 × 4.61 GHz (Super cores); 12 × 4.38 GHz (Perf cores)							
Performance	Chip	Energy-efficiency cores	—N/a								
Performance	Chip	Online configuration	18-core CPU	—N/a							
Performance	Chip	Graphics processor	Apple G17S			Apple G17C		Apple G17S		Apple G17C	
Performance	Chip	Total GPU cores	16	20		32	40	20		32	40
Performance	Chip	GPU family	Apple GPU Family 10								
Performance	Chip	Hardware-accelerated ray tracing	Yes								
Performance	Chip	Neural Accelerators in GPU	Yes								
Performance	Chip	Metal support	Metal 4								
Performance	Chip	Online configuration	20-core GPU (requires 18-core CPU)	—N/a		40-core GPU	—N/a			40-core GPU	—N/a
Performance	Chip	Neural Engine	16-core								
Performance	Chip	Media engine	Hardware-accelerated H.264, HEVC, ProRes and ProRes RAW; AV1 decode								
Performance	Chip	Apple Intelligence	Yes (currently not available in China mainland)								
Performance	Unified memory	Memory type	LPDDR5X-9600 (4800 MHz)								
Performance	Unified memory	Memory bus width	256-bit			384-bit	512-bit	256-bit		384-bit	512-bit
Performance	Unified memory	Memory bandwidth	307.2 GB/s			460.8 GB/s	614.4 GB/s	307.2 GB/s		460.8 GB/s	614.4 GB/s
Performance	Unified memory	Memory size	24 GB		48 GB	36 GB	48 GB	24 GB	48 GB	36 GB	48 GB
Performance	Unified memory	Online configuration	48 GB	48 GB; 64 GB	64 GB	—N/a	64 GB; 128 GB	48 GB; 64 GB	64 GB	—N/a	64 GB; 128 GB
Performance	Storage	Storage type	PCIe 5.0-based SSD								
Performance	Storage	Storage speed	Up to 14.5 GB/s read speed								
Performance	Storage	Storage size	1 TB			2 TB		1 TB		2 TB	
Performance	Storage	Online configuration	2 TB; 4 TB			4 TB; 8 TB; 16 TB		2 TB; 4 TB		4 TB; 8 TB; 16 TB	
Connector	HDMI		HDMI 2.1								
Connector	SDXC card slot		Yes								
Connector	USB-C/Thunderbolt		Three Thunderbolt 5 (USB-C) ports supporting charging and DisplayPort protocols among others								
Connector	Transmission speed		Up to 120 Gbit/s transmission speed (Thunderbolt 5 or USB4)								
Connector	External display support	Maximum display	3			4		3		4	
Connector	External display support	One external display	1 × 8K at 60 Hz (or 5K at 120 Hz or 4K at 240 Hz) (Thunderbolt or HDMI)								
Connector	External display support	Two external displays	1 × 5K at 120 Hz (or 4K at 200 Hz) + 1 × 8K at 60 Hz (or 5K at 120 Hz or 4K at 240 Hz) (Thunderbolt or HDMI)			2 × 8K at 60 Hz (or 5K at 120 Hz or 4K at 240 Hz) (Thunderbolt or HDMI)		1 × 5K at 120 Hz (or 4K at 200 Hz) + 1 × 8K at 60 Hz (or 5K at 120 Hz or 4K at 240 Hz) (Thunderbolt or HDMI)		2 × 8K at 60 Hz (or 5K at 120 Hz or 4K at 240 Hz) (Thunderbolt or HDMI)	
Connector	External display support	Three external displays	3 × 6K at 60 Hz (or 4K at 165 Hz) (Thunderbolt or HDMI)			2 × 6K at 60 Hz (or 4K at 165 Hz) + 1 × 8K at 60 Hz (or 5K at 120 Hz or 4K at 240 Hz) (Thunderbolt or HDMI)		3 × 6K at 60 Hz (or 4K at 165 Hz) (Thunderbolt or HDMI)		2 × 6K at 60 Hz (or 4K at 165 Hz) + 1 × 8K at 60 Hz (or 5K at 120 Hz or 4K at 240 Hz) (Thunderbolt or HDMI)	
Connector	External display support	Four external displays	—N/a			4 × 6K at 60 Hz (or 4K at 165 Hz) (Thunderbolt or HDMI)		—N/a		4 × 6K at 60 Hz (or 4K at 165 Hz) (Thunderbolt or HDMI)	
Connectivity	Wi-Fi		Wi-Fi 7 (802.11a/b/g/n/ac/ax/be)								
Connectivity	Bluetooth		Bluetooth 6								
Keyboard and trackpad	Type		Backlit Magic Keyboard with scissor-switch mechanism and ambient light sensor								
Keyboard and trackpad	Number of keys		78 (U.S.) or 79 (ISO)								
Keyboard and trackpad	Arrow keys		4 arrow keys in an inverted-T arrangement								
Keyboard and trackpad	Function keys		With full-height								
Keyboard and trackpad	Touch Bar		No								
Keyboard and trackpad	Trackpad		Force Touch trackpad								
Camera	Resolution		12 MP camera with 1080p FaceTime HD								
Camera	Advanced image signal processor with computational video		Yes								
Camera	Center Stage and Desk View		Yes								
Audio	Speakers		High-fidelity six-speakers								
Audio	Force-canceling woofers		Yes								
Audio	Wide stereo sound		Yes								
Audio	Dolby Atmos playback		Yes								
Audio	Dolby Atmos with built-in speakers		Yes								
Audio	Spatial Audio with dynamic head tracking		Yes								
Audio	Microphone		Studio-quality three-mic array with high signal-to-noise ratio and directional beamforming, including Voice Isolation and Wide Spectrum microphone modes								
Audio	3.5 mm jack		With advanced support for high-impedance headphones								
Audio	Audio output from HDMI		Yes								
Power	Battery		72.6 W·h					100 W·h			
Power	Power adapter		70 W USB-C; Charger is not included in Europe	96 W USB-C; 140 W USB-C GaN in Mainland China and Taiwan; Charger is not included in Europe				140 W USB-C GaN; Charger is not included in Europe			
Power	Optional configuration		70 W USB-C (Europe); 96 W USB-C	96 W USB-C (Europe)				140 W USB-C (Europe)			
Power	Charging method		MagSafe 3 or USB-C ports								
Power	Fast charge capability		96 W or 140 W USB-C through MagSafe 3 or USB-C ports					140 W USB-C through MagSafe 3 or USB-C ports with 240 W USB-C cable			

== Software and operating systems ==
The macOS operating system has been pre-installed on all Apple silicon MacBook Pro computers since release, starting with version macOS Big Sur, which is the first release of macOS that can run on Apple silicon Macs. Asahi Linux can also be installed but Windows cannot be booted on them.

Supported macOS releases
OS release	13-inch		14" and 16", Liquid Retina XDR							14" and 16", PROLED XDR
OS release	M1, 2020	M2, 2022	M1, 2021	M2, 2023	M3, Nov 2023	M4, 2024	M5	M5 Pro/M5 Max	M6	M5 Pro/M5 Max
11 Big Sur	Yes	—N/a	—N/a	—N/a	—N/a	—N/a	—N/a	—N/a	—N/a	—N/a
12 Monterey	Yes	Yes	Yes	—N/a	—N/a	—N/a	—N/a	—N/a	—N/a	—N/a
13 Ventura	Yes	Yes	Yes	Yes	13.5 (Note: MacBook Pro (14-inch, Nov 2023) with M3 ships with macOS Ventura 13.5. MacBook Pro (14-inch, Nov 2023) with M3 Pro/M3 Max and MacBook Pro (16-inch, Nov 2023) ships with macOS Sonoma 14.1.)	—N/a	—N/a	—N/a	—N/a	—N/a
14 Sonoma	Yes	Yes	Yes	Yes	14.1	—N/a	—N/a	—N/a	—N/a	—N/a
15 Sequoia	Yes	Yes	Yes	Yes	Yes	15.0/15.1 (Note: MacBook Pro (14-inch, 2024) with M4 ships with macOS Sequoia 15.0. MacBook Pro (14-inch, 2024) with M4 Pro/M4 Max and MacBook Pro (16-inch, 2024) ships with macOS Sequoia 15.1.)	—N/a	—N/a	—N/a	—N/a
26 Tahoe	Yes	Yes	Yes	Yes	Yes	Yes	Yes	26.3	—N/a	—N/a
27 Golden Gate	Yes	Yes	Yes	Yes	Yes	Yes	Yes	Yes	27.2	27.2

== See also ==
- 12-inch MacBook
- MacBook Air (Apple silicon)
- iMac (Apple silicon)
- Mac Studio
- Mac Pro

== Timeline ==
Timeline of portable Macintoshes
See also: List of Mac models
