= Hector Martin =

Hector Martin may refer to:

- Hector Martin (cyclist) (1898–1972), Belgian road-racing cyclist
- Hector Martin (hacker) (1990), Spanish hacker and security consultant
- Hektor Martin, a fictional character in the American TV series, Under the Dome
