= Alyssa Rosenzweig =

Canadian software developer (born 2001)

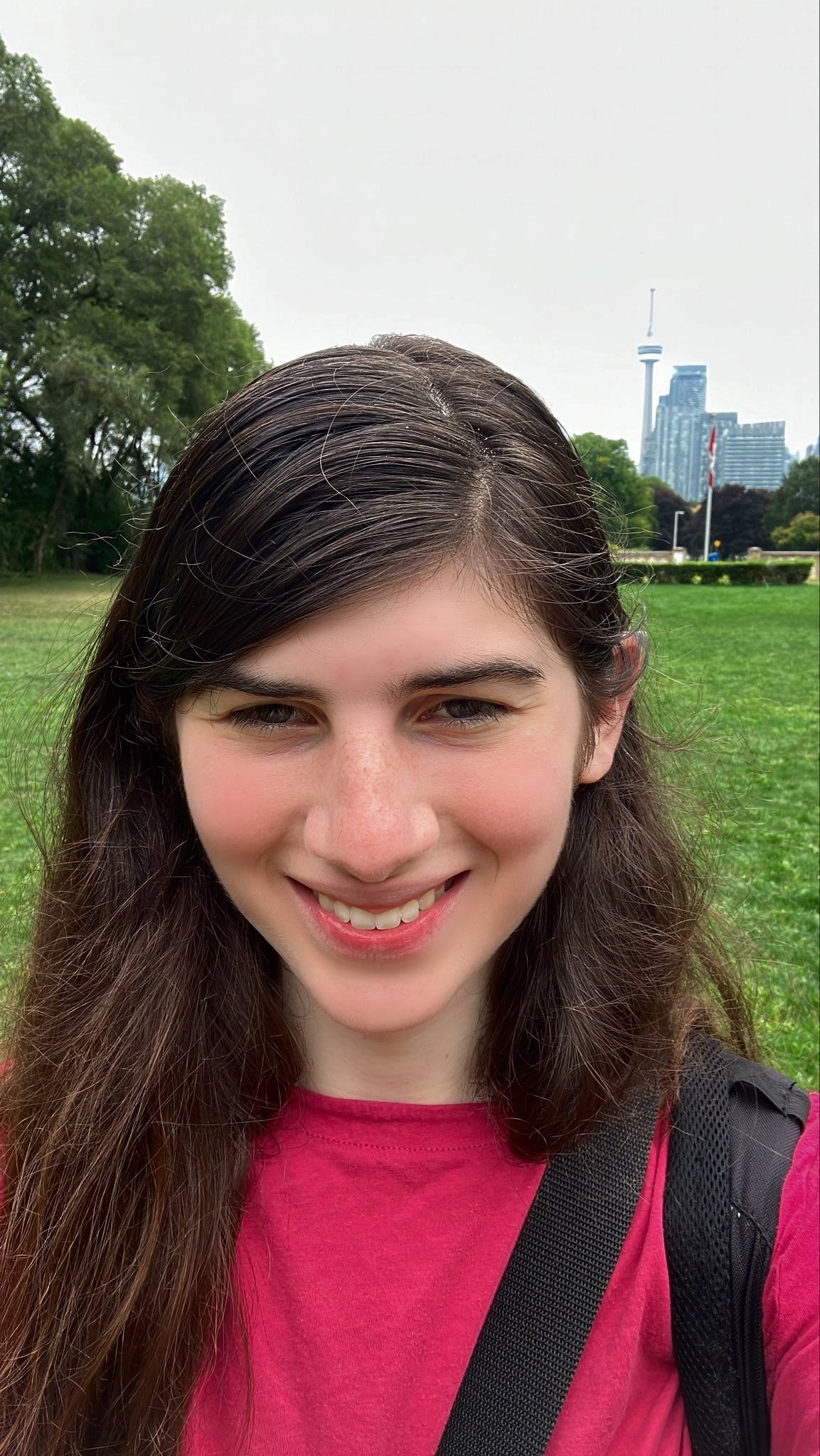
- Born: December 2001 (age 24)
- Education: Studied computer science, mathematics
- Alma mater: Dougherty Valley High School; Harvard Summer School; Center for Talented Youth; University of Toronto, Innis College
- Occupation: Software developer
- Known for: Asahi Linux GPU drivers
- Notable work: Panfrost
- Website: alyssarosenzweig.ca

Alyssa Rosenzweig is a Canadian software developer and software freedom activist known for her work on free software graphics drivers.

== Education ==
Per Rosenzweig's description of her childhood, she grew up in California and came out as transgender at age 10. She was raised Jewish and is now a Quaker.

Rosenzweig attended Dougherty Valley High School, with enrichment classes at Harvard Summer School and the Center for Talented Youth.

From 2019 through 2023, she studied computer science, mathematics, and religion at the University of Toronto as a Lester B. Pearson International Scholar, at Innis College.

== Career ==
As a software developer at Collabora, she led the Panfrost project, developing free OpenGL drivers for the Mali GPU to support accelerated graphics in upstream Mesa, shipping out-of-the-box on devices like the Pinebook Pro. She left Collabora on 10 April 2023. Since May 2023, she has worked with Valve Corporation as a contractor.

In September 2020, she wrote a Linux client for the COVID-19 contact tracing used in Canada.

As an Asahi Linux developer in 2021, she worked on reverse engineering the Apple GPU for the purpose of porting Linux to the Apple M1 processor to enable the development of a free software Gallium3D-based OpenGL driver targeting the "AGX" architecture found in the M1 GPU. In July 2021, Rosenzweig demonstrated Debian running bare metal on the Apple M1 with a mainline kernel.

In August 2025, she announced that she would step away from the Asahi Linux project after finishing and upstreaming the driver's OpenGL 4.6, OpenGL ES 3.2, OpenCL 3.0 and Vulkan 1.4 implementations. In the same announcement, she linked to the manual of Intel's Xe HPG architecture, calling it "[...] the next challenge".

== Awards ==
She is the recipient of the 2020 Award for Outstanding New Free Software Contributor and a Google Open Source Peer Bonus.
