= Hector Martin (hacker) =

Security consultant and hacker (born 1990)

- Born: Héctor Martín Cantero; 9 September 1990 (age 36)
- Occupations: Security consultant, hacker
- Years active: 2010–current
- Known for: Asahi Linux and game console hacking
- Website: marcan.st

Hector Martin Cantero (born September 9, 1990), also known as marcan, is a Spanish security hacker and former lead developer on the Asahi Linux project. He is also known for hacking multiple PlayStation generations, the Wii and other devices.

== Biography ==
=== Education ===
Martin went to the American School of Bilbao (Spain), where he received his primary and secondary education.

=== Career ===
Since 2011, he has been an official staff volunteer at Euskal Encounter, Gipuzkoa Encounter and Araba Encounter LAN parties. He is the coordinator of the Free Software area, where he organizes the "Hack It / Solve It" competition (a cybersecurity challenge known as capture the flag) and the "AI Contest" competition.

He has been part of fail0verflow, (formerly known as Team Twiizers) where he was responsible for reverse engineering and hacking the Wii. He was the first to write an open source driver for the Microsoft Kinect by reverse engineering for which he was widely credited. Sony sued him and others for hacking the PlayStation 3; the case was eventually settled out of court. In 2016, he ported Linux to the PlayStation 4 and demonstrated that at the 33rd Chaos Communication Congress by running Steam inside Linux. He wrote the usbmuxd tool for synchronizing data from iPhones to Linux computers.

In 2021, Martin founded the Asahi Linux project, an effort to port Linux to the new Apple silicon-powered Macs. While reverse engineering Apple's hardware, Martin discovered the "M1racles" security vulnerability on the Apple M1 processor. On 7 February 2025, Martin stepped down from directly working on the Linux kernel over a dispute regarding Rust for Linux. On 14 February 2025, Martin resigned as lead developer of Asahi Linux.
