= Rust for Linux =

Project for adding Rust language to Linux kernel

- The mascot of Linux, Tux, superimposed over Rust's logo
- Developers: Community contributors; Miguel Ojeda
- Initial release: October 1, 2022; 3 years ago
- Written in: Rust
- Operating system: Linux
- Available in: English
- License: GPL-2.0-only with Linux-syscall-note.
- Website: https://rust-for-linux.com/
- Repository: github.com/Rust-for-Linux/linux

Rust for Linux is an ongoing project started in 2020 to add Rust as a programming language that can be used within the Linux kernel software, which has been written using C and assembly only. This project aims to leverage Rust's memory safety to reduce bugs when writing kernel drivers. Progress has been slower than hoped by both Rust advocates and Linus Torvalds, lead of the Linux kernel project. In December 2023, the first drivers written in Rust were accepted, and released in kernel version 6.8. In December 2025, it was announced that Rust in the Linux kernel is no longer experimental with Rust development becoming an official part of kernel development.

== History ==
The Linux kernel has been primarily written in C and assembly languages since its first release in 1991. Around 1997, the addition of C++ was considered and experimented upon for two weeks before being scrapped. Rust was created in 2006 and combines the performance of low-level programming languages (such as C) with a focus on memory safety and a user-friendly tool set and syntax.

An example Linux external loadable kernel module created using the Rust language was published by Taesoo Kim in 2013.

The Rust for Linux project was announced in 2020 in the Linux kernel mailing list with goal of adding Rust as a programming language that could be used within the Linux project. At the Open Source Summit 2022, Linus Torvalds stated that the incorporation of the project's work could begin as soon as the Linux 5.20 release, later named as Linux 6.0. The first release candidate for Linux 6.0 was created on 14 August 2022, without Rust support. In the release notes for Linux 6.0-rc1, Torvalds expressed his intention for adding Rust support, "I actually was hoping that we'd get some of the first rust infrastructure, and the multi-gen LRU VM, but neither of them happened this time around." On 19 September 2022, an article from ZDNet revealed an email from Linus Torvalds stating that "Unless something odd happens, it [Rust] will make it into 6.1".

In October 2022, a pull request for accepting the implementation for Rust for Linux was approved by Torvalds. As of Linux 6.1, support was intentionally left minimal in order to allow developers to test the feature.

Rust for Linux developers created a new library "pinned-init" to safely and fallibly initialize memory that must not be relocated. It was first included in Linux 6.4, and been improved in later versions.

Linux 6.10 included RISC-V processor architecture support for Rust.

In July 2024 a change was accepted into Linux to support multiple Rust versions for the first time, allowing compiling using both 1.78 (Released 2 May, 2024) and 1.79 (Released 13 June, 2024).

As of August 2024, Rust for Linux depends on unstable features of the Rust compiler.

In December 2025, during the Linux Kernel Developers Summit, it was decided to promote Rust from experimental to a core part of the kernel. This expands the core languages in the Linux kernel to C, assembly and Rust.

== Usage ==
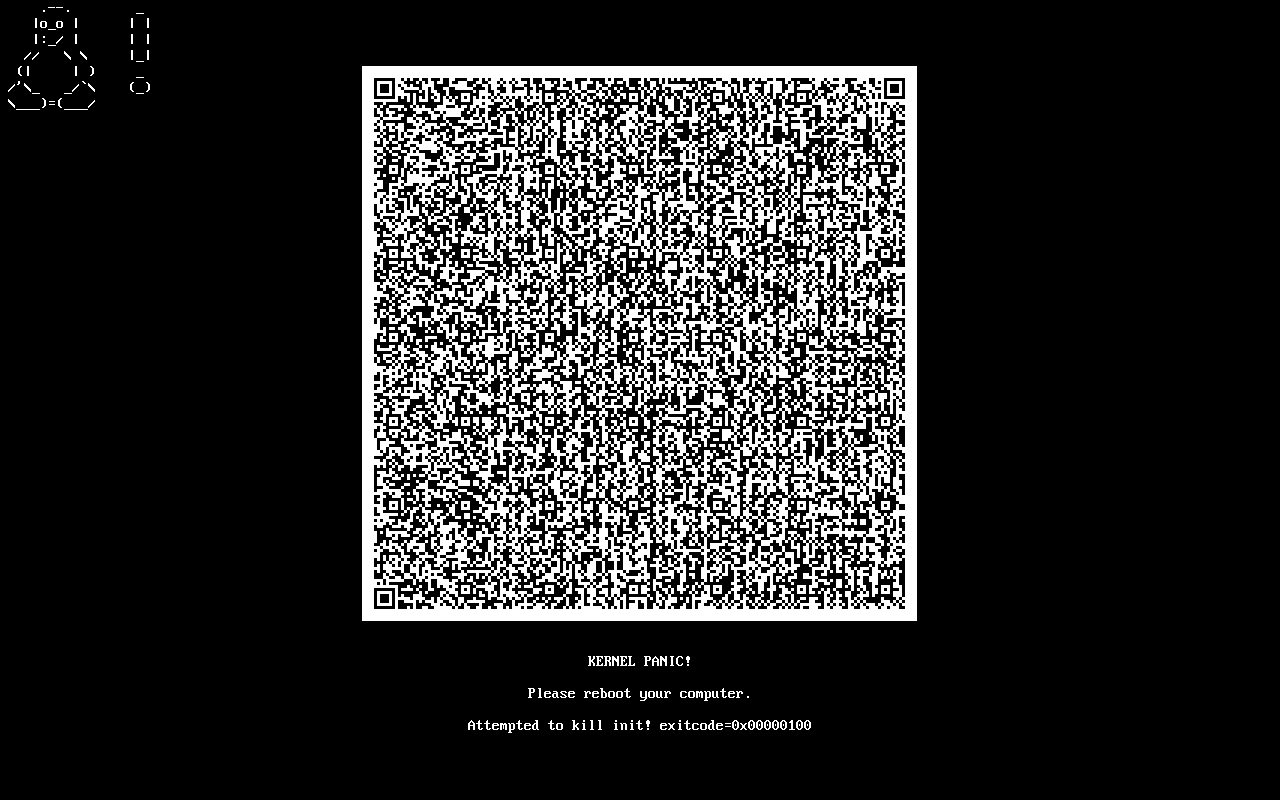
DRM kernel panic with QR code, example of a Linux kernel feature implemented with Rust

Linux kernel contains the following Rust components:

- Android Binder IPC driver
- rnull, a drop-in replacement for the null device
- ASIX AX88772A and Realtek Generic FE-GE physical layer network drivers
- Direct rendering manager kernel panic handler, which displays a QR code

Other notable projects using Rust in Linux include:

- tarfs, a tar filesystem
- NVM Express (NVMe) device driver
- Asahi Linux's Apple silicon AGX GPU DRM driver
- PuzzleFS, a container filesystem
- Read-only ext2 filesystem
- Nova, intended to create a Rust nouveau Nvidia GPU driver, is being developed on the freedesktop.org project infrastructure

== See also ==
- LynxOS
- RedoxOS
