= Apple M3 =

System-on-a-chip designed by Apple Inc.

Apple M3 series
General information
- Launched: M3, M3 Pro and Max: October 30, 2023; 3 years ago; M3 Ultra: March 12, 2025; 20 months ago
- Discontinued: M3 Pro and Max: October 30, 2024; 2 years ago M3: March 4, 2026; 8 months ago M3 Ultra: August 25, 2026; 2 months ago
- Marketed by: Apple Inc.
- Designed by: Apple Inc.
- Common manufacturer: TSMC

Performance
- Max. CPU clock rate: 4.05 GHz (performance cores) 2.75 GHz (efficiency cores)

Physical specifications
- Transistors: 25–184 billion
- Cores: M3; 8 (4 P-Cores + 4 E-Cores); M3 Pro; 11 or 12 (5 or 6 P-Cores + 6 E-Cores); M3 Max; 14 or 16 (10 or 12 P-Cores + 4 E-Cores); M3 Ultra; 28 or 32 (20 or 24 P-Cores + 8 E-Cores)
- Memory (RAM): LPDDR5-6400 memory (8–512 GB)
- GPUs: Apple-designed integrated graphics; M3; 8, 9 or 10 cores; M3 Pro; 14 or 18 cores; M3 Max; 30 or 40 core; M3 Ultra; 60 or 80 cores
- Co-processor: NPU: 18 TOPS

Cache
- L1 cache: Performance cores 192+128 KiB per core Efficiency cores 128+64 KiB per core
- L2 cache: Performance cores M3 and M3 Pro: 16 MiB; M3 Max: 32 MiB; M3 Ultra: 64 MiB; Efficiency cores M3, M3 Pro, M3 Max, M3 Ultra: 4 MiB

Architecture and classification
- Application: Desktop (iMac, Mac Studio), notebook (MacBook Air, MacBook Pro) and tablet (iPad Air)
- Technology node: 3 nm (N3B)
- Microarchitecture: Ibiza/Lobos/Palma
- Instruction set: ARMv8.6-A

Products, models, variants
- Variant: M3 M3 Pro M3 Max M3 Ultra Apple A17 Pro

History
- Predecessor: Apple M2
- Successor: Apple M4

The Apple M3 is a series of ARM-based system on a chip (SoC) designed by Apple, part of the Apple silicon series, as a central processing unit (CPU) and graphics processing unit (GPU) for its Mac desktops and notebooks and the iPad Air tablets. Released in late 2023, it is the third generation of ARM architecture intended for Apple's Mac computers after switching from Intel Core to Apple silicon, succeeding the Apple M2. The M3, M3 Pro and M3 Max were introduced on October 30, 2023, and were followed by a workstation ship, the M3 Ultra, in March 2025.

== Release ==
Apple announced the M3 chip family on October 30, 2023, at its Halloween-themed Scary Fast online event, along with models of the iMac and the MacBook Pro using the M3 chips. The M3 Macbook Pro introduced a new “Space Black” finish, the first new color for the Pro line since 2015.

== Design ==
Apple M series comparison
Chip	CPU cores			GPU cores	RAM options (GB)	Displays	Memory bandwidth (GB/s)	Introduced
Chip	S	P	E	GPU cores	RAM options (GB)	Displays	Memory bandwidth (GB/s)	Introduced
M1	—N/a	4	4	8	8/16	2	68	2020
M2	—N/a	4	4	10	8/16/24	2	102	2022
M3	—N/a	4	4	10	8/16/24	2	102	2023
M4	—N/a	4	6	10	16/24/32	3	120	2024
M5	4	—N/a	6	10	16/24/32	3	153	2025
M6	2	4	6	12	16	3	153	2026
M6	2	4	6	12	24/32	3	170	2026

The M3 series is Apple's first 3 nm design for desktops and notebooks. It is manufactured by TSMC.

=== CPU ===
- M3: 8-core CPU with 4 performance cores and 4 efficiency cores
- M3 Pro: 11- or 12-core CPU with 5 or 6 performance cores and 6 efficiency cores
- M3 Max: 14- or 16-core CPU with 10 or 12 performance cores and 4 efficiency cores
- M3 Ultra: 28- or 32-core CPU with 20 or 24 performance core and 8 efficiency cores

=== GPU ===
The redesigned GPU includes features like Dynamic Caching, Mesh Shading, and hardware-accelerated ray tracing.

The Dynamic Caching technology allocates local memory in real time. Unlike conventional approaches, Dynamic Caching ensures that only the precise amount of memory required for a task is used, thereby optimizing memory usage and potentially enhancing performance and efficiency. This is particularly beneficial for graphics-intensive tasks, where dynamic memory allocation can be critical.

Supported codecs on the M3 include 8K H.264, 8K H.265 (8/10bit, up to 4:4:4), 8K Apple ProRes, VP9, JPEG and AV1 decoding.

=== NPU ===
The M3 contains dedicated neural network hardware in a 16-core Neural Engine capable of executing over 18 trillion operations per second, which is faster than the A16 Bionic's 17 trillion operations per second NPU seen in the iPhone 14 Pro series.

==== AI ====
Apple specifically targeted AI development and workloads, both with the Neural Engine and with the increased maximum memory (128 GiB) of the M3 Max, allowing AI models with high numbers of parameters. Apple claims a 15% performance improvement for AI workloads on the M3 (compared to the previous generation M2).

=== Memory ===
The M3's Unified Memory Architecture (UMA) is similar to the M2 generation; M3 SoCs use 6,400 MT/s LPDDR5 SDRAM. As with prior M series SoCs, this serves as both RAM and video RAM. The M3 has 8 memory controllers, the M3 Pro has 12 and the M3 Max has 32. Each controller is 16-bits wide and is capable of accessing up to 4 GiB of memory.

The M3 Pro and 14-core M3 Max have lower memory bandwidth than the M1/M2 Pro and M1/M2 Max respectively. The M3 Pro has a 192-bit memory bus where the M1 and M2 Pro had a 256-bit bus, resulting in only 150 GB/sec bandwidth versus 200 GB/sec for its predecessors. The 14-core M3 Max only enables 24 out of the 32 controllers, therefore it has 300 GB/sec vs. the 400 GB/sec for all models of the M1 and M2 Max, while the 16-core M3 Max has the same 400 GB/sec as the prior M1 and M2 Max models.

=== Other features ===
Other components include an image signal processor (ISP), a NVM Express storage controller, a Secure Enclave, and a USB4 controller that includes Thunderbolt 4 or Thunderbolt 5 support.

== Products that use the Apple M3 series ==
=== M3 ===
- MacBook Pro (14-inch, Nov 2023) – 10-core GPU
- MacBook Air (13-inch and 15-inch, Mar 2024) – 8 and 10-core GPU
- iMac (24-inch, 2023) – 10-core GPU
- iPad Air (M3, 2025) – 9 core GPU

=== M3 Pro ===
- MacBook Pro (14-inch and 16-inch, Nov 2023) – 14- and 18-core GPU

=== M3 Max ===
- MacBook Pro (14-inch and 16-inch, Nov 2023) – 30- and 40-core GPU

=== M3 Ultra ===
- Mac Studio (2025) – 60- and 80-core GPU

== Variants ==
The table below shows the various SoCs.

Variant	CPU		GPU			NPU		LPDDR5-6400 memory			Transistor count	TDP (W)	Used in
Variant	P-cores (Note: Performance cores.)	E-cores (Note: Efficiency cores.)	Cores (Note: Each GPU core has 16 execution units (EUs) and 128 arithmetic logic units (ALUs).)	EU	ALU	Cores	Performance	Controllers (Note: Each LPDDR5-6400 memory controller contains a 16-bit memory channel and can access up to 8 GiB of memory.)	Bandwidth	Max capacity	Transistor count	TDP (W)	Used in
A17 Pro	2	4	6	96	768	16	35 TOPS	4	51.2 GB/s	8 GB	19 billion	8	iPhone 15 Pro / Pro Max
A17 Pro	2	4	5	80	640	16	35 TOPS	4	51.2 GB/s	8 GB	19 billion	8	iPad Mini (A17 Pro)
M3	4	4	8	128	1024	16	18 TOPS	8	102.4 GB/s	24 GB	25 billion	20	MacBook Air M3
M3	4	4	9	144	1152	16	18 TOPS	8	102.4 GB/s	24 GB	25 billion	20	iPad Air M3
M3	4	4	10	160	1280	16	18 TOPS	8	102.4 GB/s	24 GB	25 billion	20	MacBook Air M3 / MacBook Pro M3
M3 Pro	5	6	14	224	1792	16	18 TOPS	12	153.6 GB/s	36 GB	37 billion	27	MacBook Pro M3 Pro / M3 Max
M3 Pro	6	6	18	288	2304	16	18 TOPS	12	153.6 GB/s	36 GB	37 billion	27	MacBook Pro M3 Pro / M3 Max
M3 Max	10	4	30	480	3840	16	18 TOPS	24	307.2 GB/s	96 GB	92 billion	78	MacBook Pro M3 Pro / M3 Max
M3 Max	12	4	40	640	5120	16	18 TOPS	32	409.6 GB/s	128 GB	92 billion	78	MacBook Pro M3 Pro / M3 Max
M3 Ultra	20	8	60	960	7680	32	36 TOPS	64	819.2 GB/s	256 GB	184 billion	140	Mac Studio M3 Ultra
M3 Ultra	24	8	80	1280	10240	32	36 TOPS	64	819.2 GB/s	512 GB	184 billion	140	Mac Studio M3 Ultra

== See also ==
- Apple silicon
- GoFetch – security vulnerability within the Apple M3 first disclosed in 2024
