= Apple M2 =

System-on-a-chip designed by Apple

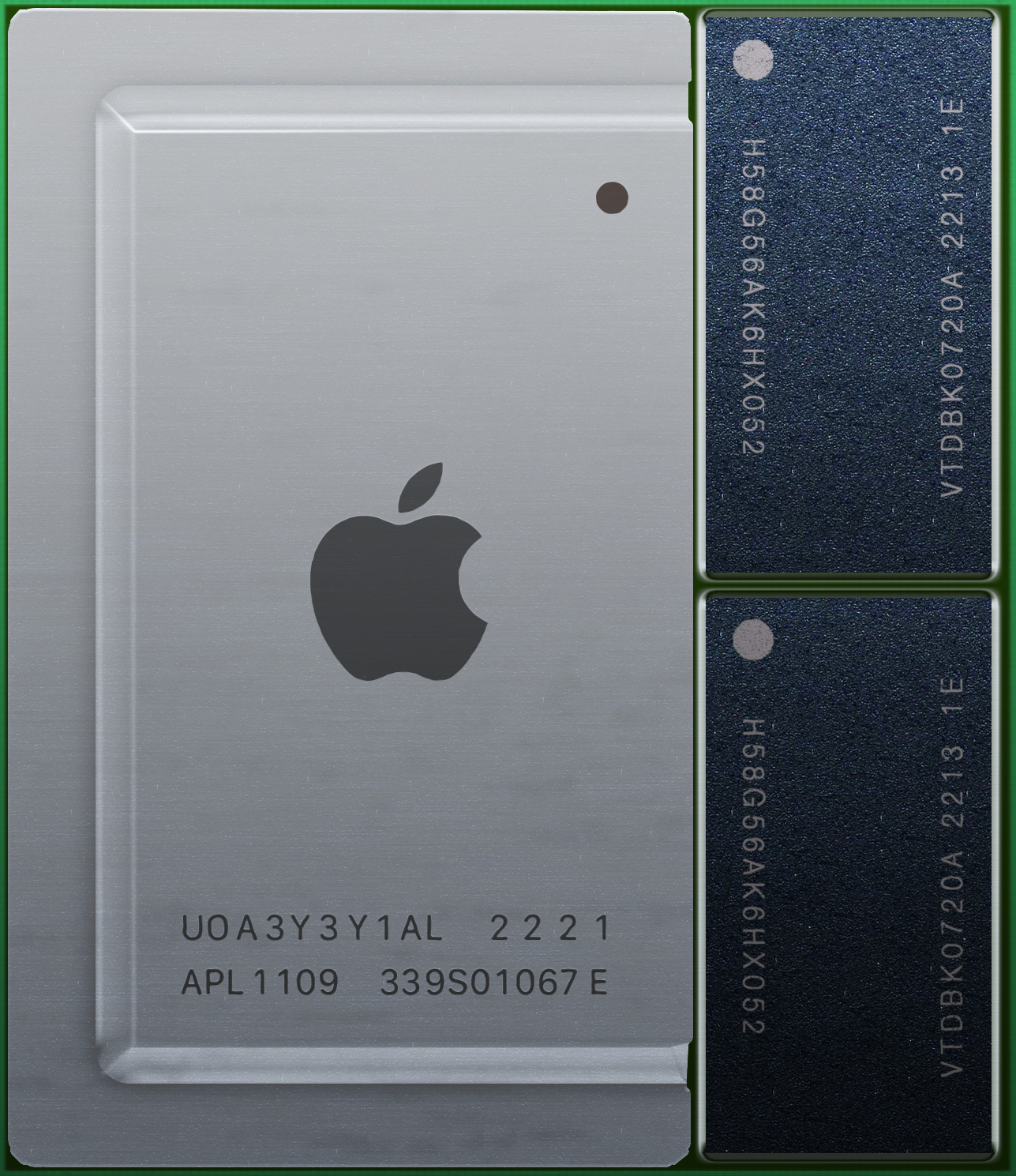

General information
- Launched: June 24, 2022; 4 years ago
- Discontinued: March 26, 2026; 6 months ago
- Designed by: Apple
- Common manufacturer: TSMC

Performance
- Max. CPU clock rate: 3.49 GHz

Physical specifications
- Transistors: 20–134 billion
- Cores: 8–24 (4–16 high-performance + 4–8 high-efficiency)
- Memory (RAM): 6400 MT/s LPDDR5 memory (up to 192 GB)
- GPU: Apple-designed integrated graphics (8–76 core)
- Co-processor: NPU: 16 TOPS

Cache
- L1 cache: Performance cores: 192+128 KB per core Efficiency cores: 128+64 KB per core
- L2 cache: Performance cores: 16–64 MB; Efficiency cores: 4–8 MB
- Last level cache: M2: 8 MB M2 Pro: 24 MB; M2 Max: 48 MB M2 Ultra: 96 MB

Architecture and classification
- Application: Notebook (MacBook family), tablet (iPad Pro and iPad Air), desktop (Mac Mini, Mac Studio, Mac Pro), mixed reality headset (Vision Pro)
- Technology node: 5 nm (N5P)
- Microarchitecture: "Avalanche" and "Blizzard"
- Instruction set: ARMv8.6-A

Products, models, variants
- Variant: M2; M2 Pro; M2 Max; M2 Ultra; Apple A15

History
- Predecessor: Apple M1
- Successor: Apple M3

The Apple M2 is a series of ARM-based system on a chip (SoC) designed by Apple, launched in 2022. It is part of the Apple silicon series, as a central processing unit (CPU) and graphics processing unit (GPU) for its Mac desktops and notebooks, the iPad Pro and iPad Air tablets, and the Vision Pro mixed reality headset. It is the second generation of ARM architecture intended for Apple's Mac computers after switching from Intel Core to Apple silicon, succeeding the M1. Apple announced the M2 on June 6, 2022, at Worldwide Developers Conference (WWDC), along with models of the MacBook Air and the 13-inch MacBook Pro using the M2. The M2 is made with TSMC's "Enhanced 5-nanometer technology" N5P process and contains 20 billion transistors, a 25% increase from the M1. Apple claims CPU improvements up to 18% and GPU improvements up to 35% compared to the M1.

The M2 was followed by the professional-focused M2 Pro and M2 Max chips in January 2023. The M2 Max is a higher-powered version of the M2 Pro, with more GPU cores and memory bandwidth, and a larger die size. In June 2023, Apple introduced the M2 Ultra, a desktop workstation chip containing two M2 Max units. Its successor, Apple M3, was announced on October 30, 2023.

== Design ==
Apple M series comparison
Chip	CPU cores			GPU cores	RAM options (GB)	Displays	Memory bandwidth (GB/s)	Introduced
Chip	S	P	E	GPU cores	RAM options (GB)	Displays	Memory bandwidth (GB/s)	Introduced
M1	—N/a	4	4	8	8/16	2	68	2020
M2	—N/a	4	4	10	8/16/24	2	102	2022
M3	—N/a	4	4	10	8/16/24	2	102	2023
M4	—N/a	4	6	10	16/24/32	3	120	2024
M5	4	—N/a	6	10	16/24/32	3	153	2025
M6	2	4	6	12	16	3	153	2026
M6	2	4	6	12	24/32	3	170	2026

=== CPU ===
The M2 has four high-performance @3.49 GHz "Avalanche" and four energy-efficient @2.42 GHz "Blizzard" cores, first seen in the A15 Bionic, providing a hybrid configuration similar to ARM DynamIQ, as well as Intel's Alder Lake and Raptor Lake processors. The high-performance cores have 192 KB of L1 instruction cache and 128 KB of L1 data cache and share a 16 MB L2 cache; the energy-efficient cores have a 128 KB L1 instruction cache, 64 KB L1 data cache, and a shared 4 MB L2 cache. It also has an 8 MB system level cache shared by the GPU.

The M2 Pro has 8 performance cores and 4 efficiency cores in the unbinned model, or 6 performance cores and 4 efficiency cores in the binned model. The M2 Max has 8 performance cores and 4 efficiency cores in both the binned and unbinned SKUs, and operates at a slightly higher 3.7GHz clock speed in some models.

=== GPU ===
The M2 integrates an Apple designed ten-core (eight in some base models, nine in the M2 iPad Air) graphics processing unit (GPU). Each GPU core is split into 16 execution units, which each contain eight arithmetic logic units (ALUs). In total, the M2 GPU contains up to 160 execution units or 1280 ALUs, which have a maximum floating point (FP32) performance of 3.6 TFLOPs.

The M2 Pro integrates a 19-core (16 in some base models) GPU, while the M2 Max integrates a 38-core (30 in some base models) GPU. In total, the M2 Max GPU contains up to 608 execution units or 4864 ALUs, which have a maximum floating point (FP32) performance of 13.6 TFLOPS.

The M2 Ultra features a 60- or 76-core GPU with up to 9728 ALUs and 27.2 TFLOPS of FP32 performance.

=== Memory ===
The M2 uses 6,400 MT/s LPDDR5 SDRAM in a unified memory configuration shared by all the components of the processor. The SoC and RAM chips are mounted together in a system-in-a-package design. 8 GB, 16 GB and 24 GB configurations are available. It has a 128-bit memory bus with 100 GB/s bandwidth, and the M2 Pro, M2 Max, and M2 Ultra have approximately 200 GB/s, 400 GB/s, and 800 GB/s respectively.

=== Other features ===
The M2 contains dedicated neural network hardware in a 16-core Neural Engine capable of executing 15.8 trillion operations per second. Other components include an image signal processor, a NVM Express storage controller, a Secure Enclave, and a USB4 controller that includes Thunderbolt 3 (Thunderbolt 4 on Mac mini) support. The M2 Pro, Max and Ultra support Thunderbolt 4.

Supported codecs on the M2 include 8K H.264, 8K H.265 (8/10bit, up to 4:4:4), 8K Apple ProRes, VP9, and JPEG.

== Products that use the Apple M2 series ==
=== M2 ===
- MacBook Air (13-inch, M2, 2022) (8 or 10 core GPU)
- MacBook Air (15-inch, M2, 2023) (10 core GPU)
- MacBook Pro (13-inch, M2, 2022) (10 core GPU)
- iPad Pro (11-inch, 6th generation) (2022) (10 core GPU)
- iPad Pro (12.9-inch, 6th generation) (2022) (10 core GPU)
- Mac Mini (2023) (10 core GPU)
- Vision Pro (2024) (10 core GPU)
- iPad Air (M2) (2024) (9 core GPU)

=== M2 Pro ===
- MacBook Pro (14-inch and 16-inch, 2023)
- Mac Mini (2023)

=== M2 Max ===
- MacBook Pro (14-inch and 16-inch, 2023)
- Mac Studio (2023)

=== M2 Ultra ===
- Mac Studio (2023)
- Mac Pro (2023)

== Variants ==
The table below shows the various SoCs based on the "Avalanche" and "Blizzard" microarchitectures.

Variant	CPU cores		GPU			Neural Engine (NPU)		LPDDR5-6400 memory		Transistor count	Used in
Variant	P (Note: Performance Cores)	E (Note: Efficiency cores)	Cores (Note: Each GPU core has 16 execution units (EUs) and 128 arithmetic logic units (ALUs))	EU	ALU	Cores	Performance	Size (GB) (Note: Each LPDDR5-6400 memory controller contains a 16-bit memory channel and can access up to 4GiB of memory.)	Bandwidth	Transistor count	Used in
A15 Bionic	2	3	5	80	640	16	15.8 TOPS	4	34.1 GB/s	15 billion	Apple TV 4K (3rd generation)
A15 Bionic	2	4	4	64	512	16	15.8 TOPS	4	34.1 GB/s	15 billion	iPhone SE (3rd generation) / iPhone 13 mini / iPhone 13
A15 Bionic	2	4	5	80	640	16	15.8 TOPS	6	34.1 GB/s	15 billion	iPhone 13 Pro / 13 Pro Max / 14 / 14 Plus iPad mini (6th generation)
M2	4	4	8	128	1024	16	15.8 TOPS	8–24	102.4 GB/s	20 billion	MacBook Air (13-inch, M2, 2022)
M2	4	4	9	144	1152	16	15.8 TOPS	8–24	102.4 GB/s	20 billion	iPad Air (M2)
M2	4	4	10	160	1280	16	15.8 TOPS	8–24	102.4 GB/s	20 billion	MacBook Air (13-inch, M2, 2022 / 15-inch, M2, 2023); MacBook Pro (13-inch, M2, 2022); Mac Mini (2023) iPad Pro (11-inch, 4th gen) / (12.9-inch, 6th gen); Vision Pro (2024)
M2 Pro	6	4	16	256	2048	16	15.8 TOPS	16–32	204.8 GB/s	40 billion	Mac Mini (2023); MacBook Pro (14-inch and 16-inch, 2023)
M2 Pro	8	4	16	256	2048	16	15.8 TOPS	16–32	204.8 GB/s	40 billion	Mac Mini (2023); MacBook Pro (14-inch and 16-inch, 2023)
M2 Pro	8	4	19	304	2432	16	15.8 TOPS	16–32	204.8 GB/s	40 billion	Mac Mini (2023); MacBook Pro (14-inch and 16-inch, 2023)
M2 Max	8	4	30	480	3840	16	15.8 TOPS	32–96	409.6 GB/s	67 billion	MacBook Pro (14-inch and 16-inch, 2023); Mac Studio (2023)
M2 Max	8	4	38	608	4864	16	15.8 TOPS	32–96	409.6 GB/s	67 billion	MacBook Pro (14-inch and 16-inch, 2023); Mac Studio (2023)
M2 Ultra	16	8	60	960	7680	32	31.6 TOPS	64–192	819.2 GB/s	134 billion	Mac Studio (2023); Mac Pro (2023)
M2 Ultra	16	8	76	1216	9728	32	31.6 TOPS	64–192	819.2 GB/s	134 billion	Mac Studio (2023); Mac Pro (2023)

== See also ==
- Apple silicon
- Apple A15
- GoFetch – security vulnerability within the Apple M2 first disclosed in 2024
- Rosetta 2
- Universal 2 binary
- List of Mac models grouped by CPU type
- Snapdragon XR
