= Touch ID =

Electronic fingerprint recognition feature by Apple

- Developer: Apple Inc.
- Release: November 20, 2013; 12 years ago
- Operating system: iPhone: iOS 7 and later; iPad: iOS 8.1 and later; MacBook: macOS Sierra and later; iMac: macOS Monterey and later; Magic Keyboard: N/A
- Successor: Face ID
- Type: Biometric identification
- License: Proprietary license
- Website: Use Touch ID on iPhone and iPad

Logo used by Apple

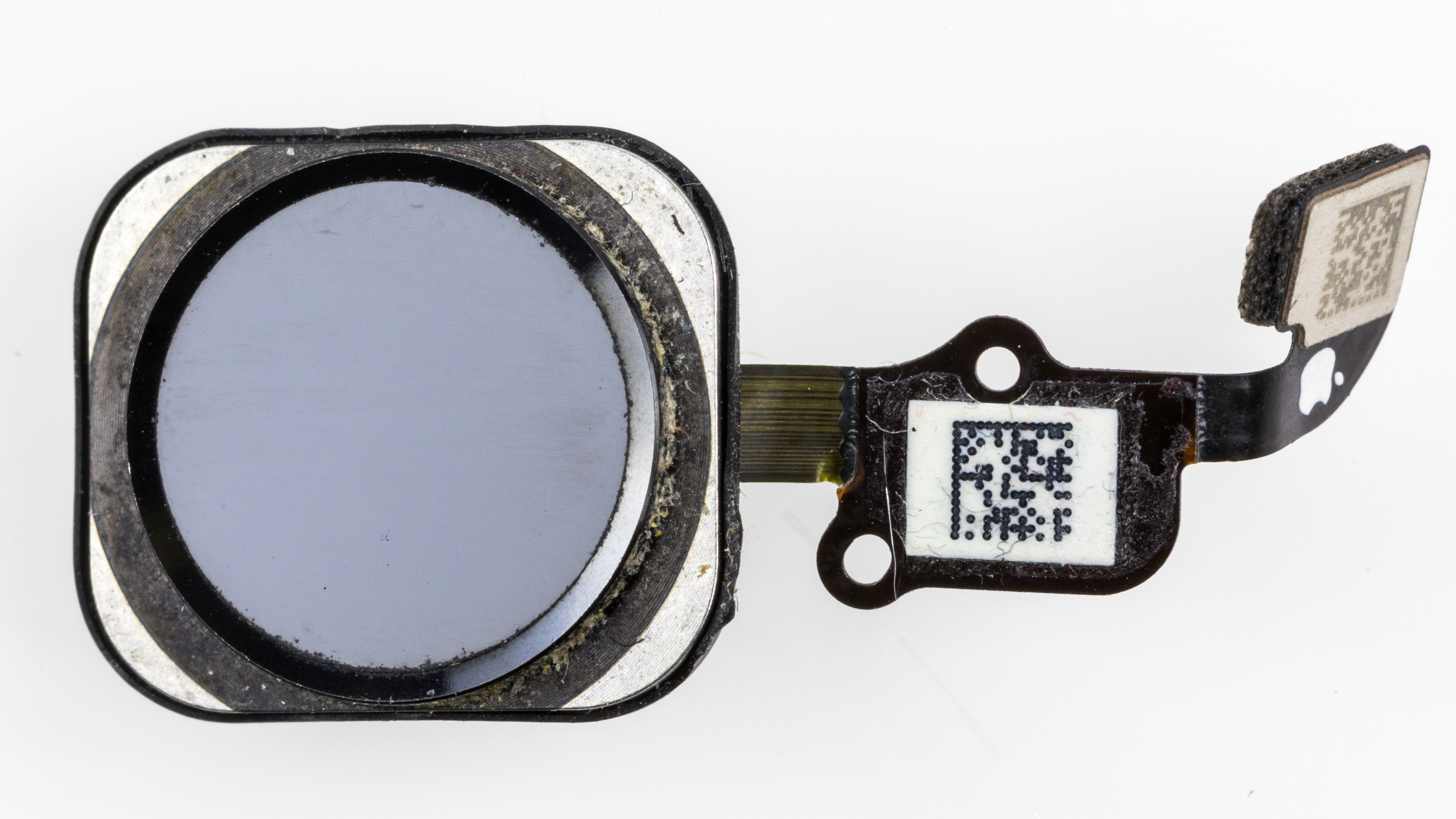
Touch ID module of an iPhone 6s

Touch ID is an electronic fingerprint recognition feature designed and released by Apple Inc. that allows users to unlock devices, make purchases in the various Apple digital media stores (App Store, iTunes Store, and Apple Books Store), and authenticate Apple Pay online or in apps. It can also be used to lock and unlock password-protected notes on iPhone and iPad. Touch ID was first introduced in iPhones with the iPhone 5s in 2013. In 2015, Apple introduced a faster second-generation Touch ID in the iPhone 6s; a year later in 2016, it made its laptop debut in the MacBook Pro integrated on the right side of the Touch Bar. Touch ID has also been used on iPads since the iPad Air 2 was introduced in 2014. In MacBooks, each user account can have up to three fingerprints, and a total of five fingerprints across the system. Fingerprint information is stored locally in a secure enclave on the Apple A7 and later chips, not in the cloud, a design choice intended to secure fingerprint information from users or malicious attackers.

Touch ID is still used in MacBooks, Magic Keyboard, all iPad Air models, and the iPhone Duo.

== History ==
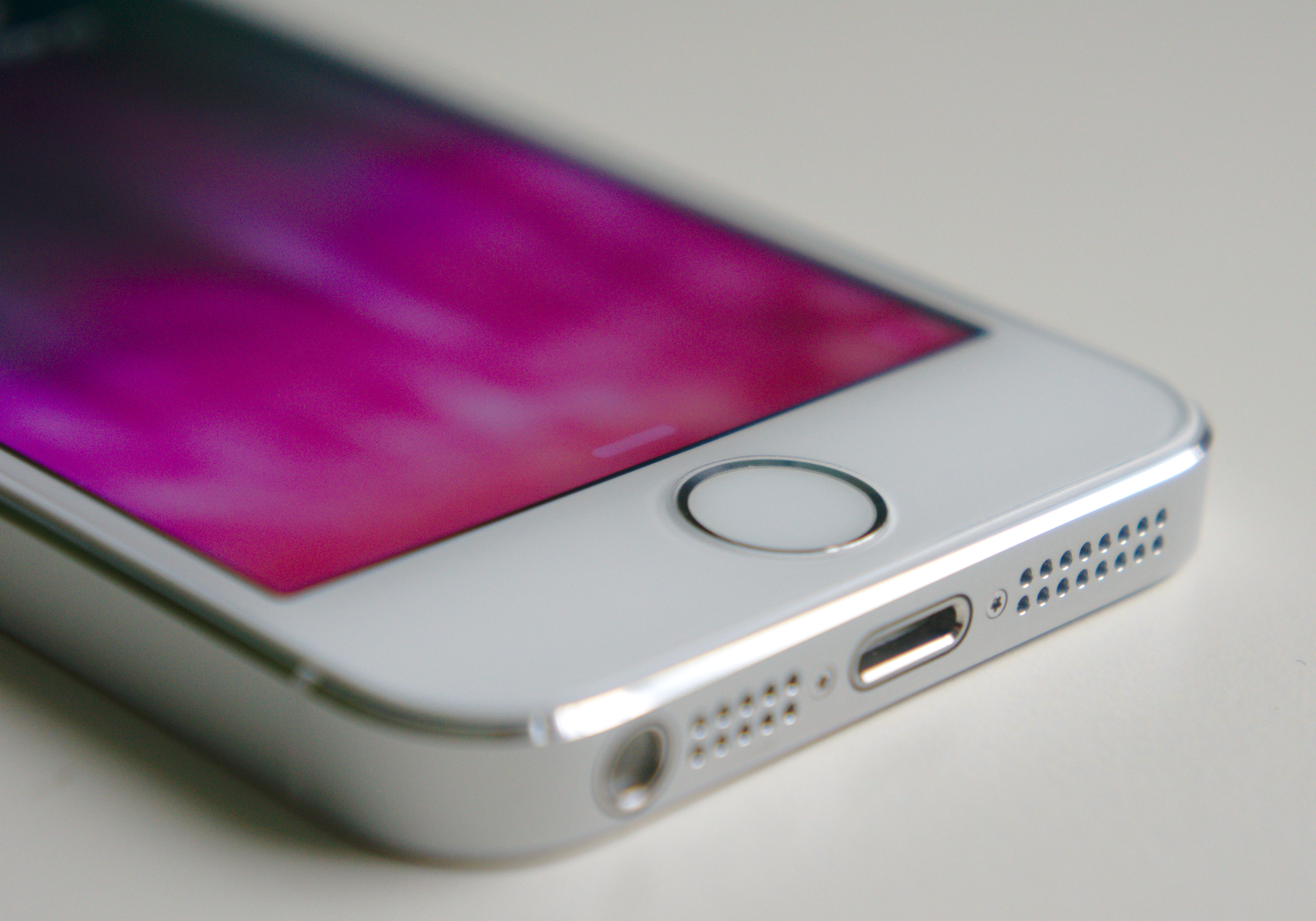
The iPhone 5s (pictured) was the first model with a Touch ID sensor integrated with its home button.

In 2012, Apple acquired AuthenTec, a company focused on fingerprint-reading and identification management software, for $356 million. The acquisition led commentators to expect a fingerprint reading feature.

Following leaks and speculation in early September the next year, the iPhone 5s was unveiled on September 10, 2013, and was the first phone on a major US carrier to feature the technology. Apple's Vice President of Marketing, Phil Schiller, announced the feature at Apple's iPhone media event and spent several minutes (the major portion of the conference) discussing the feature.

Wells Fargo analyst Maynard Um predicted on September 4, 2013, that a fingerprint sensor in the iPhone 5s would help mobile commerce and boost adoption in the corporate environment. "As consumers increasingly rely on mobile devices to transact and store personal data, a reliable device-side authentication solution may become a necessity," Um said.

With the unveiling of the iPhone 6 and 6 Plus at a keynote event on September 9, 2014, Touch ID was expanded from being used to unlock the device and authenticating App Store purchases to also authenticating Apple Pay.

The iPhone 6s incorporates a second-generation Touch ID sensor that is up to twice as fast as the first-generation sensor found in the 5s, 6, and SE (1st generation) phones. The new Touch ID unlocks almost instantly and posed an issue as it unlocks too fast to read notifications on the lock screen. This is remedied with the iOS 10 update in which a user must press the home button to have the home screen appear. It, however, can be changed in iOS settings so that users can go directly to the home screen after resting their finger on the sensor, similar to previous versions of iOS. Solely placing a finger on the sensor will only unlock the iPhone unless said setting is enabled, and no notifications are currently being displayed on the lock screen.

Touch ID was retained on iPhone 8, iPhone SE (2nd generation and later) and the base model iPads, while all other iPhones since the iPhone X in 2017, and the higher-end iPad Pro have adopted Face ID recognition. Several iPads that do not have Face ID feature a new sleep/wake button with an integrated Touch ID sensor. The iPhone Duo features a new side button with an integrated Touch ID.

In 2021, Apple unveiled a new Magic Keyboard with optional Touch ID for the iMac, as well as a standalone version only available with Numeric Keypad.

== Generations ==
=== First generation ===
Model	Generation	Announced
iPhone 5s		September 10, 2013
iPhone 6 & 6 Plus		September 9, 2014
iPhone SE	1st generation	March 21, 2016
iPad Air	iPad Air 2	October 16, 2014
iPad Mini	iPad Mini 3	October 16, 2014
iPad Mini	iPad Mini 4	September 9, 2015
iPad Pro	12.9-inch	September 9, 2015
iPad Pro	9.7-inch	March 21, 2016
iPad	5th generation	March 24, 2017
iPad	6th generation	March 27, 2018
iPad	7th generation	September 10, 2019
iPad	8th generation	September 15, 2020
iPad	9th generation	September 14, 2021

=== Second generation ===
Model	Generation	Announced
iPhone 6s & 6s Plus		September 9, 2015
iPhone 7 & 7 Plus		September 7, 2016
iPhone 8 & 8 Plus		September 12, 2017
iPad Pro	2nd generation	June 5, 2017
iPad Air	3rd generation	March 18, 2019
iPad Mini	5th generation	March 18, 2019
iPhone SE	2nd generation	April 15, 2020
iPhone SE	3rd generation	March 8, 2022
MacBook Pro	13-inch, 2016, Four Thunderbolt 3 ports	October 27, 2016
MacBook Pro	15-inch, 2016	October 27, 2016
MacBook Pro	13-inch, 2017, Four Thunderbolt 3 ports	June 5, 2017
MacBook Pro	15-inch, 2017	June 5, 2017
MacBook Pro	13-inch, 2018, Four Thunderbolt 3 ports	July 12, 2018
MacBook Pro	15-inch, 2018	July 12, 2018
MacBook Air	Retina, 13-inch, 2018	October 30, 2018
MacBook Pro	13-inch, 2019, Four Thunderbolt 3 ports	May 21, 2019
MacBook Pro	15-inch, 2019	May 21, 2019
MacBook Air	Retina, 13-inch, 2019	July 9, 2019
MacBook Pro	16-inch, 2019	November 13, 2019
MacBook Air	Retina, 13-inch, 2020	March 18, 2020
MacBook Pro	13-inch, 2020, Four Thunderbolt 3 ports	May 4, 2020
MacBook Air	M1, 2020	November 10, 2020
MacBook Pro	13-inch, M1, 2020	November 10, 2020
MacBook Pro	14-inch, 2021	October 18, 2021
MacBook Pro	16-inch, 2021	October 18, 2021
iMac	24-inch, M1, 2021	April 20, 2021
Magic Keyboard with Touch ID		April 20, 2021
Magic Keyboard with Touch ID and Numeric Keypad		April 20, 2021
MacBook Air	13-inch, M2, 2022	June 6, 2022
MacBook Pro	M2, 2022	June 6, 2022
MacBook Pro	14-inch, 2023	January 17, 2023
MacBook Pro	16-inch, 2023	January 17, 2023
MacBook Air	15-inch, M2, 2023	June 5, 2023
iMac	24-inch, M3, 2023	October 30, 2023
MacBook Pro	14-inch, Nov 2023	October 30, 2023
MacBook Pro	16-inch, Nov 2023	October 30, 2023
MacBook Air	13-inch, M3, 2024	March 4, 2024
MacBook Air	15-inch, M3, 2024	March 4, 2024
iMac	24-inch, M4, 2024	October 28, 2024
MacBook Pro	14-inch, 2024	October 30, 2024
MacBook Pro	16-inch, 2024	October 30, 2024
MacBook Air	13-inch, M4, 2025	March 4, 2024
MacBook Air	15-inch, M4, 2025	March 4, 2024
MacBook Pro	14-inch, M5	October 14, 2025
MacBook Pro	14-inch, M5 Pro or M5 Max	March 3, 2026
MacBook Pro	16-inch, M5 Pro or M5 Max	March 3, 2026
MacBook Air	13-inch, M5	March 3, 2026
MacBook Air	15-inch, M5	March 3, 2026
MacBook Neo	A18 Pro	March 4, 2026

=== Third generation ===
Model	Generation	Announced
iPad Air	4th generation	September 15, 2020
iPad Mini	6th generation	September 14, 2021
iPad Air	5th generation	March 8, 2022
iPad	10th generation	October 18, 2022
iPad Air	M2	May 7, 2024
iPad Mini	A17 Pro	October 23, 2024
iPad	A16	March 12, 2025
iPad Air	M3	March 12, 2025
iPad Air	M4	March 2, 2026
iPhone Duo		September 9, 2026

== Hardware ==
Components of Touch ID

Touch ID is built into the home (top) button, which is built of laser-cut sapphire crystal, and does not scratch easily (scratching would prevent Touch ID from working).

It features a stainless steel detection ring to detect the user's finger without pressing it. There is no longer a rounded square icon in the home button, nor is it concave.

The sensor uses capacitive touch to detect the user's fingerprint. The sensor has a thickness of 170 μm, with 500 pixels per inch resolution. The user's finger can be oriented in any direction and it will still be read.

Apple says it can read sub-epidermal skin layers, and it will be easy to set up and will improve with every use. The sensor passes a small current through one's finger to create a "fingerprint map" of the user's dermis. Up to 5 fingerprint maps can be stored in the Secure Enclave.

== Security and privacy ==
Touch ID prompts on opening screens of the Microsoft applications: OneDrive (left) and Outlook (right) in iOS 11

Touch ID can be bypassed using passcodes set up by the user.

Fingerprint data is stored on the secure enclave inside the Apple A7 and later processors of iOS devices, the T1 and T2 on Intel Macs, and the M1 and later on Macs with Apple Silicon and recent iPads featuring M-series processors.

This data is not on Apple servers, nor on iCloud, and is not accessible by Apple or any third parties.

From the Efficient Texture Comparison patent covering Apple's Touch ID technology:

In order to overcome potential security drawbacks, Apple's invention includes a process of collapsing the full maps into a sort of checksum, hash function, or histogram. For example, each encrypted ridge map template can have some lower resolution pattern computed and associated with the ridge map. One exemplary pattern could be a histogram of, e.g., the most common angles (e.g., a 2 dimensional (2D) array of common angles). The exemplary pattern could include in each slot an average value over a respective vector of the map. The exemplary pattern could include in each slot a sum of the values over a respective vector of the map. The exemplary pattern could include the smallest or largest value within a respective vector of the map or could be a difference between a largest and a smallest value within the respective vector of the map. Numerous other exemplary embodiments are also possible, and any other exemplary pattern calculation can be used, where the exemplary pattern includes enough associated information to narrow the candidate list, while omitting enough associated information that the unsecured pattern cannot or cannot easily be reverse engineered into a matching texture.

If the user's phone has been rebooted, has not been unlocked for 48 hours, has its SIM card removed or has Emergency SOS activated, only the passcode a user has created, not their fingerprint, can be used to unlock the device or during other specific use cases. In September 2013, the German Chaos Computer Club announced that it had bypassed Apple's Touch ID security. A spokesman for the group stated:

"We hope that this finally puts to rest the illusions people have about fingerprint biometrics. It is plain pity to use something that you can't change and that you leave everywhere every day as a security token."

Similar results have been achieved by using PVA Glue to take a cast of the finger.

Others have also used Chaos Computer Club's method but concluded that it is not an easy process in either time or effort, given that the user has to use a high resolution photocopy of a complete fingerprint, special chemicals, and expensive equipment and because the spoofing process takes some time to achieve.

== Impact ==
In a 2013 New York magazine opinion piece, technology columnist Kevin Roose argued that consumers are generally not interested in fingerprint recognition, preferring to use passcodes instead. Traditionally, he wrote, only businesspeople used biometric recognition, although they believe Touch ID may help bring fingerprint recognition to the masses. Roose stated the feature will also allow application developers to experiment, should Apple open up access to Touch ID later on (which they have done), but that those wary of surveillance agencies such as the US National Security Agency may still choose not to use Touch ID.

Roose also noted that fingerprint technology still has some issues, such as the potential to be hacked, or of the device's not recognizing the fingerprint (for example, when the finger has been injured).

Adrian Kingsley-Hughes, writing for ZDNet, said Touch ID could be useful in bring your own device situations. He said the biometric protection adds another layer of security, removing the ability of people to look over others' shoulders and read their passcode/password. He added that Touch ID would prevent children from racking up thousands of dollars in unwanted purchases when using iPhones owned by adults. He observed that Touch ID was Apple's response to the large number of iPhone crimes, and that the new feature would deter would-be iPhone thieves. Moreover, he notes that the feature is one of the few that distinguish the iPhone 5S from the 5C.

Roose also stated the feature is intended to deter theft. However, Brent Kennedy, a vulnerability analyst at the United States Computer Emergency Readiness Team, expressed concern that Touch ID could be hacked and suggested that people not rely on it right away. Forbes noted a history of fingerprints being spoofed in the past, and cautioned that the fingerprints on a stolen iPhone might be used to gain unauthorized access. However, the article did say that biometrics technology had improved since tests on spoofing fingerprint readers had been conducted.

Kingsley-Hughes suggested the Touch ID as a form of two-factor authentication, combining something one knows (the password) with "something you are" (the fingerprint). Forbes said that, if two-factor authentication is available, it will be an overall improvement for security.

Forbes columnist Andy Greenberg said the fact that fingerprint data was stored on the local device and not in a centralized database was a win for security.

== See also ==
- Face ID
