= IPhone 5s =

Smartphone developed by Apple (2013–2016)

iPhone 5s

- Gold iPhone 5s
- Developer: Apple
- Type: Smartphone
- First released: September 20, 2013; 13 years ago
- Availability by region: September 20, 2013: United States; United Kingdom; Canada; China; France; Germany; India; Australia; Japan; Hong Kong; Singapore; October 25, 2013: Austria; Belgium; Bulgaria; Croatia; Czech Republic; Denmark; Estonia; Finland; French West Indies; Greece; Hungary; Ireland; Italy; Latvia; Liechtenstein; Lithuania; Luxembourg; Macau; Malta; Netherlands; New Zealand; Norway; Poland; Portugal; Reunion Island; Romania; Russia; Slovakia; Slovenia; South Korea; Spain; Sweden; Switzerland; South Africa; Thailand; November 1, 2013: Albania; Armenia; Bahrain; Bangladesh; Colombia; El Salvador; Guam; Guatemala; Macedonia; Malaysia; Mexico; Moldova; Montenegro; Saudi Arabia; Turkey; November 15, 2013: Philippines; South Africa; Vietnam; January 25, 2014: Indonesia
- Discontinued: March 21, 2016; 10 years ago
- Predecessor: iPhone 5
- Successor: iPhone 6 and 6 Plus
- Related: iPhone 5c
- Compatible networks: GSM, CDMA, 3G, 4G, EVDO, HSPA+, LTE
- Form factor: Slate
- Dimensions: 123.8 mm (4.87 in) H 58.6 mm (2.31 in) W 7.6 mm (0.30 in) D
- Weight: 112 g (3.95 oz)
- Operating system: Original: iOS 7.0; Current: iOS 12.5.8, released January 26, 2026
- System-on-chip: Apple A7
- Memory: 1 GB LPDDR3 RAM
- Storage: 16, 32, 64 GB
- Battery: 5.92 Wh (1560 mAh) Lithium-ion battery
- Rear camera: Custom Sony Exmor RS; 8 MP back-side illuminated 1/3 " sensor, HD video (1080p) at 30 fps, Slow-motion video (720p) at 120 fps, IR filter, dual warm/cool LED flash, ƒ/2.2 aperture, 30 mm focal length, face detection (stills only), image stabilization, burst mode
- Front camera: 1.2 MP, 720p HD video, Burst mode at 10 fps, f/2.4 aperture, 1.9 μm pixels, Auto HDR for photos
- Display: 4.0 in (100 mm) diagonal (16:9 aspect ratio), multi-touch display, LED backlit IPS TFT LCD, 640×1136 pixels at 326 ppi, 800:1 contrast ratio (typical), 500 cd/m^{2} max. brightness (typical), fingerprint-resistant oleophobic coating on front
- Sound: Mono speaker, 3.5 mm stereo audio jack
- Connectivity: All models: UMTS/HSPA+/DC-HSDPA (850, 900, 1900, 2100 MHz), GSM/EDGE (850, 900, 1800, 1900 MHz), Wi-Fi (802.11 a/b/g/n) (802.11n: 2.4 and 5 GHz), Bluetooth 4.0, GPS & GLONASS.; GSM model (A1533): LTE (Bands 1, 2, 3, 4, 5, 8, 13, 17, 19, 20, 25: 2100, 1900, 1800, AWS, 850, 900, 700c, 700b, 800 MHz, 800 DD).; CDMA model (A1533): UMTS/HSPA+/DC-HSDPA (1700/2100 MHz), CDMA EV-DO Rev. A and Rev. B (800, 1700/2100, 1900, 2100 MHz), (except China model:)LTE (Bands 1, 2, 3, 4, 5, 8, 13, 17, 19, 20, 25: 2100, 1900, 1800, AWS, 850, 900, 700c, 700b, 800 MHz, 800 DD).; CDMA model (A1453): UMTS/HSPA+/DC-HSDPA (1700/2100 MHz), CDMA EV-DO Rev. A and Rev. B (800, 1700/2100, 1900, 2100 MHz), LTE (Bands 1, 2, 3, 4, 5, 8, 13, 17, 18, 19, 20, 25, 26: 2100, 1900, 1800, AWS, 850, 900, 700c, 700b, 800 MHz, 800 DD).; GSM model (A1457): LTE (Bands 1, 2, 3, 5, 7, 8, 20: 2100, 1900, 1800, 850, 2600, 900 MHz, 800 DD).; GSM model (A1518): TDD-LTE, TD-SCDMA; GSM model (A1528): LTE (unofficial); GSM model (A1530): LTE (Bands 1, 2, 3, 5, 7, 8, 20, 38, 39, 40: 2100, 1900, 1800, 850, 2600, 900 MHz, 800 DD, TD 2600, 1900, 2300), (with software operator version China Mobile 15.6 or above:) TD-SCDMA
- Data inputs: Multi-touch touchscreen display, triple microphone configuration, Apple M7 motion coprocessor, 3-axis gyroscope, 3-axis accelerometer, digital compass, proximity sensor, ambient light sensor, Touch ID fingerprint reader
- Hearing aid compatibility: M3, T4
- Made in: China
- Website: Apple – iPhone 5s at the Wayback Machine (archived December 12, 2013)

The iPhone 5s is a smartphone that was developed and marketed by Apple. It is the seventh generation of the iPhone, succeeding the iPhone 5, and was unveiled in September 2013 alongside the iPhone 5c. It was the last iPhone to have Steve Jobs involved in its design.

The iPhone 5s has almost the same external design as well as the same 4-inch screen as its predecessor, the iPhone 5. The 5s received a new white/gold color scheme in addition to white/silver and space gray/black. The 5s features upgrades mostly in the form of internal hardware; it introduced the Apple A7 64-bit dual-core system-on-chip, the first 64-bit processor to be used on a smartphone, accompanied by the M7 "motion co-processor". A redesigned home button with Touch ID – a fingerprint recognition system which can be used to unlock the phone and authenticate App Store and iTunes Store purchases – was also introduced. The camera was updated with a larger aperture and a dual-LED flash optimized for different color temperatures. EarPods, which were introduced the year prior and had been shipping with the iPhone 5, were included in the box.

The iPhone 5s originally shipped with iOS 7, which introduced a revamped visual appearance among other new features. Designed by Jony Ive, iOS 7 departed from skeuomorphic elements used in previous versions of iOS in favor of a flat, colorful design. Among new software features introduced to the iPhone 5s were AirDrop, an ad-hoc Wi-Fi sharing platform; Control Center, a control panel containing a number of commonly used functions; and iTunes Radio, an internet radio service. The 5s is the first iPhone to be supported through six major versions of iOS, from iOS 7 to iOS 12, and the second iOS device to support five major updates – the first being the iPad 2 which supported iOS versions 4 to 9.

Reception towards the device was positive, with some outlets considering it to be the best smartphone available on the market due to its upgraded hardware, Touch ID, and other changes introduced by iOS 7. Some criticized the iPhone 5s for keeping the design and small display of the iPhone 5, and others expressed security concerns about the Touch ID system. Nine million units of the iPhone 5s and iPhone 5c were sold on the weekend of their release, breaking Apple's sales record for iPhones. The iPhone 5s was the best selling phone on all major U.S. carriers in September 2013.

The iPhone 5s was succeeded as Apple's flagship smartphone by the larger iPhone 6 in September 2014. On March 21, 2016, the iPhone 5s was discontinued following the release of the first-generation iPhone SE, which incorporated internal hardware similar to the iPhone 6s while retaining the smaller form factor and design of the 5s.

== History ==
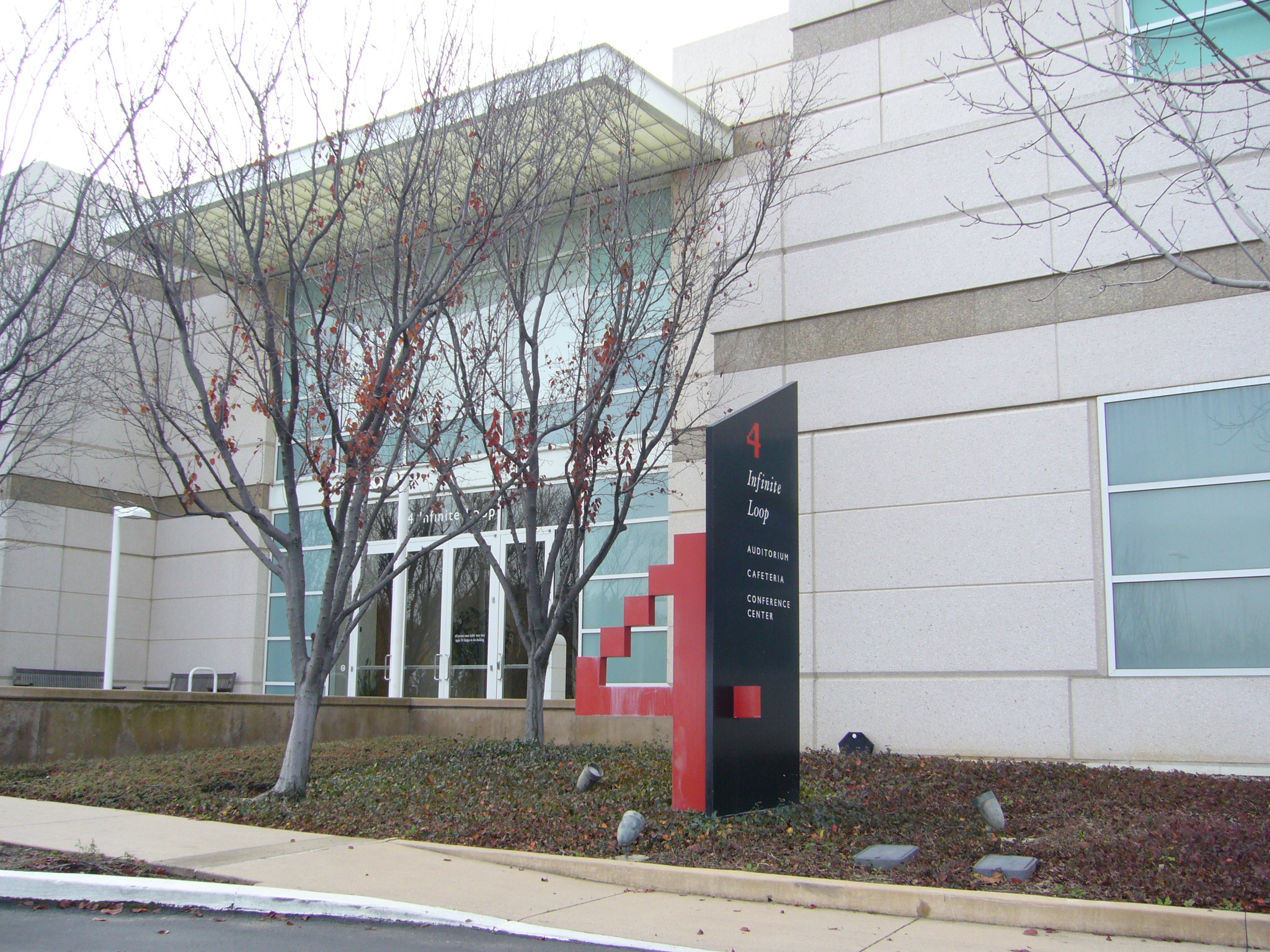
The iPhone 5s was announced during a keynote at 4 Infinite Loop on September 10, 2013.

Before its official unveiling, media speculation primarily centered on reports that the next iPhone would include a fingerprint scanner; including Apple's 2012 acquisition of AuthenTec, a developer of mobile security products, references to a fingerprint sensor on the home button in the beta release of iOS 7, and leaked packaging for an iPhone 5s showing that the traditional home button now had a metallic "ring" around it. Similar ring-based imagery was seen on the official invitation to Apple's iPhone press event in September 2013, where the new device was unveiled. Shortly before its official unveiling, The Wall Street Journal also reported the rumor.

Apple announced the iPhone 5c and the iPhone 5s during a media event at its Cupertino headquarters on September 10, 2013. While the iPhone 5c became available for preorder on September 13, 2013, the iPhone 5s was not available for preorder. Both devices were released on September 20, 2013. While most of the promotion focused on Touch ID, the 64-bit Apple A7 processor was also a highlight during the event.

This is the first-ever 64-bit processor in a phone of any kind. I don't think the other guys are even talking about it yet. Why go through all this? The benefits are huge. The A7 is up to twice as fast as the previous-generation system at CPU tasks, and up to twice as fast at graphics tasks, too.

— Phil Schiller, Apple keynote at 4 Infinite Loop on September 10, 2013

Schiller then showed demos of Infinity Blade III to demonstrate the A7's processing power and the device's camera using untouched photographs. Apple also announced during the keynote that iOS 7 would be available on September 18, 2013.

On September 20, 2013, the iPhone 5s was released in the United States, United Kingdom, Canada, China, France, Germany, Australia, Japan, Hong Kong, and Singapore. It was released in 25 additional countries on October 25, 2013, and in 12 countries on November 1, 2013. Indonesia was the last country to receive the iPhone 5s, on January 26, 2014. The iPhone 5s was succeeded as Apple's flagship smartphone by the iPhone 6 and iPhone 6 Plus on September 19, 2014, but the older model remained available for purchase at a reduced price, while the 64 GB version was discontinued. The gold edition of the iPhone 5s was discontinued on September 9, 2015, when Apple revealed the iPhone 6s and iPhone 6s Plus

The iPhone 5s was discontinued on March 21, 2016, and succeeded by the first-generation iPhone SE, which continues the same form factor but features vastly upgraded internals similar to the flagship iPhone 6s. This was a break with Apple's product positioning trend (in North America and Western Europe), starting with iPhone 4s released in October 2011, which gave each newly released model one year as the flagship phone, then moving it to midrange for its second year of production, with the third and final year as the entry-level offering before discontinuation. While the iPhone 5s was expected to continue on sale until September 2016, replacing it and its A7 processor early meant that Apple "just reduced its long-term chip support window by a year" for iOS. In addition, a new iPhone launch was meant to stimulate demand, as sales of iPhone 6s and 6s Plus had not met expectations since their September 2015 release and the iPhone family was expected to suffer its first-ever negative growth quarter in 2016.

== Specifications ==
=== Design ===
Design and Hardware of iPhone 5s

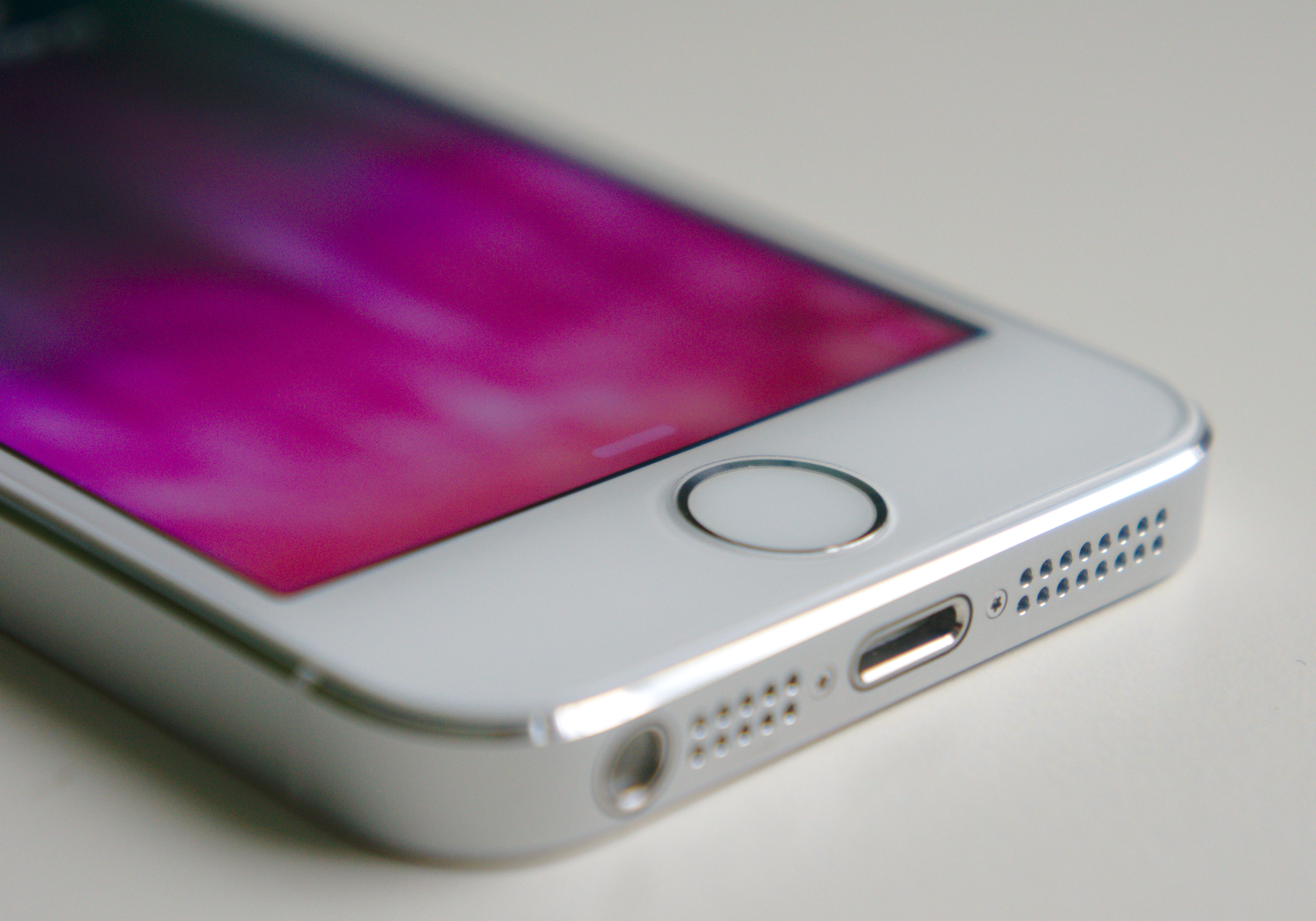
iPhone 5s's home button has a flat design and is made of scratch-resistant, laser-cut sapphire crystal surrounded by a stainless steel finger detection ring for using Touch ID.

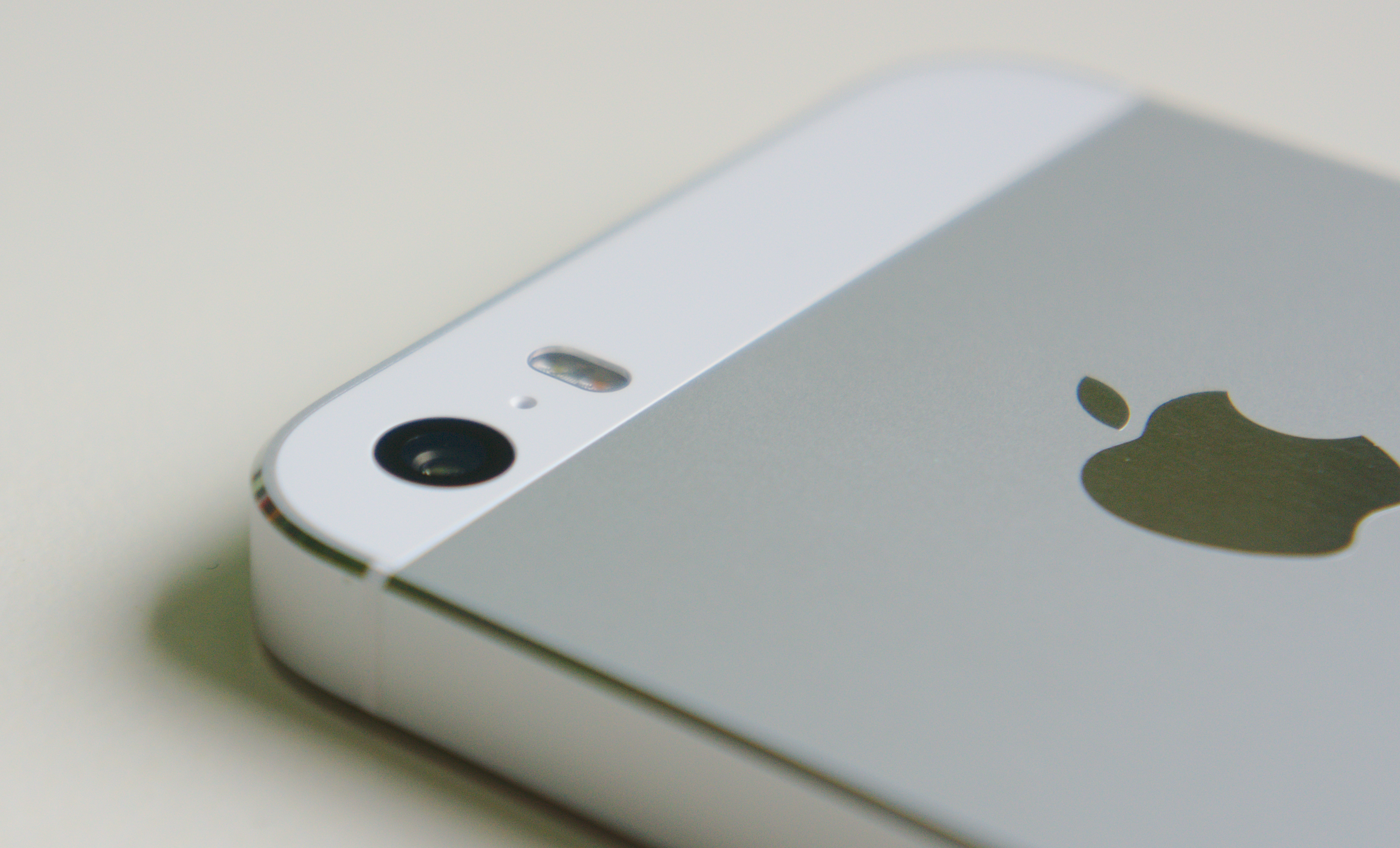
The camera has a f/2.2 aperture and has dual "True Tone" flashes.

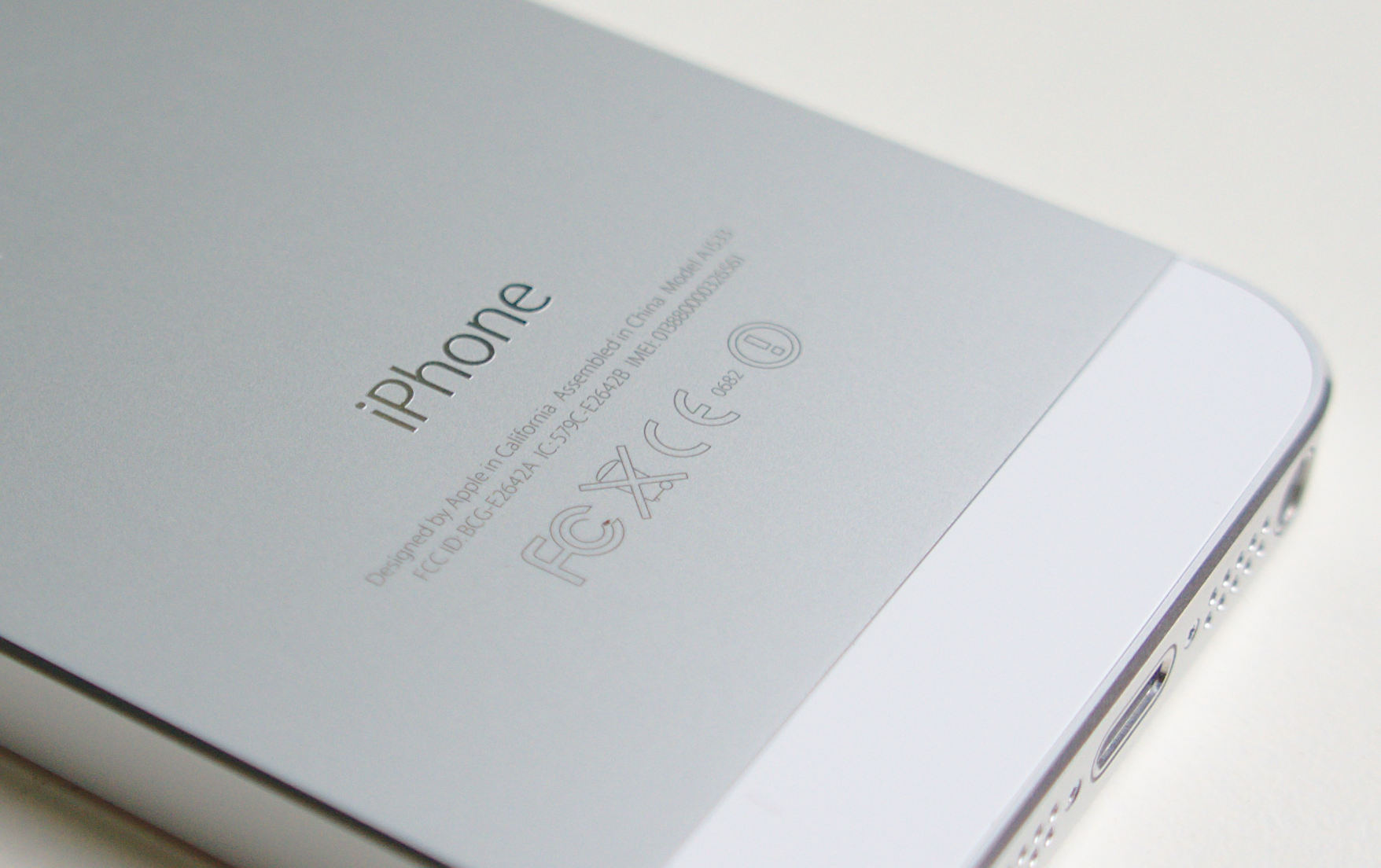
The "iPhone" wordmark on the back of an iPhone 5s is now set in a thinner version of the Myriad typeface.

The iPhone 5s maintained a similar design to the iPhone 5, with a 4 in (10 cm) LCD multi-touch Retina display and a screen resolution of 640×1136 at 326 ppi. Like the iPhone 5, the iPhone 5s features a boxlike look with flat sides and chamfered edges. The device uses an aluminum composite frame. Its home button has been updated with a new design using a laser-cut sapphire cover surrounded by a metallic ring. The button is now flat and does not contain the squircle icon seen on previous home buttons. The phone itself is 0.30 in (7.6 mm) thick and weighs 112 grams (4.0 oz). The phone is available in three color finishes; "space gray" (replacing black with slate trim on the iPhone 5), white with silver trim, and white with gold trim. The iPhone 5s was the first iPhone to be available in a gold color; this decision was influenced by the fact that gold is seen as luxurious among Chinese customers.

iPhone 5s color options
| Color | Name | Front | Antenna |
|---|---|---|---|
| | Space Gray | Black | |
| | Silver | White | White |
| | Gold | White | White |

=== Hardware ===
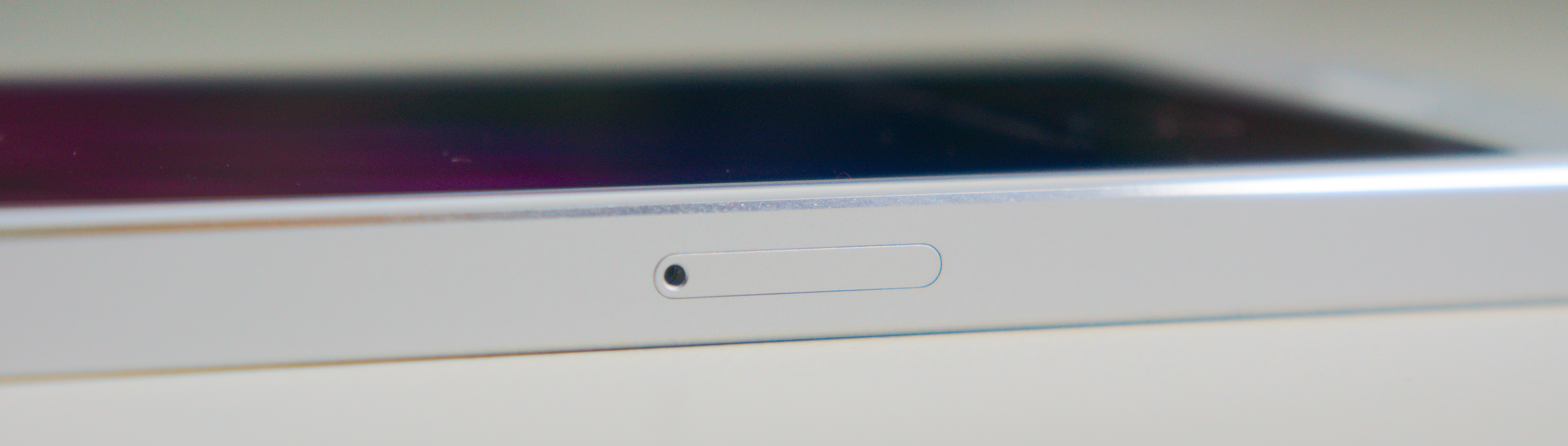
The iPhone's nano-SIM card tray is made of aluminum.

The iPhone 5s is powered by the Apple A7 system-on-chip, the first 64-bit processor ever used on a smartphone. The device's operating system and pre-loaded software were optimized to run in 64-bit mode, promising increased performance, although third-party app developers would need to optimize their apps to take advantage of these enhanced capabilities. The A7 processor was designed by Apple and manufactured by Samsung. The A7 processor is accompanied by the M7 "motion co-processor", a dedicated processor for processing motion data from the iPhone's accelerometer and gyroscopes without requiring the attention of the main processor, which integrates with iOS 7's new CoreMotion APIs. The same A7 SoC and M7 motion co-processor are also found in the iPad Air and iPad Mini 2, both of which were released in the same quarter as the iPhone 5s.

The phone includes a 1560 mAh battery, which provides 10 hours of talk time and 250 hours of standby time.

The home button on the iPhone 5s incorporates a fingerprint recognition system known as Touch ID, based on technology from AuthenTec, a company that Apple had acquired in 2012. The sensor uses a capacitive CMOS-based sensor which can detect the "sub-epidermal layers" of fingers at 500 pixels per inch, and uses a 360-degree design that can read the print at any angle. The sensor itself is activated by a touch-sensitive metallic ring surrounding the button. Touch ID can be used for various authentication activities within the operating system, such as unlocking the device or authenticating App Store and iTunes purchases instead of an Apple ID password. The sensor can be trained to recognize the fingerprints of multiple fingers and multiple users. Fingerprint data is stored in an encrypted format within a "secure enclave" of the A7 chip itself, and is not accessible to any other apps or servers (including iCloud).

=== Camera ===
==== Camera hardware ====
While the camera is still 8 megapixels in resolution with the image capture size of 3264 × 2448 (4:3), the lens has a larger aperture (f/2.2, compared to f/2.4 on the predecessor) and larger sized pixels in its image sensor than previous iPhone models. The flashlight has dual "True Tone" flashes, consisting of an amber LED and a white LED, which are variably used based on the color temperature of the photo to improve color balancing.

==== Camera software ====
The camera software includes automatic digital image stabilization, dynamic tone mapping, 10 fps burst mode and slow motion video at 120 fps.

Photos captured during the 1080p video recording have a resolution of 720p.

==== Slow-motion video ====
The iPhone 5s's camera was paired with a dual-LED flash, allowing for higher-quality nighttime photos. iOS 7 introduced a new camera app, allowing the iPhone 5s to capture fast continuous shots and record slow-motion videos with 720p at 120 frames per second and an audio track, making it the first iPhone to be able to record at any frame rate beyond 30 frames per second.

An analysis by GSM Arena suggests that the image quality of the supposedly 720p slow-motion footage resembles approximately 480p.

=== Accessories ===
Earphones known as Apple EarPods were included with the iPhone 5s. According to technology commentators, the design of the earphones is aimed to improve sound quality by allowing air to travel in and out more freely. Apple states that the design of their earphones allows it to "rival high-end headphones that cost hundreds of dollars more". Reviews by Gizmodo and TechRadar reported that although the earphones sounded better than its predecessor, reviewers felt that quality of sound produced is poor. TechRadar further opined that the EarPods are inferior to other earphones of a similar price.

=== Operating system and software ===
The iPhone 5s was initially supplied with iOS 7, released on September 20, 2013. Jonathan Ive, the designer of iOS 7's new elements, described the update as "bringing order to complexity", highlighting features such as refined typography, new icons, translucency, layering, physics, and gyroscope-driven parallaxing as some of the major changes to the design. The design of both iOS 7 and OS X Yosemite (version 10.10) noticeably departs from skeuomorphic elements such as green felt in Game Center, wood in Newsstand, and leather in Calendar, in favor of flat, colorful design.

iOS 7 adds AirDrop, an ad-hoc Wi-Fi sharing platform. Users can share files with the iPhone 5 onwards, the iPod Touch (5th generation), iPad (4th generation) onwards, or iPad Mini (1st generation) onwards. The operating system also adds Control Center, a control panel accessed by swiping up from the bottom of the screen. Control Center contains a number of commonly used functions, such as volume and brightness controls, along with toggles for enabling Wi-Fi, Bluetooth, Airplane mode, and for using the rear camera's flash LED as a flashlight.

iTunes Radio, an Internet radio service, was also included on the iPhone 5s. It was a free, ad-supported service available to all iTunes users, featuring Siri integration on iOS. Users were able to skip tracks, customize stations, and purchase the station's songs from the iTunes Store. Users could also search through their history of previous songs.

The iPhone 5s supported iOS 8, which introduced features such as Continuity and the Health app.

Notable iOS updates available for the device include iOS 9 (released in 2015), iOS 10 (released in 2016), which added support for the AirPods, and iOS 11 (released in 2017), which introduced a redesigned Control Center along with other features.

Apple announced in June 2018 that the iPhone 5s would support the iOS 12 update. This made it the second longest supported iOS device, having supported six major versions of the iOS operating system, on par with the iPad 2 which supported iOS 4 through iOS 9. The iPhone 5s would also receive speed boosts of up to 70%, according to Apple. This included the camera, keyboard and other functions.

The iPhone 5s did not receive iOS 13, released in September 2019. The last update for the iPhone 5s is iOS 12.5.8, released on January 26, 2026, to extend an expiring system certificate, over 13 years since the phone was first released.

== Apple accessories ==
During the keynote, Apple announced a case for the iPhone 5s that was made of soft microfiber on the inside and leather on the outside. This case was announced along with iPhone 5c's case, both of which were the first cases Apple had announced since the iPhone 4 Bumpers.

Docks for both the iPhone 5s and 5c were found on the Apple online store after the announcement. Because of the casing difference between the iPhone 5s and 5c, they have separate docks, each made specifically for each respective phone.

== Reception ==
=== Critical reception ===
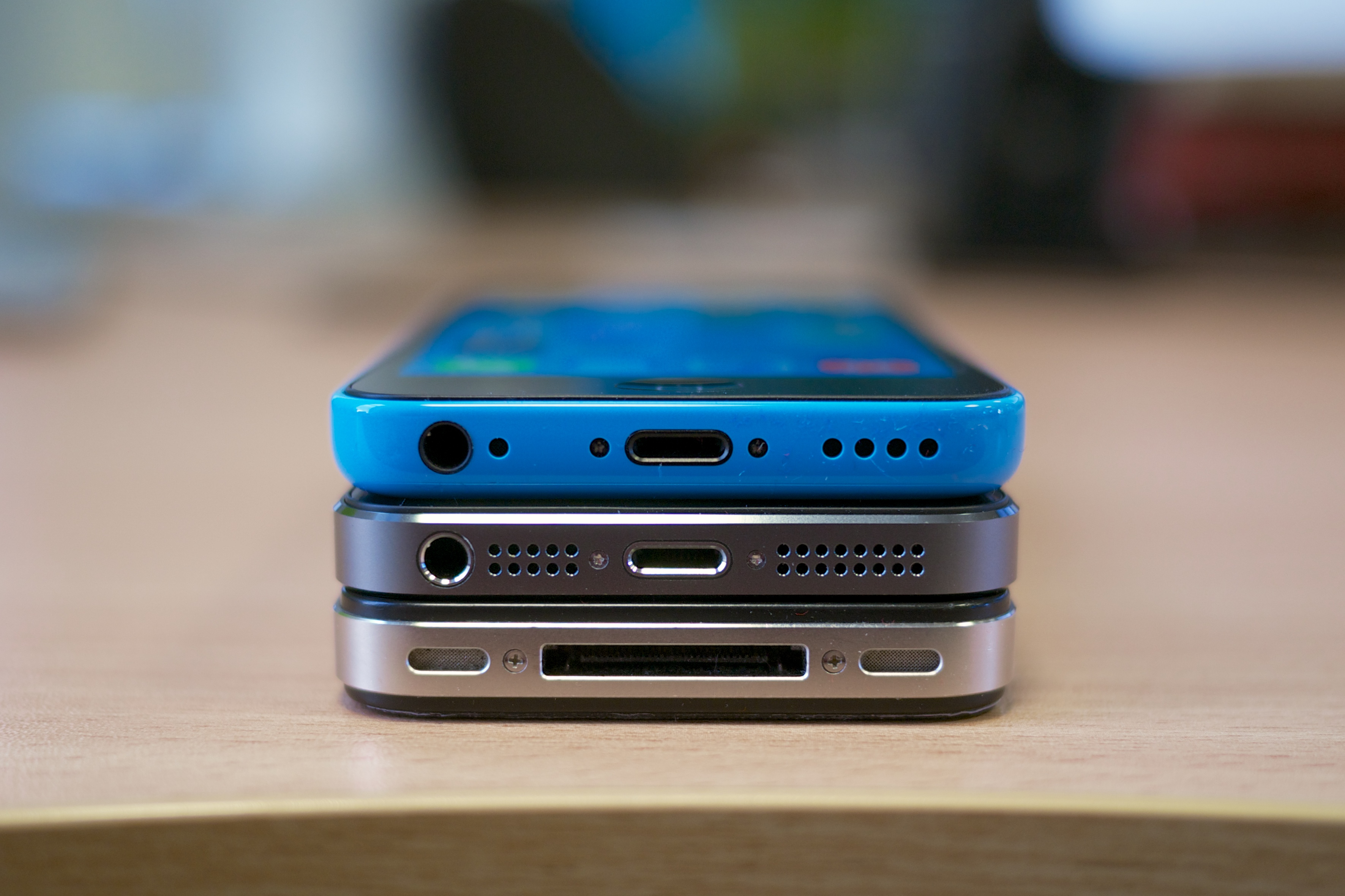
Comparison between Lightning port of the iPhone 5c (top) and iPhone 5s (middle) and the 30-pin port of the iPhone 4s (bottom)

The iPhone 5s received a positive reception from reviewers and commentators. Walt Mossberg of All Things Digital gave the phone a favorable review, saying that Touch ID "sounds like a gimmick, but it's a real advance, the biggest step ever in biometric authentication for everyday devices," and labeled it "the best smartphone on the market." David Pogue of The New York Times praised Touch ID, but said that the innovation of the smartphone market has been saturated, and "maybe the age of annual mega-leaps is over." He focused much of his review on iOS 7, which he believed was the biggest change of the device over previous generations, praising new Siri features, Control Center, and AirDrop. In an editorial, Pogue stated that iOS 7 was the biggest change in the iPhone series, citing utilitarian interface changes as the main contributor to this. Scott Stein of CNET criticized the lack of design change over iPhone 5 and said that although the iPhone 5s "is not a required upgrade, but it's easily the fastest and most advanced Apple smartphone to date." Although praised for its camera, 64-bit A7 chip, M7 motion-chip, and fingerprint scanning capabilities, some investors thought that the iPhone 5s, although a notable improvement over the iPhone 5, was still relatively unchanged from its predecessor, and worried that the iPhone line had become a stagnant, dull product. Apple's share price fell 5.4% after the launch to close at a month low of $467.71 on the NASDAQ.

Darrell Etherington of TechCrunch who praised the iPhone 5s as the best smartphone available said "looks may not be different from the iPhone 5, but the internal components have a dramatic impact on day-to-day activities normal for a smartphone user," and went into detail explaining the impact of the improved camera and specifications on the phone. Etherington suggested that the 64-bit A7 processor will not reach its full potential until developers create applications supporting it. Myriam Joire of Engadget found that the iPhone 5s could benefit significantly from the A7 if developers created applications optimized for the 64-bit processor. Anand Lal Shimpi of AnandTech praised the phone's A7 processor, describing it as "seriously impressive", and stated that it was the most "futureproof of any iPhone ever launched. As much as it pains me to use the word futureproof if you are one of those people who likes to hold onto their device for a while – the iPhone 5s is as good a starting point as any." Scott Lowe of IGN also spoke highly of its 64-bit processor, "which has a substantial lead in processing power over the HTC One and Samsung Galaxy S4, accounting for a graphics boost of up to 32% and 38% in CPU benchmarks." The debut of Apple's 64-bit A7 processor took rival Android smartphone makers by surprise, particularly Qualcomm whose own 64-bit system-on-chip was not released until 2015.

Most reviewers recommended the iPhone 5s over the iPhone 5c which was released at the same time. The 5c retained almost the same hardware as the discontinued iPhone 5, while the iPhone 5s featured substantially improved performance/features thanks to its new 64-bit A7 processor, as well as extra storage space, all for a relatively small additional upfront cost over the iPhone 5c (US$650 versus US$550 in March 2014). This was especially the case when iOS 8 was released and both iPhone 5s and iPhone 5c were moved to the mid and low end of the iPhone range, respectively; the iPhone 5s still had 16 or 32 GB (14.9 or 29.8 GiB) storage available while the iPhone 5c had to make do with 8 GB storage with only 4.9GB available to the user after installing iOS 8. Furthermore, the 5c's polycarbonate exterior received a mixed reception and was seen as a cost-cutting downgrade compared to the iPhone 5's aluminum/glass case; the 5s retained the latter design and looked even more premium due to its additional gold finish.

As of 2015–16, there were still a significant number of customers who preferred the 4-inch screen size of iPhone 5s, which remained the second-most popular iPhone after the iPhone 6 and ahead of the iPhone 6s. Apple stated in their event that they sold 30 million 4-inch iPhones in 2015, even as that form factor was succeeded as the flagship iPhone by the redesigned larger display 4.7/5.5-inch iPhone 6 and 6 Plus back in September 2014. Furthermore, the 5/5s design was regarded as "long been the golden child of Apple phone design and a benchmark for phones in general" (with the 5s's gold finish adding a premium touch to the 5's already well-regarded look), while the succeeding 6 and 6S design was less critically acclaimed as it "felt a little bit wrong, as though you were holding a slick $650 bar of soap". The iPhone 5 was described as "elegance rooted in the way the aluminum and glass work together. It felt streamlined, yet substantial, which is different from iPhone 6, which feels substantial in size alone. Plus, unlike the ubiquitous rounded corners of the 6, iPhone 5 didn't really look like anything else on the market at the time". However, the iPhone 5/5s design was not suited to scaling up, in contrast to the iPhone 6/6S which could better accommodate the growing consumer trend towards larger screen sizes and indeed spawned the 6/6S Plus phablet models. When Apple discontinued the iPhone 5s, it was replaced by the first-generation iPhone SE which outwardly appears almost identical to the 5s even as the SE's internal hardware has been upgraded significantly.

=== Commercial reception ===
The iPhone 5s and 5c sold over nine million units in the first three days, setting a record for first weekend smartphone sales, with the 5s selling three times more units than the 5c. After the first day of release, 1% of all iPhones in the US were iPhone 5Ss, while 0.3% were iPhone 5Cs. Gene Munster of Piper Jaffray reported that the line at the Fifth Avenue Apple Store contained 1,417 people on release day, compared to 1,300 for the iPhone 4 in 2010, and 549 for the iPhone 3G in 2008 on their respective release days. This was the first time that Apple launched two models simultaneously. The first-day release in China also contributed to the record sales result.

On launch day, major in-stock shortages were reported in most stores, across all countries where the iPhone 5s initially went on sale. A great many customers in line outside Apple Stores worldwide were left disappointed due to severe shortages across all 5s models, with the gold model in particular being in highly limited supply. While this situation eased in the US in the days following the launch, other countries reported receiving few restocks. Some commentators questioned how Apple handled the initial release, as online pre-orders were not offered for the iPhone 5s, meaning large numbers of people queuing outside physical stores, with most in line not receiving a unit. In the US, Apple offered an online reservation system, so customers could keep checking for units available at their local Apple Stores, and order for pickup. Online orders were also in short supply on launch day, with the shipping date across all model sizes and colors changing from "7-10 working days" to "October" in all countries, within hours of online orders being taken.

The iPhone 5s was the best selling phone on AT&T, Sprint, Verizon, and T-Mobile in September 2013 in the United States, outselling the iPhone 5c and Samsung Galaxy S4. According to Consumer Intelligence Research Partners, the iPhone 5s outsold the 5c by a two-to-one margin during its September release, confirming Apple CEO Tim Cook's view that the high-end smartphone market was not reaching a point of market saturation. While commentators viewed the 5c as a flop because of supply chain cuts signifying a decline in demand, the 5s was viewed as a massive success. Apple admitted that it had failed to anticipate the sales ratio, leading to an overstocking of the 5c and shortages of the 5s.

Six months after the release of the iPhone 5s, on March 25, 2014, Apple announced that sales of the iPhone brand had exceeded 500 million units. By May 2014, despite having been on the market for eight months, the iPhone 5s reportedly outsold the newly released Samsung Galaxy S5 by 40%, with 7 million iPhone 5s units versus 5 million Galaxy S5 units. The Galaxy S5's failure to oust the iPhone 5s from the top-selling spot was a major setback for Samsung Mobile, as the preceding Samsung Galaxy SIII and Samsung Galaxy S4, in the first quarter of their releases, had outsold the iPhone 4s and iPhone 5 respectively.

=== Impact of Touch ID ===
A number of technology writers, including Adrian Kingsley-Hughes of ZDNet and Kevin Roose of New York believed that the fingerprint scanning functionality of the iPhone 5s could help spur the adoption of the technology as an alternative to passwords by mainstream users (especially in "bring your own device" scenarios), as fingerprint-based authentication systems have only enjoyed wider usage in enterprise environments. However, citing research by biometrics engineer Geppy Parziale, Roose suggested that the CMOS-based sensor could become inaccurate and wear out over time unless Apple had designed the sensor to prevent this from occurring. Brent Kennedy, a researcher of the United States Computer Emergency Readiness Team, recommended that users not immediately rely on the technology, citing the uncertainty over whether the system could properly reject a spoofed fingerprint.

Following the release of the iPhone 5s, the German Chaos Computer Club announced, on September 21, 2013, that they had bypassed Apple's new Touch ID fingerprint sensor by using "easy everyday means". The group explained that the security system had been defeated by photographing a fingerprint from a glass surface and using that captured image to make a latex model thumb which was then pressed against the sensor to gain access. The spokesman for the group stated, "We hope that this finally puts to rest the illusions people have about fingerprint biometrics. It is plain stupid to use something that you can't change and that you leave everywhere every day as a security token." However, in 2013, 39% of American smartphone users used no security measures at all to protect their smartphone. Others have also tried Chaos Computer Club's method, but concluded that it is not an easy process in either time or effort, given that the user has to use a high resolution photocopy of a complete fingerprint, special chemicals and expensive equipment, and because the spoofing process takes some time to achieve.

=== Problems ===
Several problems were experienced with the iPhone 5s's hardware after its release. The most widely reported issue is that the angle reported by the phone's level sensor had drifted by several degrees, which caused the gyroscope, compass, and accelerometer to become inaccurate. Reports suggested that this is a hardware-induced problem. Some encountered other problems such as crashing with a blue screen and then restarting, the power button making a rattling noise when the phone was shaken, overheating, the microphone not working, and Touch ID not working for iTunes purchases. Some of these issues have since been fixed by software updates.

== See also ==
- List of iPhone models
- History of iPhone
- Timeline of iPhone models

| Preceded by iPhone 5 | iPhone; 7th generation alongside iPhone 5c | Succeeded by iPhone 6 / 6 Plus iPhone SE (1st) |
