= MacBook Air (Apple silicon) =

Line of laptops by Apple since 2020

- Developer: Apple
- Manufacturer: Foxconn; Pegatron
- Product family: MacBook
- Type: Subnotebook
- Released: November 17, 2020
- Operating system: macOS
- System on a chip: Apple M-series
- Memory: 16–32 GB unified memory (on-package LPDDR4X, LPDDR5, LPDDR5X)
- Storage: Soldered solid-state drive: 256 GB – 2 TB storage
- Display: Previous: Retina display (13.3-inch); Current: Liquid Retina display (13.6- and 15.3-inch)
- Graphics: Apple-designed integrated graphics
- Camera: FaceTime 720p or 1080p
- Touchpad: Force touch trackpad
- Power: Up to 66.5 Wh battery and 70 W GaN power adapter
- Online services: Optional on online configurations: Final Cut Pro, Logic Pro
- Marketing target: Consumer use, lightweight use
- Backward compatibility: Supports x86 software with Rosetta 2
- Predecessor: MacBook Air (Intel-based); 12-inch MacBook (indirect, fanless)
- Related: MacBook Neo; MacBook Pro (Apple silicon); iMac (Apple silicon); Mac Mini (Apple silicon); Mac Studio; Mac Pro
- Website: apple.com/macbook-air

The MacBook Air is a line of Mac-branded laptops made by Apple. In 2020, Apple stopped using Intel processors in the Air and switched to using their own Apple silicon M-series chips. Since 2026, the MacBook Air is Apple's mid-level laptop, situated above the MacBook Neo and below the MacBook Pro. As of 2026, it is sold with 13-inch and 15-inch screens.

Apple released the MacBook Air with the Apple M1 system on a chip in November 2020. A redesigned model based on the Apple M2 chip was released in July 2022, and the first 15-inch MacBook Air was released in June 2023. In March 2024, Apple introduced M3 chip–equipped MacBook Airs in both their 13- and 15-inch sizes.

== M1 (2020) ==
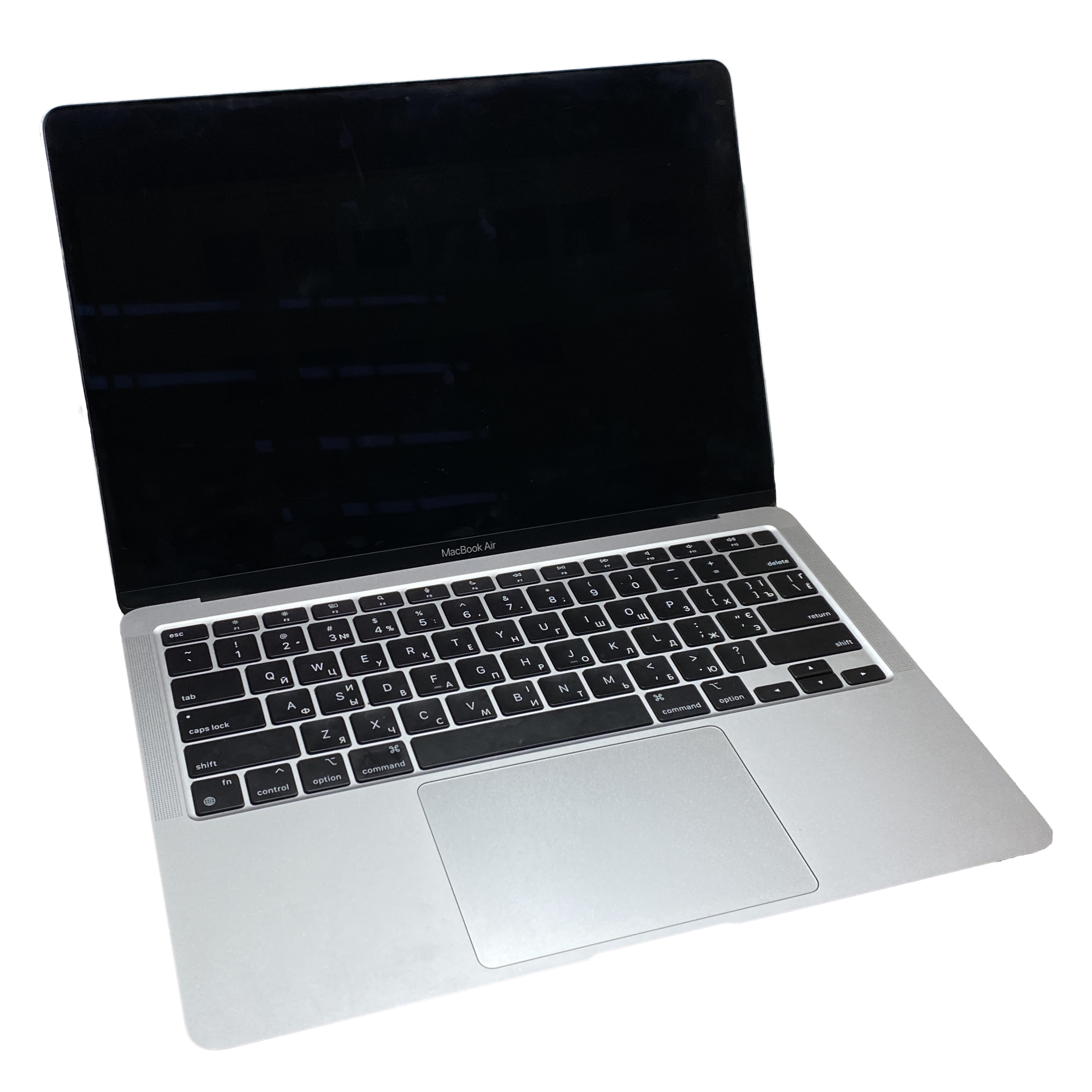
MacBook Air (M1, 2020)

On November 10, 2020, Apple announced the MacBook Air with an Apple-designed M1 system-on-a-chip (SoC), launched alongside an updated Mac Mini and 13-inch MacBook Pro as the first Macs with Apple's new line of custom ARM-based Apple silicon processors. Apple released the device a week later, on November 17.

The computer uses a fanless design and adds support for Wi-Fi 6, Thunderbolt 3/USB4 and wide color (P3). The M1 MacBook Air can only run one external display, compared to the previous Intel-based model which was capable of running two 4K displays. The FaceTime camera remains 720p, drawing some criticism, but Apple advertises an improved image signal processor for higher quality video. On March 4, 2024, the M1 MacBook Air was discontinued and replaced by the 13-inch M2 MacBook Air in the lineup.

On March 15, 2024, Walmart announced they would continue to sell the 256 GB M1 MacBook Air under a partnership with Apple despite Apple's retail store discontinuation.

=== Reception ===
The M1 MacBook Air received positive reviews, with much of the praise going to the capabilities of the M1 chip.

In his review for Engadget, Devindra Hardawar gave the MacBook Air a score of 94/100, praising the performance as "shockingly responsive" and highlighting the lack of fan noise and "excellent" keyboard and trackpad as among some of the pros. Other than that, he only lightly touched on the notebook's design and feel, citing the fact that it had not changed much since the early 2020 MacBook Air. He did, however, praise the case as feeling "sturdy as ever".

Writing for Wired, Julian Chokkattu bemoaned the fact that the Air only came with two USB-C ports, but praised the keyboard and battery life. He also lauded the fanless design, saying it was something he found himself "appreciating over and over again".

The M1 MacBook Air has suffered some problems during its lifetime. Some users reported alarmingly high solid-state drive usage and wear, which drew a lot of attention, as if the drive failed, it could not be replaced by the user. Some USB-C docks also caused Apple silicon MacBooks to stop working.

During tests, the battery life of the MacBook Air was many hours short of Apple's claims, leading to some questioning the veracity of the claims. However, when the same tests were repeated with a lower brightness setting, the computer exceeded Apple's claims. During initial testing, the battery performance of the MacBook Air was so phenomenal that Apple initially presumed the slow change of the battery meter to be a bug.

=== Technical specifications ===
Discontinued	Current

Model			13-inch, M1, 2020		
Basic Info	Hardware Strings		MacBookAir10,1		
Basic Info	Model number		A2337		
Basic Info	Part number		MGN53, MGN83, MGNC3 (Education only)	MGN63, MGN93, MGND3	MGN73, MGNA3, MGNE3
Basic Info	Date	Announced	November 10, 2020		
Basic Info	Date	Released	November 17, 2020		
Basic Info	Date	Discontinued	March 4, 2024 (Silver and Gold); March 5, 2025 (Space Gray)	March 4, 2024 (Space Gray 256 GB model for Education market and for emerging markets sold until March 5, 2025)	June 6, 2022
Basic Info	Date	Unsupported	Supported		
Basic Info	Operating System	Initial	macOS Big Sur 11.0		
Basic Info	Operating System	Latest	macOS Golden Gate 27.2		
Basic Info	MSRP(USD)		$799	$999	$1249
Colors					
Dimensions	Height		0.16 in (0.41 cm) to 0.63 in (1.6 cm)		
Dimensions	Width		11.97 in (30.4 cm)		
Dimensions	Depth		8.36 in (21.2 cm)		
Dimensions	Weight		2.8 lb (1.27 kg)		
Secure Authentication	Touch ID		Yes		
Display	Size	Diagonal	13.3 in (340 mm)		
Display	Size	Vertical-by-Horizontal	11.28 by 7.05 in (287 by 179 mm)		
Display	Resolution	Vertical-by-Horizontal	2560 × 1600		
Display	Resolution	Density	227 ppi		
Display	Resolution	Aspect Ratio	16:10		
Display	Resolution	Supported scaled resolutions	1680 × 1050 (Rendered as 3360 × 2100); 1440 × 900 (Rendered as 2880 × 1800, default); 1280 × 800 (Rendered as 2560 × 1600, native); 1024 × 640 (Rendered as 2048 × 1280)		
Display	Technology		Retina Display with IPS technology		
Display	Backlight		LED-backlit		
Display	Nano-texture configuration		No		
Display	Refresh Rate	Minimum	60 Hz		
Display	Refresh Rate	Maximum	60 Hz		
Display	Refresh Rate	ProMotion Display	No		
Display	Refresh Rate	Supported Fixed Refresh Rate	—N/a		
Display	Brightness and Contrast	SDR Max brightness	400 nits		
Display	Brightness and Contrast	XDR Max brightness	—N/a		
Display	Brightness and Contrast	Contrast ratio (typical)	1,400:1		
Display	Color	Full sRGB	Yes		
Display	Color	Wide Color (P3)	Yes		
Display	Color	Color Depth	8-bit (native) with millions of colors		
Display	Color	True Tone	Yes		
Display	Color	Night Shift	Yes		
Performance	Cooling System		Aluminum heat dissipator attached on processor, no fan included		
Performance	Chip	Chip Name	Apple M1		
Performance	Chip	Technology Node	5 nm (N5)		
Performance	Chip	Bit	64-bit		
Performance	Chip	Total CPU Cores	8		
Performance	Chip	High-performance Cores	4 × 3.20 GHz		
Performance	Chip	Energy-efficiency Cores	4 × 2.06 GHz		
Performance	Chip	Online Configuration	—N/a		
Performance	Chip	Graphics Processor	Apple G13G		
Performance	Chip	Total GPU Cores	7		8
Performance	Chip	GPU Family	Apple GPU Family 7		
Performance	Chip	Hardware-accelerated Ray Tracing	No		
Performance	Chip	Neural Accelerators in GPU	No		
Performance	Chip	Metal Support	Metal 4		
Performance	Chip	Online Configuration	—N/a		
Performance	Chip	Neural Engine	16-core (11 TOPS FP16)		
Performance	Chip	Media Engine	Hardware-accelerated H.264, HEVC		
Performance	Chip	Apple Intelligence	Yes (currently not available in China mainland)		
Performance	Unified Memory	Memory Type	LPDDR4X-4266 (2133 MHz)		
Performance	Unified Memory	Memory Bus Width	128-bit		
Performance	Unified Memory	Memory Bandwidth	68.3 GB/s		
Performance	Unified Memory	Memory Size	8 GB		
Performance	Unified Memory	Online Configuration	—N/a	16 GB	
Performance	Storage	Storage Type	PCIe 4.0-based SSD		
Performance	Storage	Storage Speed	Up to 3.3 GB/s read speed		
Performance	Storage	Storage Size	128 GB	256 GB	512 GB
Performance	Storage	Online Configuration	—N/a	512 GB; 1 TB; 2 TB	1 TB; 2 TB
Connector	HDMI		—N/a		
Connector	SDXC card slot		—N/a		
Connector	USB-C/Thunderbolt		Two Thunderbolt/USB4 USB-C ports supporting charging and DisplayPort protocols among others		
Connector	Transmission Speed		Up to 40 Gbit/s transmission speed (Thunderbolt 3 or USB4)		
Connector	External Display Support (Note: 5K at 60 Hz is equivalent to 4K at 100 Hz, 6K at 60 Hz is equivalent to 4K at 144 Hz, 8K at 60 Hz is equivalent to 4K at 240 Hz)	Maximum display	1		
Connector	External Display Support	One external display	1 × 6K at 60 Hz (Thunderbolt)		
Connectivity	Wi-Fi		Wi-Fi 6 (802.11a/b/g/n/ac/ax)		
Connectivity	Bluetooth		Bluetooth 5.0		
Keyboard and Trackpad	Type		Backlit Magic Keyboard with (scissor-switch) mechanism and ambient light sensor		
Keyboard and Trackpad	Number of keys		65 (U.S.) or 66 (ISO)		
Keyboard and Trackpad	Arrow keys		4 arrow keys in an inverted-T arrangement		
Keyboard and Trackpad	Function keys		Yes		
Keyboard and Trackpad	Touch Bar		No		
Keyboard and Trackpad	Trackpad		Force Touch trackpad		
Camera	Resolution		720p FaceTime HD		
Camera	Advanced image signal processor with computational video		Yes		
Camera	Center Stage and Desk View		No		
Audio	Speakers		Stereo speakers		
Audio	Force-cancelling woofers		No		
Audio	Wide stereo sound		Yes		
Audio	Dolby Atmos playback		Yes		
Audio	Dolby Atmos with built-in speakers		Yes		
Audio	Spatial Audio with dynamic head tracking		Yes		
Audio	Microphone		Three-mic array with high signal-to-noise ratio and directional beamforming		
Audio	3.5 mm jack		Yes		
Audio	Audio output from HDMI		No		
Power	Battery		11.4 V 49.9 W·h (4,379 mA·h)		
Power	Power adapter		30 W USB-C		
Power	Optional Configuration		—N/a		
Power	Charging method		USB-C ports		
Power	Fast Charge Capability		—N/a		

== M2 and later (2022–present) ==
On June 6, 2022, at WWDC 2022, Apple announced an updated MacBook Air based on the M2 system on a chip. It incorporates several design elements from the M1 Pro and M1 Max MacBook Pro models, such as a flat, slab-shaped design, full-sized function keys, and a Liquid Retina display with rounded corners and a notch for a 1080p webcam. It includes two combination Thunderbolt 3 / USB4 ports and adds MagSafe charging. Along with retaining the Space Gray and Silver color options, the Gold color option has been discontinued and replaced by Starlight (a color mixture between natural silver and champagne gold) in addition to a new Midnight color option (a color mixture between dark blue and dark gray).

The 13 in (330 mm) M2 MacBook Air started shipping on July 15, 2022. A 15 in (380 mm) model was announced at Apple's WWDC event on June 5, 2023. Apart from the larger screen, the hardware specs are mostly identical to the other M2 Air models. Preorders for the new model began on June 6, 2023, with deliveries and retail availability beginning the following week on June 12. On the same date, the 13 in (330 mm) M2 MacBook Air received a price cut from US$1199 to US$1099.

On March 4, 2024, Apple announced the M3 MacBook Air in both 13 in (330 mm) and 15 in (380 mm) sizes. This model retains the same design as the M2 MacBook Air, but adds support for two external displays when the lid is closed. On the same date, the 13 in (330 mm) M2 MacBook Air received a price cut from $1099 to $999 and the 15 in (380 mm) M2 MacBook Air was discontinued.

The M4 MacBook Air was announced by Apple on March 5, 2025. The starting price for both sizes were dropped by $100, with the 13 in (330 mm) model starting at $999 and $1199 for the 15 in (380 mm) model. It supports three displays (two external and the built-in screen) and raises the base memory configuration to 16 GB. The webcam was upgraded to the same 12 MP Center Stage camera present in the M4 MacBook Pro, and the Space Gray color option was replaced by a new Sky Blue color. Both the 13 in (330 mm) M2 MacBook Air and all M3 MacBook Air models were discontinued following the announcement.

On March 3, 2026, Apple announced the M5 MacBook Air. The starting price was increased from US$999 to US$1099. The base storage capacity was increased to 512 GB. The M5 MacBook Air has a 10-core CPU and can be configured up to 10 GPU cores. It also has the N1 chip and supports Wi-Fi 7 and Bluetooth 6. On June 25, 2026, the starting price for the M5 models was raised again to US$1299.

=== Reception ===
The M2 MacBook Air was generally well received. Several reviewers praised the new design, as well as the improved display, performance, and webcam. Dan Seifert of The Verge described it as "a success on virtually every level". The price increase over the M1 model was noted, with most concluding that the M1 model was a better value. Due to a lack of active cooling, the M2 can overheat on high workloads, leading to thermal throttling issues.

In the 256 GB model of the M2 MacBook Air, there was only one NAND chip present. This resulted in a slower SSD, with read speeds 40 to 50% slower and write speeds 15 to 30% slower than the 256 GB M1 model.

The M4 MacBook Air was positively received by critics, with Brenda Stolyar of Wired praising its great performance, bright display, updated webcam, long battery life, and double the base memory. Mark Spoonauer of Tom's Guide called it "the best MacBook for most people and for me the top laptop for most people, period.

=== Technical specifications ===
Discontinued	Current

==== M2 models ====
Model			13 in (330 mm), M2, 2022			15 in (380 mm), M2, 2023	
Basic Info	Hardware Strings		Mac14,2			Mac14,15	
Basic Info	Model number		A2681			A2941	
Basic Info	Part number		MLY33, MLY13, MLXW3, MLXY3	MC7X4, MC7W4, MC7U4, MC7V4	MLY43, MLY23, MLXX3, MLY03	MQKW3, MQKU3, MQKP3, MQKR3	MQKX3, MQKV3, MQKQ3, MQKT3
Basic Info	Date	Announced	June 6, 2022	October 30, 2024	June 6, 2022	June 5, 2023	
Basic Info	Date	Released	July 15, 2022	November 8, 2024	July 15, 2022	June 13, 2023	
Basic Info	Date	Discontinued	October 30, 2024	March 5, 2025 (Midnight and Starlight models for Education market and for emerging markets sold until March 4, 2026)	October 30, 2024	March 4, 2024	
Basic Info	Date	Unsupported	Supported				
Basic Info	Operating System	Initial	macOS Monterey 12.4			macOS Ventura 13.3	
Basic Info	Operating System	Latest	macOS Golden Gate 27.2				
Basic Info	MSRP (USD)		$999 (Note: The MSRP was $1199 before June 13, 2023, and $1099 before March 4, 2024)	$999	$1199 (Note: The MSRP was $1499 before June 13, 2023, and $1399 before March 4, 2024)	$1299	$1499
Colors							
Dimensions	Height		0.44 in (11 mm)			0.45 in (11 mm)	
Dimensions	Width		11.97 in (304 mm)			13.40 in (340 mm)	
Dimensions	Depth		8.46 in (215 mm)			9.35 in (237 mm)	
Dimensions	Weight		2.7 lb (1.2 kg)			3.3 lb (1.5 kg)	
Secure Authentication	Touch ID		Yes				
Display	Size	Diagonal	13.6 in (350 mm)			15.3 in (390 mm)	
Display	Size	Vertical-by-Horizontal	11.52 by 7.49 in (293 by 190 mm)			12.94 by 8.38 in (329 by 213 mm)	
Display	Resolution	Vertical-by-Horizontal	2560 × 1664			2880 × 1864	
Display	Resolution	Density	224 ppi				
Display	Resolution	Aspect Ratio	9:5.85; 16:10 without notch			9:5.825; 16:10 without notch	
Display	Resolution	Supported scaled resolutions	1710 × 1112 (Rendered as 3420 × 2224); 1470 × 956 (Rendered as 2940 × 1912, default); 1280 × 832 (Rendered as 2560 × 1664, native); 1024 × 666 (Rendered as 2048 × 1332)			1920 × 1243 (Rendered as 3840 × 2486); 1710 × 1107 (Rendered as 3420 × 2214, default); 1440 × 932 (Rendered as 2880 × 1864, native); 1280 × 828 (Rendered as 2560 × 1656); 1024 × 663 (Rendered as 2048 × 1326)	
Display	Technology		Liquid Retina Display with IPS technology				
Display	Backlight		LED-backlit				
Display	Nano-texture configuration		No				
Display	Refresh Rate	Minimum	60 Hz				
Display	Refresh Rate	Maximum	60 Hz				
Display	Refresh Rate	ProMotion Display	No				
Display	Refresh Rate	Supported Fixed Refresh Rate	—N/a				
Display	Brightness and Contrast	SDR Max brightness	500 nits				
Display	Brightness and Contrast	XDR Max brightness	—N/a				
Display	Brightness and Contrast	Contrast ratio (typical)	1,400:1				
Display	Color	Full sRGB	Yes				
Display	Color	Wide Color (P3)	Yes				
Display	Color	Color Depth	10-bit (FRC) with 1 billion colors				
Display	Color	True Tone	Yes				
Display	Color	Night Shift	Yes				
Performance	Cooling System		Aluminum heat dissipator attached on processor, no fan included				
Performance	Chip	Chip Name	Apple M2				
Performance	Chip	Technology Node	5 nm (N5P)				
Performance	Chip	Bit	64-bit				
Performance	Chip	Total CPU Cores	8				
Performance	Chip	High-performance Cores	4 × 3.49 GHz				
Performance	Chip	Energy-efficiency Cores	4 × 2.42 GHz				
Performance	Chip	Online Configuration	—N/a				
Performance	Chip	Graphics Processor	Apple G14G				
Performance	Chip	Total GPU Cores	8		10		
Performance	Chip	GPU Family	Apple GPU Family 8				
Performance	Chip	Hardware-accelerated Ray Tracing	No				
Performance	Chip	Neural Accelerators in GPU	No				
Performance	Chip	Metal Support	Metal 4				
Performance	Chip	Online Configuration	10-core GPU		—N/a		
Performance	Chip	Neural Engine	16-core (15.8 TOPS FP16)				
Performance	Chip	Media Engine	Hardware-accelerated H.264, HEVC, ProRes and ProRes RAW				
Performance	Chip	Apple Intelligence	Yes (currently not available in China mainland)				
Performance	Unified Memory	Memory Type	LPDDR5-6400 (3200 MHz)				
Performance	Unified Memory	Memory Bus Width	128-bit				
Performance	Unified Memory	Memory Bandwidth	102.4 GB/s				
Performance	Unified Memory	Memory Size	8 GB	16 GB	8 GB	8 GB	
Performance	Unified Memory	Online Configuration	16 GB; 24 GB	24 GB	16 GB; 24 GB	16 GB; 24 GB	
Performance	Storage	Storage Type	PCIe 4.0-based SSD				
Performance	Storage	Storage Speed	Up to 3.3 GB/s read speed				
Performance	Storage	Storage Size	256 GB		512 GB	256 GB	512 GB
Performance	Storage	Online Configuration	512 GB; 1 TB; 2 TB		1 TB; 2 TB	512 GB; 1 TB; 2 TB	1 TB; 2 TB
Connector	HDMI		—N/a				
Connector	SDXC card slot		—N/a				
Connector	USB-C/Thunderbolt		Two Thunderbolt 3/USB4 USB-C ports supporting charging and DisplayPort protocols among others				
Connector	Transmission Speed		Up to 40 Gbit/s transmission speed (Thunderbolt 3 or USB4)				
Connector	External Display Support (Note: 5K at 60 Hz is equivalent to 4K at 100 Hz, 6K at 60 Hz is equivalent to 4K at 144 Hz, 8K at 60 Hz is equivalent to 4K at 240 Hz)	Maximum display	1				
Connector	External Display Support	One external display	1 × 6K at 60 Hz (Thunderbolt)				
Connectivity	Wi-Fi		Wi-Fi 6 (802.11a/b/g/n/ac/ax)				
Connectivity	Bluetooth		Bluetooth 5.3				
Keyboard and Trackpad	Type		Backlit Magic Keyboard with (scissor-switch) mechanism and ambient light sensor				
Keyboard and Trackpad	Number of keys		78 (U.S.) or 79 (ISO)				
Keyboard and Trackpad	Arrow keys		4 arrow keys in an inverted-T arrangement				
Keyboard and Trackpad	Function keys		With full-height				
Keyboard and Trackpad	Touch Bar		No				
Keyboard and Trackpad	Trackpad		Force Touch trackpad				
Camera	Resolution		1080p FaceTime HD				
Camera	Advanced image signal processor with computational video		Yes				
Camera	Center Stage and Desk View		No				
Audio	Speakers		Four-speakers			Six-speakers	
Audio	Force-cancelling woofers		No			Yes	
Audio	Wide stereo sound		Yes				
Audio	Dolby Atmos playback		Yes				
Audio	Dolby Atmos with built-in speakers		Yes				
Audio	Spatial Audio with dynamic head tracking		Yes				
Audio	Microphone		Three-mic array with directional beamforming				
Audio	3.5 mm jack		With advanced support for high-impedance headphones				
Audio	Audio output from HDMI		No				
Power	Battery		52.6 W·h			66.5 W·h	
Power	Power adapter		30 W USB-C		35 W Dual USB-C		
Power	Optional Configuration		35 W Dual USB-C; 70 W USB-C		70 W USB-C		
Power	Charging method		MagSafe 3 or USB-C ports				
Power	Fast Charge Capability		70 W USB-C through MagSafe 3 or USB-C ports				

==== M3 models ====
Model			13-inch, M3, 2024					15-inch, M3, 2024				
Basic Info	Hardware Strings		Mac15,12					Mac15,13				
Basic Info	Model number		A3113					A3114				
Basic Info	Part number		MRXV3, MRXT3, MRXN3, MRXQ3	MC8K4, MC8J4, MC8G4, MC8H4	MRXW3, MRXU3, MRXP3, MRXR3	MXCV3, MXCU3, MXCR3, MXCT3	MC8Q4, MC8P4, MC8M4, MC8N4	MRYU3, MRYR3, MRYM3, MRYP3	MC9G4, MC9F4, MC9D4, MC9E4	MRYV3, MRYT3, MRYN3, MRYQ3	MXD43, MXD33, MXD13, MXD23	MC9L4, MC9K4, MC9H4, MC9J4
Basic Info	Date	Announced	March 4, 2024	October 30, 2024	March 4, 2024		October 30, 2024	March 4, 2024	October 30, 2024	March 4, 2024		October 30, 2024
Basic Info	Date	Released	March 8, 2024	November 8, 2024	March 8, 2024		November 8, 2024	March 8, 2024	November 8, 2024	March 8, 2024		November 8, 2024
Basic Info	Date	Discontinued	October 30, 2024	March 5, 2025	October 30, 2024	March 5, 2025		October 30, 2024	March 5, 2025	October 30, 2024	March 5, 2025	
Basic Info	Date	Unsupported	Supported									
Basic Info	Operating System	Initial	macOS Sonoma 14.3									
Basic Info	Operating System	Latest	macOS Golden Gate 27.2									
Basic Info	MSRP (USD)		$1099	$1099	$1299	$1299 (Note: The MSRP was $1499 before October 30, 2024)	$1499	$1299	$1299	$1499	$1499	$1699
Colors												
Dimensions	Height		0.44 in (11 mm)					0.45 in (11 mm)				
Dimensions	Width		11.97 in (304 mm)					13.40 in (340 mm)				
Dimensions	Depth		8.46 in (215 mm)					9.35 in (237 mm)				
Dimensions	Weight		2.7 lb (1.22 kg)					3.3 lb (1.50 kg)				
Secure Authentication	Touch ID		Yes									
Display	Size	Diagonal	13.6 in (350 mm)					15.3 in (390 mm)				
Display	Size	Vertical-by-Horizontal	11.52 by 7.49 in (293 by 190 mm)					12.94 by 8.38 in (329 by 213 mm)				
Display	Resolution	Vertical-by-Horizontal	2560 × 1664					2880 × 1864				
Display	Resolution	Density	224 ppi									
Display	Resolution	Aspect Ratio	9:5.85; 16:10 without notch					9:5.825; 16:10 without notch				
Display	Resolution	Supported scaled resolutions	1710 × 1112 (Rendered as 3420 × 2224); 1470 × 956 (Rendered as 2940 × 1912, default); 1280 × 832 (Rendered as 2560 × 1664, native); 1024 × 666 (Rendered as 2048 × 1332)					1920 × 1243 (Rendered as 3840 × 2486); 1710 × 1107 (Rendered as 3420 × 2214, default); 1440 × 932 (Rendered as 2880 × 1864, native); 1280 × 828 (Rendered as 2560 × 1656); 1024 × 663 (Rendered as 2048 × 1326)				
Display	Technology		Liquid Retina Display with IPS technology									
Display	Backlight		LED-backlit									
Display	Nano-texture configuration		No									
Display	Refresh Rate	Minimum	60 Hz									
Display	Refresh Rate	Maximum	60 Hz									
Display	Refresh Rate	ProMotion Display	No									
Display	Refresh Rate	Supported Fixed Refresh Rate	—N/a									
Display	Brightness and Contrast	SDR Max brightness	500 nits									
Display	Brightness and Contrast	XDR Max brightness	—N/a									
Display	Brightness and Contrast	Contrast ratio (typical)	1,400:1									
Display	Color	Full sRGB	Yes									
Display	Color	Wide Color (P3)	Yes									
Display	Color	Color Depth	10-bit (FRC) with 1 billion colors									
Display	Color	True Tone	Yes									
Display	Color	Night Shift	Yes									
Performance	Cooling System		Aluminum heat dissipator attached on processor, no fan included									
Performance	Chip	Chip Name	Apple M3									
Performance	Chip	Technology Node	3 nm (N3B)									
Performance	Chip	Bit	64-bit									
Performance	Chip	Total CPU Cores	8									
Performance	Chip	High-performance Cores	4 × 4.05 GHz									
Performance	Chip	Energy-efficiency Cores	4 × 2.75 GHz									
Performance	Chip	Online Configuration	—N/a									
Performance	Chip	Graphics Processor	Apple G15G									
Performance	Chip	Total GPU Cores	8		10							
Performance	Chip	GPU Family	Apple GPU Family 9									
Performance	Chip	Hardware-accelerated Ray Tracing	Yes									
Performance	Chip	Neural Accelerators in GPU	No									
Performance	Chip	Metal Support	Metal 4									
Performance	Chip	Online Configuration	10-core GPU		—N/a							
Performance	Chip	Neural Engine	16-core (18 TOPS FP16)									
Performance	Chip	Media Engine	Hardware-accelerated H.264, HEVC, ProRes and ProRes RAW; AV1 decode									
Performance	Chip	Apple Intelligence	Yes (currently not available in China mainland)									
Performance	Unified Memory	Memory Type	LPDDR5-6400 (3200 MHz)									
Performance	Unified Memory	Memory Bus Width	128-bit									
Performance	Unified Memory	Memory Bandwidth	102.4 GB/s									
Performance	Unified Memory	Memory Size	8 GB	16 GB	8 GB	16 GB	24 GB	8 GB	16 GB	8 GB	16 GB	24 GB
Performance	Unified Memory	Online Configuration	16 GB; 24 GB	24 GB	16 GB; 24 GB	24 GB	—N/a	16 GB; 24 GB	24 GB	16 GB; 24 GB	24 GB	—N/a
Performance	Storage	Storage Type	PCIe 4.0-based SSD									
Performance	Storage	Storage Speed	Up to 3.3 GB/s read speed									
Performance	Storage	Storage Size	256 GB		512 GB			256 GB		512 GB		
Performance	Storage	Online Configuration	512 GB; 1 TB; 2 TB		1 TB; 2 TB			512 GB; 1 TB; 2 TB		1 TB; 2 TB		
Connector	HDMI		—N/a									
Connector	SDXC card slot		—N/a									
Connector	USB-C/Thunderbolt		Two Thunderbolt 3/USB4 USB-C ports supporting charging and DisplayPort protocols among others									
Connector	Transmission Speed		Up to 40 Gbit/s transmission speed (Thunderbolt 3 or USB4)									
Connector	External Display Support (Note: 5K at 60 Hz is equivalent to 4K at 100 Hz, 6K at 60 Hz is equivalent to 4K at 144 Hz, 8K at 60 Hz is equivalent to 4K at 240 Hz)	Maximum display	1; 2 (with laptop lid closed) (Note: Requires macOS 14.3 and later)									
Connector	External Display Support	One external display	1 × 6K at 60 Hz (Thunderbolt)									
Connector	External Display Support	Two external displays	1 × 6K at 60 Hz (Thunderbolt) + 1 × 5K at 60 Hz (Thunderbolt) with laptop lid closed									
Connectivity	Wi-Fi		Wi-Fi 6E (802.11a/b/g/n/ac/ax)									
Connectivity	Bluetooth		Bluetooth 5.3									
Keyboard and Trackpad	Type		Backlit Magic Keyboard with (scissor-switch) mechanism and ambient light sensor									
Keyboard and Trackpad	Number of keys		78 (U.S.) or 79 (ISO)									
Keyboard and Trackpad	Arrow keys		4 arrow keys in an inverted-T arrangement									
Keyboard and Trackpad	Function keys		With full-height									
Keyboard and Trackpad	Touch Bar		No									
Keyboard and Trackpad	Trackpad		Force Touch trackpad									
Camera	Resolution		1080p FaceTime HD									
Camera	Advanced image signal processor with computational video		Yes									
Camera	Center Stage and Desk View		No									
Audio	Speakers		Four-speakers					Six-speakers				
Audio	Force-cancelling woofers		No					Yes				
Audio	Wide stereo sound		No									
Audio	Dolby Atmos playback		Yes									
Audio	Dolby Atmos with built-in speakers		Yes									
Audio	Spatial Audio with dynamic head tracking		Yes									
Audio	Microphone		Three-mic array with directional beamforming, Voice Isolation and Wide Spectrum microphone modes									
Audio	3.5 mm jack		With advanced support for high-impedance headphones									
Audio	Audio output from HDMI		No									
Power	Battery		52.6 W·h					66.5 W·h				
Power	Power adapter		30 W USB-C		35 W Dual USB-C							
Power	Optional Configuration		35 W Dual USB-C; 70 W USB-C		70 W USB-C							
Power	Charging method		MagSafe 3 or USB-C ports									
Power	Fast Charge Capability		70 W USB-C through MagSafe 3 or USB-C ports									

==== M4 models ====
Model			13-inch, M4, 2025			15-inch, M4, 2025		
Basic Info	Hardware Strings		Mac16,12			Mac16,13		
Basic Info	Model number		A3240			A3241		
Basic Info	Part number		MW123, MW0Y3, MW0W3, MC6T4	MW133, MW103, MW0X3, MC6U4	MC6C4, MC6A4, MC654, MC6V4	MW1L3, MW1J3, MW1G3, MC7A4	MW1M3, MW1K3, MW1H3, MC7C4	MC6L4, MC6K4, MC6J4, MC7D4
Basic Info	Date	Announced	March 5, 2025					
Basic Info	Date	Released	March 12, 2025					
Basic Info	Date	Discontinued	March 3, 2026					
Basic Info	Date	Unsupported	Supported					
Basic Info	Operating System	Initial	macOS Sequoia 15.2					
Basic Info	Operating System	Latest	macOS Golden Gate 27.2					
Basic Info	MSRP (USD)		$999	$1199	$1399	$1199	$1399	$1599
Colors								
Dimensions	Height		0.44 in (11 mm)			0.45 in (11 mm)		
Dimensions	Width		11.97 in (304 mm)			13.40 in (340 mm)		
Dimensions	Depth		8.46 in (215 mm)			9.35 in (237 mm)		
Dimensions	Weight		2.7 lb (1.22 kg)			3.3 lb (1.50 kg)		
Secure Authentication	Touch ID		Yes					
Display	Size	Diagonal	13.6 in (350 mm)			15.3 in (390 mm)		
Display	Size	Vertical-by-Horizontal	11.52 by 7.49 in (293 by 190 mm)			12.94 by 8.38 in (329 by 213 mm)		
Display	Resolution	Vertical-by-Horizontal	2560 × 1664			2880 × 1864		
Display	Resolution	Density	224 ppi					
Display	Resolution	Aspect Ratio	9:5.85; 16:10 without notch			9:5.825; 16:10 without notch		
Display	Resolution	Supported scaled resolutions	1710 × 1112 (Rendered as 3420 × 2224); 1470 × 956 (Rendered as 2940 × 1912, default); 1280 × 832 (Rendered as 2560 × 1664, native); 1024 × 666 (Rendered as 2048 × 1332)			1920 × 1243 (Rendered as 3840 × 2486); 1710 × 1107 (Rendered as 3420 × 2214, default); 1440 × 932 (Rendered as 2880 × 1864, native); 1280 × 828 (Rendered as 2560 × 1656); 1024 × 663 (Rendered as 2048 × 1326)		
Display	Technology		Liquid Retina Display with IPS technology					
Display	Backlight		LED-backlit					
Display	Nano-texture configuration		No					
Display	Refresh Rate	Minimum	60 Hz					
Display	Refresh Rate	Maximum	60 Hz					
Display	Refresh Rate	ProMotion Display	No					
Display	Refresh Rate	Supported Fixed Refresh Rate	—N/a					
Display	Brightness and Contrast	SDR Max brightness	500 nits					
Display	Brightness and Contrast	XDR Max brightness	—N/a					
Display	Brightness and Contrast	Contrast ratio (typical)	1,400:1					
Display	Color	Full sRGB	Yes					
Display	Color	Wide Color (P3)	Yes					
Display	Color	Color Depth	10-bit (FRC) with 1 billion colors					
Display	Color	True Tone	Yes					
Display	Color	Night Shift	Yes					
Performance	Cooling System		Aluminum heat dissipator attached on processor, no fan included					
Performance	Chip	Chip Name	Apple M4					
Performance	Chip	Technology Node	3 nm (N3E)					
Performance	Chip	Bit	64-bit					
Performance	Chip	Total CPU Cores	10					
Performance	Chip	High-performance Cores	4 × 4.41 GHz					
Performance	Chip	Energy-efficiency Cores	6 × 2.89 GHz					
Performance	Chip	Online Configuration	—N/a					
Performance	Chip	Graphics Processor	Apple G16G					
Performance	Chip	Total GPU Cores	8	10				
Performance	Chip	GPU Family	Apple GPU Family 9					
Performance	Chip	Hardware-accelerated Ray Tracing	Yes					
Performance	Chip	Neural Accelerators in GPU	No					
Performance	Chip	Metal Support	Metal 4					
Performance	Chip	Online Configuration	10-core GPU	—N/a				
Performance	Chip	Neural Engine	16-core (38 TOPS INT8)					
Performance	Chip	Media Engine	Hardware-accelerated H.264, HEVC, ProRes and ProRes RAW; AV1 decode					
Performance	Chip	Apple Intelligence	Yes (currently not available in China mainland)					
Performance	Unified Memory	Memory Type	LPDDR5X-7500 (3750 MHz)					
Performance	Unified Memory	Memory Bus Width	128-bit					
Performance	Unified Memory	Memory Bandwidth	120 GB/s					
Performance	Unified Memory	Memory Size	16 GB		24 GB	16 GB		24 GB
Performance	Unified Memory	Online Configuration	24 GB; 32 GB		32 GB	24 GB; 32 GB		32 GB
Performance	Storage	Storage Type	PCIe 4.0-based SSD					
Performance	Storage	Storage Speed	Up to 3.3 GB/s read speed					
Performance	Storage	Storage Size	256 GB	512 GB		256 GB	512 GB	
Performance	Storage	Online Configuration	512 GB; 1 TB; 2 TB	1 TB; 2 TB		512 GB; 1 TB; 2 TB	1 TB; 2 TB	
Connector	HDMI		—N/a					
Connector	SDXC card slot		—N/a					
Connector	USB-C/Thunderbolt		Two Thunderbolt 4 USB-C ports supporting charging and DisplayPort protocols among others					
Connector	Transmission Speed		Up to 40 Gbit/s transmission speed (Thunderbolt 4 or USB4)					
Connector	External Display Support (Note: 5K at 60 Hz is equivalent to 4K at 100 Hz, 6K at 60 Hz is equivalent to 4K at 144 Hz, 8K at 60 Hz is equivalent to 4K at 240 Hz)	Maximum display	2					
Connector	External Display Support	One external display	1 × 8K at 60 Hz or 1 × 5K at 120 Hz or 1 × 4K at 240 Hz (Thunderbolt)					
Connector	External Display Support	Two external displays	2 × 6K at 60 Hz (or 4K at 144 Hz) (Thunderbolt)					
Connectivity	Wi-Fi		Wi-Fi 6E (802.11a/b/g/n/ac/ax)					
Connectivity	Bluetooth		Bluetooth 5.3					
Keyboard and Trackpad	Type		Backlit Magic Keyboard with (scissor-switch) mechanism and ambient light sensor					
Keyboard and Trackpad	Number of keys		78 (U.S.) or 79 (ISO)					
Keyboard and Trackpad	Arrow keys		4 arrow keys in an inverted-T arrangement					
Keyboard and Trackpad	Function keys		With full-height					
Keyboard and Trackpad	Touch Bar		No					
Keyboard and Trackpad	Trackpad		Force Touch trackpad					
Camera	Resolution		12 MP camera with 1080p FaceTime HD					
Camera	Advanced image signal processor with computational video		Yes					
Camera	Center Stage and Desk View		Yes					
Audio	Speakers		Four-speakers			Six-speakers		
Audio	Force-cancelling woofers		No			Yes		
Audio	Wide stereo sound		No					
Audio	Dolby Atmos playback		Yes					
Audio	Dolby Atmos with built-in speakers		Yes					
Audio	Spatial Audio with dynamic head tracking		Yes					
Audio	Microphone		Three-mic array with directional beamforming, Voice Isolation and Wide Spectrum microphone modes					
Audio	3.5 mm jack		With advanced support for high-impedance headphones					
Audio	Audio output from HDMI		No					
Power	Battery		53.8 W·h			66.5 W·h		
Power	Power adapter		30 W USB-C	35 W Dual USB-C				
Power	Optional Configuration		35 W Dual USB-C; 70 W USB-C	70 W USB-C				
Power	Charging method		MagSafe 3 or USB-C ports					
Power	Fast Charge Capability		70 W USB-C through MagSafe 3 or USB-C ports					

==== M5 models ====
Model			13-inch, M5			15-inch, M5		
Basic Info	Hardware Strings		Mac17,3			Mac17,4		
Basic Info	Model number		A3449			A3448		
Basic Info	Part number		MDHH4, MDH74, MDHA4, MDHE4	MDHJ4, MDH84, MDHC4, MDHF4	MDHK4, MDH94, MDHD4, MDHG4	MDVQ4, MDV94, MDVD4, MDVH4	MDVT4, MDVA4, MDVE4, MDVK4	MDVU4, MDVC4, MDVF4, MDVN4
Basic Info	Date	Announced	March 3, 2026					
Basic Info	Date	Released	March 11, 2026					
Basic Info	Date	Discontinued	In production					
Basic Info	Date	Unsupported	Supported					
Basic Info	Operating System	Initial	macOS Tahoe 26.3					
Basic Info	Operating System	Latest	macOS Golden Gate 27.2					
Basic Info	MSRP (USD)		$1299 (Note: The MSRP was $1099 before June 25, 2026.)	$1599 (Note: The MSRP was $1299 before June 25, 2026.)	$1799 (Note: The MSRP was $1499 before June 25, 2026.)	$1499 (Note: The MSRP was $1299 before June 25, 2026.)	$1799 (Note: The MSRP was $1499 before June 25, 2026.)	$1999 (Note: The MSRP was $1699 before June 25, 2026.)
Colors								
Dimensions	Height		0.44 in (11 mm)			0.45 in (11 mm)		
Dimensions	Width		11.97 in (304 mm)			13.40 in (340 mm)		
Dimensions	Depth		8.46 in (215 mm)			9.35 in (237 mm)		
Dimensions	Weight		2.7 lb (1.22 kg)			3.3 lb (1.50 kg)		
Secure Authentication	Touch ID		Yes					
Display	Size	Diagonal	13.6 in (350 mm)			15.3 in (390 mm)		
Display	Size	Vertical-by-Horizontal	11.52 by 7.49 in (293 by 190 mm)			12.94 by 8.38 in (329 by 213 mm)		
Display	Resolution	Vertical-by-Horizontal	2560 × 1664			2880 × 1864		
Display	Resolution	Density	224 ppi					
Display	Resolution	Aspect Ratio	9:5.85; 16:10 without notch			9:5.825; 16:10 without notch		
Display	Resolution	Supported scaled resolutions	1710 × 1112 (Rendered as 3420 × 2224); 1470 × 956 (Rendered as 2940 × 1912, default); 1280 × 832 (Rendered as 2560 × 1664, native); 1024 × 666 (Rendered as 2048 × 1332)			1920 × 1243 (Rendered as 3840 × 2486); 1710 × 1107 (Rendered as 3420 × 2214, default); 1440 × 932 (Rendered as 2880 × 1864, native); 1280 × 828 (Rendered as 2560 × 1656); 1024 × 663 (Rendered as 2048 × 1326)		
Display	Technology		Liquid Retina Display with IPS technology					
Display	Backlight		LED-backlit					
Display	Nano-texture configuration		No					
Display	Refresh Rate	Minimum	60 Hz					
Display	Refresh Rate	Maximum	60 Hz					
Display	Refresh Rate	ProMotion Display	No					
Display	Refresh Rate	Supported Fixed Refresh Rate	—N/a					
Display	Brightness and Contrast	SDR Max brightness	500 nits					
Display	Brightness and Contrast	XDR Max brightness	—N/a					
Display	Brightness and Contrast	Contrast ratio (typical)	1,400:1					
Display	Color	Full sRGB	Yes					
Display	Color	Wide Color (P3)	Yes					
Display	Color	Color Depth	10-bit (FRC) with 1 billion colors					
Display	Color	True Tone	Yes					
Display	Color	Night Shift	Yes					
Performance	Cooling System		Aluminum heat dissipator attached on processor, no fan included					
Performance	Chip	Chip Name	Apple M5					
Performance	Chip	Technology Node	3 nm (N3P)					
Performance	Chip	Bit	64-bit					
Performance	Chip	Total CPU Cores	10					
Performance	Chip	High-performance Cores	4 × 4.61 GHz (Super cores)					
Performance	Chip	Energy-efficiency Cores	6 × 3.04 GHz					
Performance	Chip	Online Configuration	—N/a					
Performance	Chip	Graphics Processor	Apple G17G					
Performance	Chip	Total GPU Cores	8	10				
Performance	Chip	GPU Family	Apple GPU Family 10					
Performance	Chip	Hardware-accelerated Ray Tracing	Yes					
Performance	Chip	Neural Accelerators in GPU	Yes					
Performance	Chip	Metal Support	Metal 4					
Performance	Chip	Online Configuration	10-core GPU	—N/a				
Performance	Chip	Neural Engine	16-core (38 TOPS INT8)					
Performance	Chip	Media Engine	Hardware-accelerated H.264, HEVC, ProRes and ProRes RAW; AV1 decode					
Performance	Chip	Apple Intelligence	Yes (currently not available in China mainland)					
Performance	Unified Memory	Memory Type	LPDDR5X-9600 (4800 MHz)					
Performance	Unified Memory	Memory Bus Width	128-bit					
Performance	Unified Memory	Memory Bandwidth	153.6 GB/s					
Performance	Unified Memory	Memory Size	16 GB		24 GB	16 GB		24 GB
Performance	Unified Memory	Online Configuration	24 GB; 32 GB		32 GB	24 GB; 32 GB		32 GB
Performance	Storage	Storage Type	PCIe 5.0-based SSD					
Performance	Storage	Storage Speed	Up to 6.6 GB/s read speed					
Performance	Storage	Storage Size	512 GB	1 TB		512 GB	1 TB	
Performance	Storage	Online Configuration	1 TB; 2 TB; 4 TB	2 TB; 4 TB		1 TB; 2 TB; 4 TB	2 TB; 4 TB	
Connector	HDMI		—N/a					
Connector	SDXC card slot		—N/a					
Connector	USB-C/Thunderbolt		Two Thunderbolt 4 USB-C ports supporting charging and DisplayPort protocols among others					
Connector	Transmission Speed		Up to 40 Gbit/s transmission speed (Thunderbolt 4 or USB4)					
Connector	External Display Support (Note: 5K at 60 Hz is equivalent to 4K at 100 Hz, 6K at 60 Hz is equivalent to 4K at 144 Hz, 8K at 60 Hz is equivalent to 4K at 240 Hz)	Maximum display	2					
Connector	External Display Support	One external display	1 × 8K at 60 Hz or 1 × 5K at 120 Hz or 1 × 4K at 240 Hz (Thunderbolt)					
Connector	External Display Support	Two external displays	2 × 6K at 60 Hz or 2 × 4K at 144 Hz (Thunderbolt)					
Connectivity	Wi-Fi		Wi-Fi 7 (802.11a/b/g/n/ac/ax/be)					
Connectivity	Bluetooth		Bluetooth 6					
Keyboard and Trackpad	Type		Backlit Magic Keyboard with (scissor-switch) mechanism and ambient light sensor					
Keyboard and Trackpad	Number of keys		78 (U.S.) or 79 (ISO)					
Keyboard and Trackpad	Arrow keys		4 arrow keys in an inverted-T arrangement					
Keyboard and Trackpad	Function keys		With full-height					
Keyboard and Trackpad	Touch Bar		No					
Keyboard and Trackpad	Trackpad		Force Touch trackpad					
Camera	Resolution		12 MP camera with 1080p FaceTime HD					
Camera	Advanced image signal processor with computational video		Yes					
Camera	Center Stage and Desk View		Yes					
Audio	Speakers		Four-speakers			Six-speakers		
Audio	Force-cancelling woofers		No			Yes		
Audio	Wide stereo sound		No					
Audio	Dolby Atmos playback		Yes					
Audio	Dolby Atmos with built-in speakers		Yes					
Audio	Spatial Audio with dynamic head tracking		Yes					
Audio	Microphone		Three-mic array with directional beamforming, Voice Isolation and Wide Spectrum microphone modes					
Audio	3.5 mm jack		With advanced support for high-impedance headphones					
Audio	Audio output from HDMI		No					
Power	Battery		53.8 W·h			66.5 W·h		
Power	Power adapter		40 W USB-C with 60 W Max; Charger is not included in Europe					
Power	Optional Configuration		40 W USB-C with 60 W Max (Europe); 35 W Dual USB-C; 70 W USB-C					
Power	Charging method		MagSafe 3 or USB-C ports					
Power	Fast Charge Capability		70 W USB-C through MagSafe 3 or USB-C ports					

== Software and operating systems ==
The macOS operating system has been pre-installed on all Apple silicon MacBook Air computers since release, starting with macOS Big Sur, which is the minimum required version of macOS that can run on and was made for Apple silicon Macs.

Supported macOS releases
OS release	M1, 2020	M2, 2022	M2, 2023	M3, 2024	M4, 2025	M5
11 Big Sur	Yes	—N/a	—N/a	—N/a	—N/a	—N/a
12 Monterey	Yes	Yes	—N/a	—N/a	—N/a	—N/a
13 Ventura	Yes	Yes	Yes	—N/a	—N/a	—N/a
14 Sonoma	Yes	Yes	Yes	Yes	—N/a	—N/a
15 Sequoia	Yes	Yes	Yes	Yes	Yes	—N/a
26 Tahoe	Yes	Yes	Yes	Yes	Yes	Yes
27 Golden Gate	Yes	Yes	Yes	Yes	Yes	Yes

== Timeline ==
Timeline of portable Macintoshes
See also: List of Mac models
