= Magic Keyboard =

The Magic Keyboard is an Apple trademark used on several of their keyboards, referring to:

- Magic Keyboard (Mac), a wireless keyboard released by Apple in 2015, bundled with iMac and Mac Pro.
- Magic Keyboard for iPad, a wireless keyboard with an integrated trackpad for use in iPads with a Smart Connector, released in 2020
- The built-in keyboard of the MacBook Pro since 2019, the MacBook Air since 2020, and the MacBook Neo since 2026. Older Apple notebook keyboards that used the butterfly-switch mechanism do not use this brand name.
