= AuthenTec =

Former company; now subsidiary of Apple, Inc.

AuthenTec, Inc.
- Type: Public
- Traded as: Nasdaq: AUTH
- Industry: Semiconductor, computer security, mobile security, biometrics, identity management
- Predecessor: Division of Harris Semiconductor Corporation
- Fate: Acquired by Apple
- Headquarters: Melbourne, Florida, United States
- Area served: Worldwide
- Products: Mobile security solutions, biometrics technology
- Parent: Apple
- Website: authentec.com

AuthenTec, Inc. was a semiconductor, computer security, mobile security, identity management, biometrics, and touch control solutions company based in Melbourne, Florida. Founded in 1998 after being spun off from Harris Semiconductor, AuthenTec provided mobile security software licenses to mobile manufacturing companies, and biometrics sensor technology, such as fingerprint sensors and NFC technology to mobile and computer manufacturers. On 27 July 2012, AuthenTec was acquired by Apple for $356 million.

== History ==
In 1998, AuthenTec was spun off from parent company Harris Semiconductor, and in June 2007 became a publicly traded company.

In 2008, AuthenTec acquired EzValidation. Then in 2009, AuthenTec acquired Atrua Technologies for $5m. In 2010, AuthenTec acquired SafeNet's Embedded Security Solutions division and merged with UPEK.

On 2 August 2011, AuthenTec began collaborating with NXP Semiconductors and mobile payment software firm DeviceFidelity to provide a combination of wireless chips, sensors, mobile applications and micro-SD cards to manufacturers and mobile network carriers of Android devices to support NFC mobile payments and transportation check-ins.

AuthenTec was acquired by Apple for $356 million on 27 July 2012.

== Products and services ==
- TruePrint smart sensors
- TrueSuite identity management software
- TrueProtect embedded security products (formerly SafeNet Embedded Security Solutions)
- Touch ID
