= History of iTunes =

History of the iTunes application and e-commerce platform

The iTunes media platform was first released by Apple in 2001 as a simple music player for Mac computers. Over time, iTunes developed into a sophisticated multimedia content manager, hardware synchronization manager and e-commerce platform. iTunes was finally discontinued for new Mac computers in 2019, but is still available and supported for Macs running older operating systems and for Windows computers to ensure updated compatibility for syncing with new releases of iOS devices (refer to Devices section).

iTunes enables users to manage media content, create playlists, synchronize media content with handheld devices including the iPod, iPhone, and iPad, re-image and update handheld devices, stream Internet radio and purchase music, films, television shows, and audiobooks via the iTunes Store.

iTunes has been credited with accelerating shifts within the music industry. The pricing structure of iTunes encouraged the sale of single songs, allowing users to abandon the purchase of more expensive albums. This hastened the end of the Album Era in popular music.

== History ==
In 2000, Apple purchased the MP3 encoder-and-player software SoundJam MP, a program developed by Bill Kincaid and released by Casady & Greene in 1999. At the time of the purchase, Kincaid, Jeff Robbin and Dave Heller left Casady & Greene to continue development of the program as Apple employees. At Apple, the developers simplified SoundJam's user interface, added the ability to burn CDs, and removed the program's recording feature and skin support.

iTunes v1.0 installer CD (2001)

On January 9, 2001, at Macworld San Francisco, Apple released version 1.0 of the program under the name iTunes for Mac OS 9. Macintosh users immediately began poking through iTunes's resource fork, where they discovered numerous strings and other resources that indicated that iTunes was a re-engineered SoundJam MP. Casady & Greene ceased distribution of SoundJam MP on June 1, 2001, at the request of the developers.

In March 2001, iTunes began to support Mac OS X with the release of version 1.1. Release 2.0 added support for the new iPod. Version 3 dropped Mac OS 9 support but added smart playlists and a ratings system. In April 2003, version 4.0 introduced the iTunes Store; in October, version 4.1 added support for Microsoft Windows 2000 and Windows XP. Introduced at Macworld 2005 with the new iPod Shuffle, Version 4.7.1 introduced the ability to convert higher-bitrate songs to 128 kbit/s AAC automatically, as these devices did not natively support audio encoded in AIFF or Apple Lossless formats, also improving the value proposition of the Shuffle's limited flash-only storage. Version 7.0 introduced gapless playback and Cover Flow in September 2006. In March 2007, iTunes 7.1 added support for Windows Vista, and 7.3.2 was the last Windows 2000 version.

Until January 16, 2008, with the 7.6 update, iTunes lacked support for 64-bit versions of Windows. iTunes is currently supported under any 64-bit version of Windows, although the iTunes executable was still 32-bit until version 12.1. The 64-bit versions of Windows XP and Windows Server 2003 are not supported by Apple, but a workaround has been devised for both operating systems. Version 8.0 added Genius playlists, a grid view, and a new default visualizer.

On September 9, 2009, iTunes 9 added Home Sharing, enabling automatic updating of purchased items across other computers on the same subnet and offering a new iTunes Store UI. Genius Mixes were added, as well as improved App synchronization abilities, extending the iPod Shuffle 128 kbit/s down-convert feature to all of Apple's AAC-capable devices. It also adds iTunes LPs to the store, which gives additional media with an album. Apple added iTunes Extras as well to the store, which adds content usually reserved for films on DVD and Blu-ray discs. Both iTunes LPs and Extras use web-standards HTML, JavaScript, and CSS.

On September 1, 2010, Apple held their annual music press event where they unveiled an updated version: iTunes 10. The new version was available for download later that day. One major was iTunes Ping, which brought a social factor to the iTunes experience. Apple CEO Steve Jobs also announced a new logo, one without a CD in the background, because of the increasing popularity of iTunes digital downloads.

In October 2012, Apple announced the launch of the iPhone 5 and iPad Mini, the refresh of the iPod and Mac lines, and the upcoming release of iTunes 11. Slated for release by the end of October, the launch was pushed back to November 29, 2012. This version included tighter integration with iCloud, and a new user interface. Users' libraries now include all media they have stored in their iCloud account, along with any media unique to the device they are using. Media files stored in the cloud don't need to be downloaded before playing, allowing a larger collection to be accessible without increased disk usage. The new user interface includes a refreshed grid view, which replaces Cover Flow as the default layout method. With this change, Cover Flow is no longer available within the application. With the release of this software, the iTunes Store was redesigned to remain consistent with the new interface, and the stores available on iOS devices. The social element Ping was also removed and replaced by increased Twitter and Facebook integration. Other minor changes included disabling the sidebar by default, and slightly altering the icon to match that of the Mac App Store better.

On October 16, 2014, Apple released iTunes 12, with a redesigned icon and interface, inspired by OS X Yosemite. With iTunes 12.1 and later, there is a new widget for notification center in OS X Yosemite, which allows the user to see what's playing, skip ahead, and even buy songs from iTunes Radio, right from notification center. It also improves performance when syncing to an iOS device.

iTunes icon since version 12.2 on June 30, 2015

On April 26, 2018, Apple released iTunes 12 for Windows 10 via the Windows Store. The Universal Windows Platform app retains all features available in the desktop version, but will be updated and available through the Windows Store.

On June 3, 2019, Apple stated that they would no longer include iTunes with future Mac computers. Starting with the operating system macOS Catalina, Apple instead split iTunes into separate apps: Apple Music, Apple TV, and Apple Podcasts. iTunes continues to be available on Windows and on macOS operating systems prior to Catalina. Users can also still install iTunes versions 10, 11, and 12 on macOS Catalina to macOS Sonoma using the Retroactive app.

== Compatibility ==
=== Operating system versions ===
Obsolete	Discontinued, still can access the iTunes store	Current

Operating system		Original version	Latest version	Support status
macOS	9	1.0	2.0.4	2001-2002
macOS	10.0	1.1	1.1.1	2001
macOS	10.1	1.1.2	4.7.1	2001-2005
macOS	10.2 Jaguar	3.0	6.0.5	2002-2006
macOS	10.3 Panther	4.1	7.7.1	2003 -2008
macOS	10.4 Tiger (G3)	4.7.1	9.1.1	2005-2010
macOS	10.4 Tiger (G4, G5)	4.7.1	9.2.1	2005-2010
macOS	10.4 Tiger (Intel)	6.0.2	9.2.1	2006-2010
macOS	10.5 Leopard	7.4.2	10.6.3	2007-2012
macOS	10.6 Snow Leopard	8.2.1	11.4	2009-2014
macOS	10.7 Lion	10.4	12.2.2	2011-2015
macOS	10.8 Mountain Lion	10.6.3	12.4.3	2012-2016
macOS	10.9 Mavericks	11.1.2	12.6.2	2013-2017
macOS	10.10 Yosemite	12.0.1	12.8.1	2014-2019
macOS	10.11 El Capitan	12.2.2	12.8.2	2015-2019
macOS	10.12 Sierra	12.5.1	12.8.2	2016-2019
macOS	10.13 High Sierra	12.7	12.8.3	2017-2021
macOS	10.14 Mojave	12.9	12.9.5	2018-2021
Windows	2000	4.1	7.3.2	2003-2007
Windows	XP 32-bit	4.1	12.1.3.6	2003-2015
Windows	Vista 32-bit	7.4	12.1.3.6	2007-2015
Windows	Vista 64-bit	7.6	12.1.3.6	2008-2015
Windows	7	9.1	12.10.11.2	2010-2021
Windows	8	11.0.4	12.10.11.2	2013-2021
Windows	8.1	11.1.1	12.10.11.2	2013-2021
Windows	10	12.13.11	12.13.9.1	2015-
Windows	11	12.13.11	12.13.9.1	2021-

- iTunes 2.0.4 can only run if Classic is installed. Otherwise, Mac OS X 10.0 can only run iTunes 1.1.1 natively.
- iTunes Store requires at least version 12 for a user to sign in and make purchases, dropping support for earlier versions.
- On May 25, 2018, Apple dropped support for Windows XP and Vista, no longer allowing new purchases or re-downloading of previous purchases.
- On June 30, 2018, TLS 1.0 was discontinued, affecting devices on iOS 4.3.5, OS X 10.8.5 Mountain Lion and earlier. On both Windows and Mac computers, the minimum version able to manage accounts & edit payment information are iTunes 12.6.4 (released in April 2018) and 12.7.5 (released in May 2018).
- To manually update iOS device drivers on Mac computers, users can extract & install the MobileDevice.pkg package that is bundled inside the latest version of Xcode installer.
- To manually update iOS device drivers on Windows computers, users can extract & install the AppleMobileDeviceSupport.msi (32-bit) / AppleMobileDeviceSupport64.msi (64-bit) package that is bundled inside the latest version of iTunes installer.
- Although new versions of iTunes have not been released for Mac computers since May 2019, mobile device driver updates for new iOS releases (i.e iOS 13, 14, 15) have been backported to iTunes 12.8 (for OS X 10.11 El Capitan, macOS 10.12 Sierra, 10.13 High Sierra) and 12.9 (for macOS 10.14 Mojave). Starting with iOS 16 and the iPhone 14, the minimum OS requirement was raised to at least macOS 10.13 High Sierra.
- As of December 2024, iTunes is no longer able to create new Apple Accounts, but is still able to sign in to existing Apple Accounts that have been activated. This is because Apple has discontinued security questions & made two-factor authentication mandatory for activating iTunes & App Store functionality on a newly created account – a process that requires a device with at least iOS 13.4, iPadOS 13.4, macOS 10.15.4 or later.

=== Devices ===
Device	Minimum iTunes version	Minimum OS	Latest firmware
iPod Classic (1st generation)	2.0 (Mac)	9/10.1 (Mac)	1.5
Rio One	2.0.3 (Mac)	9/10.1 (Mac)	Unknown
iPod Classic (2nd generation)	2.0.4 (Mac); 4.2 (Win)	9/10.1 (Mac); 2000 (Win)	1.5
iPod Classic (3rd generation)	4.0 (Mac); 4.1 (Win)	10.1 (Mac); 2000 (Win)	2.3
iPod Mini (1st generation)	4.2	10.1 (Mac); 2000 (Win)	1.4.1
iPod Classic (4th generation)	4.6	10.1 (Mac); 2000 (Win)	3.1.1
AirPort Express	4.6	10.2 (Mac); 2000 (Win)	Unknown
iPod Photo	4.7	10.2 (Mac); 2000 (Win)	1.2.1
iPod Classic 4G (color display)	4.7	10.2 (Mac); 2000 (Win)	1.2.1
iPod Shuffle (1st generation)	4.7.1	10.2 (Mac); 2000 (Win)	1.1.5
iPod Mini (2nd generation)	4.7.1	10.2 (Mac); 2000 (Win)	1.4.1
ROKR E1	4.9	10.2 (Mac); 2000 (Win)	Unknown
iPod Nano (1st generation)	5.0	10.3 (Mac); 2000 (Win)	1.3.1
iPod Classic (5th generation)	6.0	10.3 (Mac); 2000 (Win)	1.3
SLVR L7	6.0.1	10.3 (Mac); 2000 (Win)	Unknown
RAZR V3i	6.0.1	10.3 (Mac); 2000 (Win)	Unknown
Nike+iPod	6.0.5	10.3 (Mac); 2000 (Win)	Unknown
iPod Classic 5.5G	7.0	10.3 (Mac); 2000 (Win)	1.3
iPod Shuffle (2nd generation)	7.0	10.3 (Mac); 2000 (Win)	1.0.4
iPod Nano (2nd generation)	7.0	10.3 (Mac); 2000 (Win)	1.1.3
Apple TV (1st generation)	7.1	10.3.9 (Mac); XP SP2 (Win)	3.0.2
iPhone (1st generation)	7.3	10.4.11 (Mac); XP SP2 (Win)	iPhone OS 3.1.3
iPod Touch (1st generation)	7.4	10.4.11 (Mac); XP SP2 (Win)	iPhone OS 3.1.3
iPod Classic (6th generation)	7.4	10.4.11 (Mac); XP SP2 (Win)	1.1.2
iPod Nano (3rd generation)	7.4	10.4.11 (Mac); XP SP2 (Win)	1.1.3
iPhone 3G	7.7	10.4.11 (Mac); XP SP2 (Win)	iOS 4.2.1
iPod Touch (2nd generation)	8.0	10.4.11 (Mac); XP SP2 (Win)	iOS 4.2.1
iPod Classic 6.5G	8.0	10.4.11 (Mac); XP SP3 (Win)	2.0.5
iPod Nano (4th generation)	8.0	10.4.11 (Mac); XP SP3 (Win)	1.0.4
iPod Shuffle (3rd generation)	8.1	10.4.11 (Mac); XP SP3 (Win)	1.1
iPhone 3GS	8.2	10.4.11 (Mac); XP SP3 (Win)	iOS 6.1.6
iPod Touch (3rd generation)	9.0	10.4.11 (Mac); XP SP3 (Win)	iOS 5.1.1
iPod Nano (5th generation)	9.0	10.4.11 (Mac); XP SP3 (Win)	1.0.2
iPad (1st generation)	9.1	10.4.11 (Mac); XP SP3 (Win)	iOS 5.1.1
iPhone 4	9.2	10.4.11 (Mac); XP SP3 (Win)	iOS 7.1.2
iPod Shuffle (4th generation)	10.0	10.5.8 (Mac); XP SP3 (Win)	1.0.2
iPod Nano (6th generation)	10.0	10.5.8 (Mac); XP SP3 (Win)	1.2
iPod Touch (4th generation)	10.0	10.5.8 (Mac); XP SP3 (Win)	iOS 6.1.6
Apple TV (2nd generation)	10.0.1	10.5.8 (Mac); XP SP3 (Win)	6.2.1 (iOS 7.1.2)
iPhone 4 (CDMA)	10.1.2	10.5.8 (Mac); XP SP3 (Win)	iOS 7.1.2
iPad 2	10.2	10.5.8 (Mac); XP SP3 (Win)	iOS 9.3.5 (Note: Wi-Fi iPads and GSM iPad 2 only) iOS 9.3.6
iPhone 4S	10.5	10.5.8 (Mac); XP SP3 (Win)	iOS 9.3.5 iOS 9.3.6
iPad (3rd generation)	10.6	10.5.8 (Mac); XP SP3 (Win)	iOS 9.3.5 iOS 9.3.6
Apple TV (3rd generation)	10.6	10.5.8 (Mac); XP SP3 (Win)	7.9 (derived from iOS 8.4.1)
iPhone 5	10.7	10.6.8 (Mac); XP SP3 (Win)	iOS 10.3.4
iPod Touch (5th generation)	10.7	10.6.8 (Mac); XP SP3 (Win)	iOS 9.3.5
iPod Nano (7th generation)	10.7	10.6.8 (Mac); XP SP3 (Win)	1.0.4
iPad (4th generation)	10.7	10.6.8 (Mac); XP SP3 (Win)	iOS 10.3.3 iOS 10.3.4
iPad Mini (1st generation)	10.7	10.6.8 (Mac); XP SP3 (Win)	iOS 9.3.5 iOS 9.3.6
iPhone 5C	11.1	10.6.8 (Mac); XP SP3 (Win)	iOS 10.3.3
iPhone 5S	11.1	10.6.8 (Mac); XP SP3 (Win)	iOS 12.5.8
iPad Air (1st generation)	11.1.2	10.6.8 (Mac); XP SP3 (Win)	iOS 12.5.8
iPad Mini 2	11.1.2	10.6.8 (Mac); XP SP3 (Win)	iOS 12.5.8
iPhone 6 / 6 Plus	11.4	10.6.8 (Mac); XP SP3 (Win)	iOS 12.5.8
iPad Air 2	12.0.1	10.6.8 (Mac); XP SP3 (Win)	iOS 15.8.8
iPad Mini 3	12.0.1	10.6.8 (Mac); XP SP3 (Win)	iOS 12.5.8
iPod Nano (7.5G)	12.2 (Mac); 12.1.3 (Win)	10.7.5 (Mac); 7 SP1 (Win)	1.1.2
iPod Touch (6th generation)	12.2.1 (Mac); 12.1.3 (Win)	10.7.5 (Mac); 7 SP1 (Win)	iOS 12.5.8
iPhone 6S / 6S Plus	12.3 (Mac); 12.1.3 (Win)	10.7.5 (Mac); 7 SP1 (Win)	iOS 15.8.8
iPad Mini 4	12.3 (Mac); 12.1.3 (Win)	10.7.5 (Mac); 7 SP1 (Win)	iOS 15.8.8
iPad Pro (12.9-inch) (1st generation)	12.3.1	10.7.5 (Mac); 7 SP1 (Win)	iOS 16.7.16
iPad Pro (9.7-inch)	12.3.3	10.8.5 (Mac); 7 SP1 (Win)	iOS 16.7.16
iPhone SE (1st generation)	12.3.3	10.8.5 (Mac); 7 SP1 (Win)	iOS 15.8.8
iPad (5th generation)	12.3.3	10.8.5 (Mac); 7 SP1 (Win)	iOS 16.7.16
iPhone 7 / 7 Plus	12.5	10.9.5 (Mac); 7 SP1 (Win)	iOS 15.8.8
iPad Pro (12.9-inch) (2nd generation)	12.5	10.9.5 (Mac); 7 SP1 (Win)	iPadOS 17.7.11
iPad Pro (10.5-inch)	12.5	10.9.5 (Mac); 7 SP1 (Win)	iPadOS 17.7.11
iPhone 8 / 8 Plus	12.6.3 / 12.7	10.10.5 (Mac); 7 SP1 (Win)	iOS 16.7.16
iPhone X	12.6.3 / 12.7	10.10.5 (Mac); 7 SP1 (Win)	iOS 16.7.16
iPad (6th generation)	12.6.4 / 12.7.3	10.10.5 (Mac); 7 SP1 (Win)	iPadOS 17.7.11
iPhone XS / XS Max	12.6.5 / 12.8 (Mac); 12.6.5 / 12.9 (Win)	10.11.6 (Mac); 7 SP1 (Win)	iOS 18.7.12
iPhone XR	12.6.5 / 12.8 (Mac); 12.6.5 / 12.9 (Win)	10.11.6 (Mac); 7 SP1 (Win)	iOS 18.7.12
iPad Pro (12.9-inch) (3rd generation)	12.6.5 / 12.8 (Mac); 12.6.5 / 12.9 (Win)	10.11.6 (Mac); 7 SP1 (Win)	iPadOS 26.7.3
iPad Pro (11-inch)	12.6.5 / 12.8 (Mac); 12.6.5 / 12.9 (Win)	10.11.6 (Mac); 7 SP1 (Win)	iPadOS 26.7.3
iPad Air (3rd generation)	12.6.5 / 12.8 (Mac); 12.6.5 / 12.9 (Win)	10.11.6 (Mac); 7 SP1 (Win)	iPadOS 26.7.3
iPad Mini (5th generation)	12.6.5 / 12.8 (Mac); 12.6.5 / 12.9 (Win)	10.11.6 (Mac); 7 SP1 (Win)	iPadOS 26.7.3
iPod Touch (7th generation)	12.6.5 / 12.8 (Mac); 12.6.5 / 12.9 (Win)	10.11.6 (Mac); 7 SP1 (Win)	iOS 15.8.8
iPhone 11	12.8.2 (Mac); 12.10 (Win)	10.11.6 (Mac); 7 SP1 (Win)	iOS 27.2.1
iPhone 11 Pro / 11 Pro Max	12.8.2 (Mac); 12.10 (Win)	10.11.6 (Mac); 7 SP1 (Win)	iOS 27.2.1
iPad (7th generation)	12.8.2 (Mac); 12.10 (Win)	10.11.6 (Mac); 7 SP1 (Win)	iPadOS 18.7.12
iPad Pro (4th generation)	12.8.2 (Mac); 12.10 (Win)	10.11.6 (Mac); 7 SP1 (Win)	iOS 27.2.1
iPhone SE (2nd generation)	12.8.2 (Mac); 12.10 (Win)	10.11.6 (Mac); 7 SP1 (Win)	iOS 27.2.1
iPad (8th generation)	12.8.2 (Mac); 12.10 (Win)	10.11.6 (Mac); 7 SP1 (Win)	iOS 27.2.1
iPad Air (4th generation)	12.8.2 (Mac); 12.10 (Win)	10.11.6 (Mac); 7 SP1 (Win)	iOS 27.2.1
iPhone 12 / 12 Mini	12.8.2 (Mac); 12.10 (Win)	10.11.6 (Mac); 7 SP1 (Win)	iOS 27.2.1
iPhone 12 Pro / 12 Pro Max	12.8.2 (Mac); 12.10 (Win)	10.11.6 (Mac); 7 SP1 (Win)	iOS 27.2.1
iPad Pro (5th generation)	12.8.2 (Mac); 12.10 (Win)	10.11.6 (Mac); 7 SP1 (Win)	iOS 27.2.1
iPad (9th generation)	12.8.2 (Mac); 12.10 (Win)	10.11.6 (Mac); 7 SP1 (Win)	iOS 27.2.1
iPad Mini (6th generation)	12.8.2 (Mac); 12.12 (Win)	10.11.6 (Mac); 10 (Win)	iOS 27.2.1
iPad Air (5th generation)	12.8.2 (Mac); 12.12 (Win)	10.11.6 (Mac); 10 (Win)	iOS 27.2.1
iPad (10th generation)	12.8.2 (Mac); 12.12 (Win)	10.11.6 (Mac); 10 (Win)	iOS 27.2.1
iPad Pro (6th generation)	12.8.2 (Mac); 12.12 (Win)	10.11.6 (Mac); 10 (Win)	iOS 27.2.1
iPhone 13 / 13 Mini	12.8.2 (Mac); 12.10.10 (Win)	10.11.6 (Mac); 7 SP1 (Win)	iOS 27.2.1
iPhone 13 Pro / 13 Pro Max	12.8.2 (Mac); 12.10.10 (Win)	10.11.6 (Mac); 7 SP1 (Win)	iOS 27.2.1
iPhone SE (3rd generation)	12.8.2 (Mac); 12.10.10 (Win)	10.11.6 (Mac); 7 SP1 (Win)	iOS 27.2.1
iPhone 14 / 14 Plus	12.8.3 / 12.9 (Mac); 12.12.10 (Win)	10.13.6 (Mac); 10 (Win)	iOS 27.2.1
iPhone 14 Pro / 14 Pro Max	12.8.3 / 12.9 (Mac); 12.12.10 (Win)	10.13.6 (Mac); 10 (Win)	iOS 27.2.1
iPhone 15 / 15 Plus	12.8.3 / 12.9 (Mac); 12.12.10 (Win)	10.13.6 (Mac); 10 (Win)	iOS 27.2.1
iPhone 15 Pro / 15 Pro Max	12.8.3 / 12.9 (Mac); 12.12.10 (Win)	10.13.6 (Mac); 10 (Win)	iOS 27.2.1
iPad Air (6th generation)	12.8.3 / 12.9 (Mac); 12.12.10 (Win)	10.13.6 (Mac); 10 (Win)	iOS 27.2.1
iPad Pro (7th generation)	12.8.3 / 12.9 (Mac); 12.12.10 (Win)	10.13.6 (Mac); 10 (Win)	iOS 27.2.1
iPhone 16 / 16 Plus	12.8.3 / 12.9 (Mac); 12.12.10 (Win)	10.13.6 (Mac); 10 (Win)	iOS 27.2.1
iPhone 16 Pro / 16 Pro Max	12.8.3 / 12.9 (Mac); 12.12.10 (Win)	10.13.6 (Mac); 10 (Win)	iOS 27.2.1
iPad Mini (7th generation)	12.8.3 / 12.9 (Mac); 12.12.10 (Win)	10.13.6 (Mac); 10 (Win)	iOS 27.2.1
iPhone 16e	12.8.3 / 12.9 (Mac); 12.12.10 (Win)	10.13.6 (Mac); 10 (Win)	iOS 27.2.1
iPad (11th generation)	12.8.3 / 12.9 (Mac); 12.12.10 (Win)	10.13.6 (Mac); 10 (Win)	iOS 27.2.1
iPad Air (7th generation)	12.8.3 / 12.9 (Mac); 12.12.10 (Win)	10.13.6 (Mac); 10 (Win)	iOS 27.2.1
iPhone 17	12.8.3 / 12.9 (Mac); 12.12.10 (Win)	10.13.6 (Mac); 10 (Win)	iOS 27.2.1
iPhone Air	12.8.3 / 12.9 (Mac); 12.12.10 (Win)	10.13.6 (Mac); 10 (Win)	iOS 27.2.1
iPhone 17 Pro / 17 Pro Max	12.8.3 / 12.9 (Mac); 12.12.10 (Win)	10.13.6 (Mac); 10 (Win)	iOS 27.2.1
iPad Pro (8th generation)	12.8.3 / 12.9 (Mac); 12.12.10 (Win)	10.13.6 (Mac); 10 (Win)	iOS 27.2.1
iPhone 17e	12.8.3 / 12.9 (Mac); 12.12.10 (Win)	10.13.6 (Mac); 10 (Win)	iOS 27.2.1
iPad Air (8th generation)	12.8.3 / 12.9 (Mac); 12.12.10 (Win)	10.13.6 (Mac); 10 (Win)	iOS 27.2.1
iPhone 18 Pro / 18 Pro Max	12.8.3 / 12.9 (Mac); 12.12.10 (Win)	10.13.6 (Mac); 10 (Win)	iOS 27.2.1
IPhone Duo	12.8.3 / 12.9 (Mac); 12.12.10 (Win)	10.13.6 (Mac); 10 (Win)	iOS 27.2.1

== Version history ==
Legend:
Unsupported
Supported
Latest version
Preview version

=== iTunes 1 ===
iTunes 1 version history
Version	Release date	Release notes / Features
1.0	January 9, 2001	Original release based on SoundJam MP code.
1.1	February 21, 2001	External burners, improved visual effects, more supported CD burners. Initial Mac OS X version. Bundled with Mac OS X v10.0.
1.1.1	May 1, 2001	Burning CDs, full screen visual effects, stability/performance improvements, available in Dutch, French, German, Italian, Japanese, and Spanish.Last version to support Mac OS X 10.0.
1.1.2.0	September 25, 2001	Bundled with Mac OS X v10.1.

=== iTunes 2 ===
iTunes 2 version history
Version	Release date	Release notes / Features
2.0	October 23, 2001	iPod support, CD burning improvements, equalizer/cross-fader/sound enhancer added.
2.0.1	November 4, 2001	Fixes installer issue which may result in data loss. CD Burning updates.
2.0.2	November 16, 2001	Update German and French language support.
2.0.3	December 13, 2001	iPod synching improvements, support for Rio One MP3 player.
2.0.4	March 20, 2002	Improved stability/performance, expanded AppleScript support. Last version to support Mac OS 9.

=== iTunes 3 ===
iTunes 3 version history
Version	Release date	Release notes / Features
3.0	July 17, 2002	Smart playlists, more song list categories (including the My Rating column), Audible.com audiobook support.
3.0.1	September 18, 2002	Performance improvements, better Mac OS X v10.2 support.

=== iTunes 4 ===
iTunes 4 version history
Version	Release date	Release notes / Features
4.0	April 28, 2003	Music Store support, AAC audio codec, DVD burning, music sharing, GUI improvements.
4.0.1	May 27, 2003	Only allows music sharing on the local network.
4.1	October 16, 2003	Music store/CD burning improvements, Windows support added, voice notes, on-the-go playlists.
4.2	December 18, 2003	AOL accounts with music store, GUI changes.
4.5	April 28, 2004	iMix, party shuffle, CD insert printing, music store improvements, WMA to AAC conversion (Windows only), Apple Lossless audio codec.
4.6	June 9, 2004	AirTunes support.
4.7	October 27, 2004	Copying photos to iPod Photo, Windows taskbar minimizing.
4.7.1	January 11, 2005	iPod Shuffle support added, blocks DRM stripping applications, limited to 5 connections per day to networked music libraries. Last version to support Mac OS X 10.1. Bundled with Mac OS X v10.4 Tiger.
4.8	May 9, 2005	Video support, international music stores supported, security enhancements.
4.9	June 28, 2005	Podcasting, Motorola ROKR E1 mobile phone support added.

=== iTunes 5 ===
iTunes 5 version history
Version	Release date	Release notes / Features
5.0	September 7, 2005	GUI refined, search bar improvements, parental controls, playlist folders introduced, smart shuffle, iPod Nano support.
5.0.1	September 20, 2005	Bonjour for Windows removed from bundle after DNS conflict problems, bug fixes.

=== iTunes 6 ===
iTunes 6 version history
Version	Release date	Release notes / Features
6.0	October 12, 2005	GUI/music store changes, blocks DRM remover utilities, transfer videos to 5th generation iPod classic.
6.0.1	October 20, 2005	Bug fixes, Motorola SLVR L7 and RAZR V3i mobile phone support added.
6.0.2	January 10, 2006	Bug fixes, video conversion for home movies, AirTunes enhancements, iTunes MiniStore, now Universal binary (running on both Intel and PowerPC Macs).
6.0.3	February 15, 2006	Bug fixes
6.0.4	March 1, 2006	Stability and performance issues with Front Row.
6.0.4.2	March 3, 2006	Fixes possible playlist problems in 6.0.4.
6.0.5	June 29, 2006	Added Nike+iPod support and Nike Sport area on the iTunes Store. Last version to support Mac OS X 10.2 Jaguar.

=== iTunes 7 ===
iTunes 7 version history
Version	Release date	Release notes / Features
7.0	September 12, 2006	Video playback/purchasing improvements, iPod games, Major GUI changes, gapless playback and album, sync purchased content from iPod to computer, Cover Flow added.
7.0.1	September 27, 2006	Bug fixes for Cover Flow, CD importing, iPod synching, one-click rating, Remote Desktop Protocol and Windows Live Messenger.
7.0.2	October 31, 2006	Support for second generation shuffle and nano, fixed stability/performance issues with 7.0 and 7.0.1.
7.1	March 4, 2007	Apple TV support, additional 2G shuffle support, GUI improvements, fixes Windows Vista issues, enhanced sorting options, full-screen Cover Flow.
7.1.1	March 16, 2007	Minor update.
7.2	May 29, 2007	Adds iTunes Plus, which allows the user to purchase or upgrade songs to a high quality format.
7.3	June 29, 2007	Support for iPhone activation/synching, GUI changes/fixes. Changes sorting pattern.
7.3.1	July 11, 2007	Bug fixes.
7.3.2	August 2, 2007	Bug fixes. Last version to support Windows 2000.
7.4	September 6, 2007	Support for iPod Touch, Classic (6G), Nano (3G), adds a tagging feature for HD Radio and satellite radio and adds interface art for new iPod Shuffle colors. GUI improvements, Ended Support Windows 2000.
7.4.1	September 7, 2007	Blocks a workaround that allowed free ringtones. However, a new workaround was found within one day of release.
7.4.2	September 17, 2007	Bug fixes. Bundled with Mac OS X v10.5
7.4.3	September 27, 2007	Bug fix.
7.5	November 5, 2007	Allows activation of iPhones outside of the United States wherever activation is available, (e.g. United Kingdom and Germany) as well as security and stability fixes. Also included is a GUI update for Leopard, and the ability to add custom ringtones for free. Includes support for iPod game Phase. Shows iPod battery level in source list (iPod Nano 3G, iPod Classic, iPod Touch, and iPhone with 1.1.2 software). Last version to support Windows XP RTM and Service Pack 1 (32-bit).
7.6	January 15, 2008	Rent movies from the iTunes Store. Transfer Apple TV purchases to your computer. Allows manual management of music on iPhones. Added support for Windows Vista 64-bit.
7.6.1	February 21, 2008	Better compatibility with Apple TV "Take Two" (version 2.0)
7.6.2	April 2, 2008	Bug fixes.
7.7	July 10, 2008	Support for iPhone 3G, iOS 2.0 and the new App Store which features application downloads for the iPhone and iPod Touch as well as enabling the two products to act as remotes for wireless iTunes control.
7.7.1	July 31, 2008	Improved stability/performance. Last version to support Mac OS X 10.3 Panther.

=== iTunes 8 ===
iTunes 8 version history
Version	Release date	Release notes / Features
8.0	September 9, 2008	adds support for Genius Sidebar and playlists, Grid View, HD TV shows, Shows capacity of Apps on iPhone/iPod Touch on device summary tab, new default visualizer, more flexible podcast options and support for second generation iPod Touch and 4th generation iPod Nano.
8.0.1	October 2, 2008	part of iLife '09.
8.0.2	November 20, 2008	Adds support for iPhone OS 2.2.
8.1	March 11, 2009	Adds support for the iPod Shuffle
8.1.1	April 6, 2009	Bug fixes
8.2	June 1, 2009	Supports iPhone 3GS and iPhone OS 3.0.
8.2.1	July 15, 2009	Bug fixes. Addresses an issue with verification of Apple devices. The latter refers to the disabling of iTunes' ability to sync with the Palm Pre; the Pre has a feature called "MediaSync" which allowed version 8.2 to register and sync songs and videos between iTunes and the Pre. This functionality has since been restored with the latest version of webOS. This is the last version that fully supports Macs with a G3 processor.

=== iTunes 9 ===
iTunes 9 version history
Version	Release date	Release notes / Features
9.0	September 9, 2009	New UI and redevelopment of the iTunes Store using WebKit. Genius Mixes were added, as were Home Sharing, iTunes LPs and iTunes Extras. Support for activation/syncing of iPod Touch (late 2009). Music is automatically added to the library from a watched folder. The shopping cart in the Store has been removed, replaced by a "Wish List." Some compatibility issues with the iPod Classic.
9.0.1	September 22, 2009	Bug fixes
9.0.2	October 29, 2009	Supports Apple TV software version 3.0, supports dark mode in Grid View.
9.0.3	February 1, 2010	Bug fixes.
9.1	March 30, 2010	Adds support for iPad, adds the ability to sync downloaded books between iPad and the iTunes library, and Genius Mixes can now be renamed, rearranged, or removed. "Applications" are renamed "Apps".
9.1.1	April 27, 2010	Fixes issues with VoiceOver, Genius Mixes, song conversions to 128 kbit/s AAC while syncing, and conflicts with some third-party software which may cause iTunes for Windows to crash. Last version to support PowerPC G3.
9.2	June 16, 2010	Added ability to sync with iPhone 4. Also added ability to sync and read books with iPhone or iPod Touch with iOS 4 and iBooks 1.1. Added ability to organize and sync PDF documents as books, and to read PDFs with iBooks 1.1 on iPad and any iPhone or iPod Touch with iOS 4. Added option to organize your apps on iOS 4 home screens into folders using iTunes. Speed up back-ups while syncing an iPhone or iPod Touch with iOS 4. Album artwork improvements make artwork appear more quickly when exploring your library.
9.2.1	July 19, 2010	Bug fixes.Last version to support Mac OS X Tiger 10.4 on PowerPC G4, G5, and Intel Mac.

=== iTunes 10 ===
iTunes 10 version history
Version	Release date	Release notes / Features
10.0	September 1, 2010	Adds new social networking layer named "Ping". Adds support for fourth generation iPod Shuffle, sixth generation iPod Nano, fourth generation iPod Touch, and Apple TV (late 2010). AirTunes renamed to AirPlay. Adds support for VoiceOver Kit for iPod. Break compatibility with iTunes Server found on many NAS. New application icon.
10.0.1	September 24, 2010	Replace Genius sidebar with Ping sidebar. Bug fixes. Restore recognition of iTunes Server found on NAS Server.
10.1	November 12, 2010	Bug fixes. Streaming to AirTunes speakers working again. Adds Twitter connectivity to Ping. Adds printing support and support for devices running iOS 4.2.
10.1.1	December 15, 2010	Fixes playback, sync issues, and crash when connecting an iPod to a PowerPC Mac.
10.1.2	January 27, 2011	Adds support for CDMA iPhone 4.
10.2	March 2, 2011	Adds support for iPad 2, and iOS 4.3. Improves Home Sharing, allowing browsing and playback of entire iTunes libraries on devices running iOS 4.3, and brings back the colored icons in the Preferences window.
10.2.1	March 8, 2011	No details about this update were released.
10.2.2	April 18, 2011	Fixes an issue with unresponsive iPad syncing. Fixes an issue with slow syncing of photos on iPhone, iPad, and iPod Touch. Fixes an issue with video previews skipping while playing on the iTunes Store.
10.3	June 6, 2011	Adds support for iTunes in the Cloud (beta), allowing automatic downloading of purchased content between iTunes and iOS devices, and downloading previously purchased music. Adds support for iBookstore on the iTunes Store.
10.3.1	June 7, 2011	Fixes iOS device syncing bug.
10.4	July 20, 2011	Adds support for Mac OS X Lion. It now allows users to take advantage of the Full-Screen App capability. GUI slightly improved. Better integration with Windows Vista and Windows 7 (Aero effects support). Many Windows users originally experienced problems with the iCloud purchased music feature on the iTunes Store soon after this update.
10.4.1	August 22, 2011	Fixes a problem where the media keys on non-Apple keyboards work inconsistently. Addresses issues with adding artwork to songs and videos. Resolves an issue which causes unresponsiveness when purchasing an HD movie. Fixes a problem where iTunes takes longer to open after waking the computer from sleep. Addresses issues with VoiceOver support.
10.5	October 11, 2011	Adds support for iPhone 4S, iCloud, iTunes in the Cloud, Wi-Fi Syncing, and iOS 5. QuickTime for Windows no longer bundled in the iTunes installer. Many users have had issues with MP3 playback on computers with processors that lack SSE2 instructions. Because of an oversight, the help wasn't originally available in this version.
10.5.1	November 14, 2011	Adds support for iTunes Match
10.5.2	December 12, 2011	Improves iTunes Match. Fixes an audio distortion problem when playing or importing CDs.
10.5.3	January 19, 2012	Adds support for syncing textbooks with iBooks 2.
10.6	March 7, 2012	Adds support for iPad (3rd generation). Adds the ability to play 1080p HD movies and TV shows from the iTunes Store. Higher bit rate songs can be converted to 128, 196, or 256 kbit/s when syncing to iOS devices or iPods. Improvements for iTunes Match.
10.6.1	March 28, 2012	Fixes possible crash when playing videos, changing artwork size in grid view, or at syncing photos to devices. Addresses issues with VoiceOver and WindowEyes. Fixes problems with iPod nano and iPod shuffle. Resolves an ordering problem with Apple TV.
10.6.3	June 11, 2012	Includes support for OS X Mountain Lion. Last version of iTunes to support Mac computers with Mac OS X 10.5.8 Leopard or any PowerPC processors.
10.7	September 12, 2012	Support for iOS 6, iPhone 5, fourth-gen iPad, fifth-gen iPod Touch and seventh-gen iPod nano.

=== iTunes 11 ===
iTunes 11 version history
Version	Release date	Release notes / Features
11.0	November 29, 2012	Interface redesign, redesigned iTunes Store, iCloud purchases are now shown in the library, queue management support with a new "Up Next" button, redesigned MiniPlayer, iCloud syncs playback position of movies and TV shows.
11.0.1	December 13, 2012	Fixes bugs with purchases in iCloud, slow search, AirPlay, and returns the ability to display duplicate items within one's library.
11.0.2	February 19, 2013	Adds a new Composers view, improves responsiveness when syncing playlists with a large number of songs, and fixes an issue where purchases may not show up in your iTunes library.
11.0.3	May 16, 2013	MiniPlayer can show album art with the player controls hidden, and regains the removed "seek" bar. Adds album art to the songs view, combines multiple disc albums together as one album when in album view, changes to app update management, and improvements in search performance and sorting of large libraries.
11.0.4	June 5, 2013	Fixes a problem when switching between wired and wireless syncing which causes iTunes to quit and a problem relating to repeated iTunes store logins.
11.0.5	August 16, 2013	Fixes issue with iTunes in the Cloud.
11.1	September 18, 2013	Support for iOS 7. Adds Apple's new radio service, iTunes Radio.
11.1.1	October 2, 2013	Adds Windows 8.1 Support.
11.1.2	October 22, 2013	Added Hebrew and Arabic language support, support for OS X Mavericks. Mavericks users are forced to use iCloud to sync an iOS device's Contacts and Calendars with the desktop OS, as the "local sync" option in iTunes was removed.
11.1.3	November 6, 2013	Fixes a bug in the equalizer, slowness when switching views in large iTunes libraries, and fixes to Sound Check.
11.1.4	January 22, 2014	Wish List can be access from the main iTunes library, improved Arabic and Hebrew support. The Windows installer now packages iCloud, increasing the installer size by around just under 40 MB for the 32-bit and just under 50 MB for the 64-bit.
11.1.5	February 26, 2014	Fixes a crash that occurred when a device is connected, compatibility improvements with iBooks for Mac on OS X Mavericks. This is the last version available to Windows XP SP2 32-bit.
11.2	May 15, 2014	Released alongside a new version of OS X Mavericks, this release revamped the "Unplayed" tab and made it easier to find podcasts which have not yet been played. Podcast episodes can be automatically saved locally and removed after being played. This version introduced an issue, which was quickly fixed, where the /Users folder became hidden. The ability to locally sync an iOS device's Contacts and Calendar with iTunes on Mavericks was re-introduced together with OS X Mavericks version 10.9.3.
11.2.1	May 16, 2014	Fixes a problem that may cause the /Users directory to become hidden on OS X Mavericks.
11.2.2	May 28, 2014	Fixes a bug with podcast episodes downloading against users' wishes
11.3	July 10, 2014	New iTunes Extras (behind the scenes, galleries, director commentary) for HD movies
11.3.1	August 8, 2014	Addresses a problem where subscribed podcasts may stop updating with new episodes, and where iTunes may hang while browsing podcasts episodes.
11.4	September 9, 2014	Adds support for devices running iOS 8. This is the last version to support Mac OS X 10.6.8 (Snow Leopard)

=== iTunes 12 ===
iTunes 12 version history
Version	Release date	Release notes / Features
12.0.1.26	October 16, 2014	Family Sharing feature for iTunes purchases, new interface, new Recently Added view, removed ability to play .m4v iTunes files in QuickTime
12.1	January 29, 2015	New Notification Center widget, now a 64-bit app on Windows
12.1.1.4	February 19, 2015	(Windows only) Bug fixes with stuttering audio playback, Outlook contacts and calendar sync with iOS, and screen readers
12.1.2.27	April 9, 2015	Adds the ability to sync with the Photos app
12.1.3.6	September 17, 2015	(Windows only) Adds support for iOS 9 for Windows XP and Vista, and this is last version to support for these versions of Windows
12.2.0.145	June 30, 2015	Apple Music support; Adds iTunes Connect; New "Love" rating system; New icon; Updated user interface; Support for Windows XP and Windows Vista dropped, though iTunes 12.1.3 can be installed from the iTunes downloads page.
12.2.1.16	July 13, 2015	Fixes bugs with iTunes Match and Beats 1
12.2.2.25	August 13, 2015	New Beats 1 banner showing the current song, followed Apple Music artists are now available in a list, iTunes Connect supports artists sharing text, photos, music, and videos. Last version to support Mac OS X 10.7 Lion
12.3.0.44	September 16, 2015	Adds support for iOS 9 and Windows 10. Fixes a bug with reordering songs in Up Next, radio stations not appearing in Recently Played, and songs 'loved' on iOS not appearing as 'loved' on iTunes
12.3.2.35	December 11, 2015	Adds the ability to view works, composers, and performers for some Classical music within Apple Music
12.3.3.17	March 21, 2016	Adds support for the 9.7-inch iPad Pro and the iPhone SE
12.4.0.119	May 16, 2016	Adds Back and Forward buttons for navigation between Library, Apple Music and iTunes Store; Adds Media Picker for easy switching between Music, Movies, TV shows and more; New ways to view Library with Sidebar
12.4.1.6	June 3, 2016	Bug fixes
12.4.2	July 18, 2016	Bug fix
12.4.3	August 1, 2016	Fixes bug with playlist syncing
12.4.3.1	August 2, 2016	Fixes bugs with screen readers and VoiceOver, and restores the option to Reset Plays: Last version to support OS X 10.8 Mountain Lion
12.5.1.21	September 13, 2016	Adds iOS 10 support; Adds Siri integration for macOS Sierra; Adds Picture-in-Picture support for macOS Sierra; Action menu changes to bring iTunes in line with iOS music app ("Add to Up Next" is now "Play Later"); Removes "Music" (main music library) as an option for "Show in Playlist" from the contextual menu
12.5.2.36	October 28, 2016	Bug fixes
12.5.3.17	October 31, 2016	Bug fixes. Removes the ability to refresh a podcast from within a playlist in album view
12.5.4.42	December 13, 2016	Adds support for the TV app on iOS and Apple TV
12.5.5.5	January 23, 2017	Several security fixes.
12.6.0.95	March 21, 2017	The first public release with iPad (5th generation) and APFS (iOS 10.3) support
12.6.0.100	March 21, 2017	Returns option to open a playlist in a new window
12.6.1.25	May 15, 2017	Bug fixes
12.6.2.20	July 19, 2017	Supports high DPI displays on Windows Last version to support OS X 10.9 Mavericks
12.6.3.6	September 22, 2017	Separate build to allow businesses and individuals to continue to manage apps using iTunes; Features removed in iTunes 12.7 are kept in this version; Adds iOS 11 support, as with iTunes 12.7; With the release of macOS High Sierra, iTunes is no longer given priority over media keys, rather they are confined to the current program
12.6.4.3	April 3, 2018	Adds iOS 11.3 compatibility; Updating devices from iOS 11.2.6 to 11.3 within the app is broken; Minimum version able to manage accounts & edit payment information (besides iTunes 12.7.5), as TLS 1.0 was discontinued.
12.6.5.3	September 12, 2018	Adds iOS 12 support, as with iTunes 12.9; Fixes a problem with iOS updates and version numbers; Last version to keep the built-in App Store browser (Still able to download apps, as of March 2026.)
12.7.0.166	September 12, 2017	Adds iOS 11 support; This update removes the built-in App Store browser; App Store URLs are no longer handled by iTunes; This update loses support for synchronization and streaming with the first generation Apple TV; This update removes synchronization of ringtones; This update removes local application management UI. Applications now need to be manually dragged and dropped onto a connected device to install.
12.7.1.14	October 31, 2017	Bug fixes
12.7.2.58	December 6, 2017	Bug fixes
12.7.2.60	January 9, 2018	Bug fixes
12.7.3.46	January 24, 2018	Bug fixes
12.7.4.76	March 29, 2018	Bug fixes
12.7.5.9	May 29, 2018	Bug fixes: Minimum version able to manage accounts & edit payment information (besides iTunes 12.6.4), as TLS 1.0 was discontinued.
12.8.0.150	July 9, 2018	On macOS, adds supports for multi-room audio and HomePod stereo pairs to AirPlay 2. AirPlay menu can be used to control the play queue.
12.8.1.3	February 5, 2019	macOS only (OS X 10.10), bug fixes. Last version to support OS X 10.10 Yosemite.
12.8.2.3	January 23, 2019	Fixes bug with third-party AirPlay speakers not working macOS only (OS X 10.11, macOS 10.12, 10.13) Last version to support OS X 10.11 El Capitan, macOS 10.12 Sierra.
12.8.3.1	April 26, 2021	Security update, macOS only (macOS 10.13) Last version to support macOS 10.13 High Sierra.
12.9.0.164	September 12, 2018	Adds iOS 12 support; New features for Apple Music subscribers; Initially only available for Windows (Build 167); released for macOS as part of macOS Mojave on September 24, 2018.
12.9.1.4	October 30, 2018	Security update: Windows only
12.9.2.5	December 5, 2018	Minor app and performance improvements; macOS only (included with macOS 10.14.2 and 10.14.3)
12.9.2.6	December 5, 2018	Security update Windows only
12.9.3.3	January 24, 2019	Security update, Windows only
12.9.4.94	March 25, 2019	Fits more music on the Browse tab. macOS only (included with macOS 10.14.4)
12.9.4.102	March 25, 2019	Fits more music on the Browse tab Security update Windows only
12.9.5.5	May 13, 2019	macOS only (included with macOS 10.14.5 and 10.14.6) Final macOS version.
12.9.5.7	May 28, 2019	
12.9.6.3	July 23, 2019	
12.10.0.7	September 11, 2019	Adds iOS 13 and iPadOS 13 support.
12.10.1.4	October 7, 2019	
12.10.2.3	October 30, 2019	
12.10.3.1	December 11, 2019	
12.10.4.2	January 28, 2020	
12.10.5.12	March 24, 2020	
12.10.6.2	April 16, 2020	
12.10.7.3	May 21, 2020	
12.10.8.5	July 30, 2020	Last version to bundle Apple Application Support
12.10.9.3	September 16, 2020	Adds iOS 14 and iPadOS 14 support.
12.10.10.2	October 21, 2020	
12.10.11.2	April 23, 2021	Last version to support Windows 7 and Windows 8.1
12.11.0.26	November 17, 2020	
12.11.3.17	April 22, 2021	
12.11.4.15	August 9, 2021	
12.12.0.6	September 20, 2021	Adds iOS 15 and iPadOS 15 support.
12.12.1.1	September 23, 2021	
12.12.2.2	October 29, 2021	
12.12.3.5	March 8, 2022	
12.12.4.1	May 18, 2022	
12.12.5.8	September 12, 2022	Adds iOS 16 and iPadOS 16 support.
12.12.6.1	October 24, 2022	
12.12.7.1	December 15, 2022	Final version to release before the beta launch of the Apple Music, Apple TV, and Apple Devices apps, intended to replace iTunes
12.12.8.2	March 29, 2023	
12.12.9.4	May 23, 2023	
12.12.10.1	September 13, 2023	Adds iOS 17 and iPadOS 17 support.
12.13.0.9	October 24, 2023	Added the ability to use Podcasts and Audiobooks with iTunes while the Apple Music and Apple TV apps are installed
12.13.1.3	December 15, 2023	
12.13.2.3	May 8, 2024	Adds support for iPad Air (M2) and iPad Pro (M4).
12.13.3.2	September 11, 2024	Adds iOS 18 and iPadOS 18 support.
12.13.4.4	October 21, 2024	Adds support for iPad Mini (A17 Pro).
12.13.5.3	February 18, 2025	Adds support for iPhone 16e.
12.13.6.1	March 5, 2025	Adds support for iPad (A16) and iPad Air (M3).
12.13.7.1	March 31, 2025	Adds support for iOS 18.4 and iPadOS 18.4
12.13.8.3	September 12, 2025	Adds iOS 26 and iPadOS 26 support. Adds support for iPhone 17, iPhone 17 Pro, iPhone Air.
12.13.9.1	October 15, 2025	Adds support for iPad Pro (M5).
12.13.10.3	March 4, 2026	Adds support for iPhone 17e and iPad Air (M4).
12.13.11.1	September 8, 2026	Adds iOS 27 and iPadOS 27 support.
12.13.12.3	October 28, 2026	Adds support for Apple HomeView and iPad mini (A20 Pro)

== See also ==
- iTunes
- iTunes Store
- iOS version history
- Safari version history
