= IPad Air (1st generation) =

2013 tablet computer by Apple

iPad Air

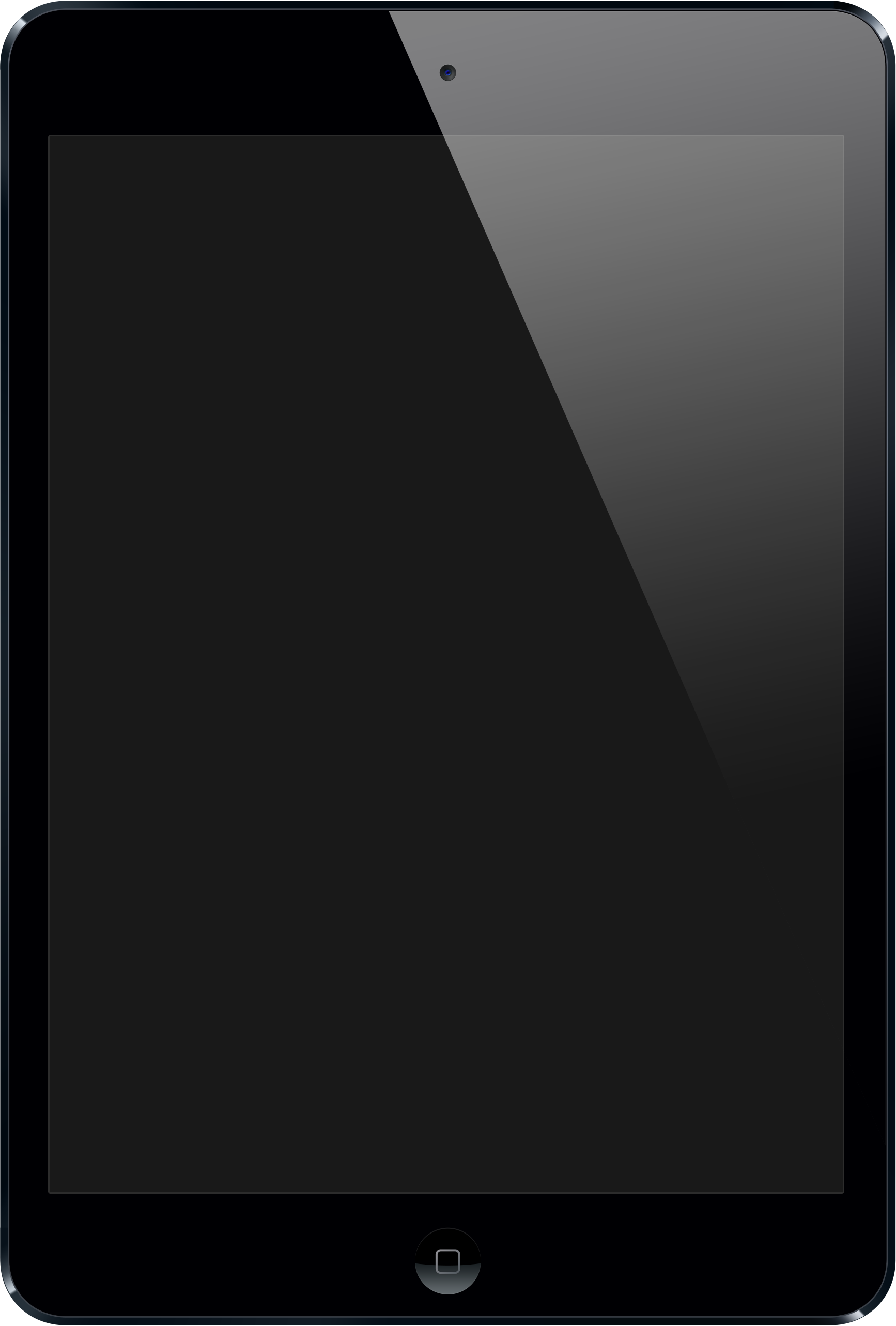
- iPad Air in Space Gray
- Developer: Apple Inc.
- Product family: iPad
- Type: Tablet computer
- Generation: 1st generation
- Released: November 1, 2013; 13 years ago
- Discontinued: 64 GB & 128 GB: October 16, 2014; 12 years ago 16 GB & 32 GB: March 21, 2016; 10 years ago
- Operating system: Original: iOS 7 Last: iOS 12.5.8
- System on a chip: Apple A7 with 64-bit architecture and Apple M7 motion co-processor
- CPU: 1.4 GHz dual-core 64-bit
- Memory: 1 GB LPDDR3 RAM
- Storage: 16, 32, 64, 128 GB (Note: 1 GB = 1 billion bytes, 1 TB = 1 trillion bytes) flash memory
- Display: 9.7 inches (250 mm) 2,048 × 1,536 px color IPS display, (264 ppi) with a 4:3 aspect ratio, oleophobic coating
- Graphics: PowerVR G6430
- Sound: Stereo
- Input: Multi-touch screen, headset controls, M7 motion co-processor, proximity and ambient light sensors, 3-axis accelerometer, 3-axis gyroscope, digital compass, dual microphone
- Camera: Front: 1.2 MP, 720p HD; Rear: OmniVision Technologies OV5650 5.0 MP AF, iSight with Five Element Lens, Hybrid IR filter, video stabilisation, face detection, HDR, ƒ/2.4 aperture
- Connectivity: Wi-Fi and Wi-Fi + Cellular: Wi-Fi 802.11 a/b/g/n at 2.4 GHz and 5 GHz and MIMO Bluetooth 4.0 Wi-Fi + Cellular: GPS & GLONASS GSM UMTS / HSDPA 850, 1700, 1900, 2100 MHz GSM / EDGE 850, 900, 1800, 1900 MHz CDMA CDMA/EV-DO Rev. A and B. 800, 1900 MHz LTE Multiple bands A1475: 1, 2, 3, 4, 5, 7, 8, 13, 17, 18, 19, 20, 25, 26; A1476: 1, 2, 3, 5, 7, 8, 18, 19, 20 and TD-LTE 38, 39, 40
- Power: Built-in rechargeable Li-Po battery 8,827 mAh 3.73 V 32.9 W⋅h (118 kJ)
- Online services: App Store, iTunes Store, iBookstore, iCloud, Game Center
- Dimensions: 240 mm (9.4 in) (h); 169.5 mm (6.67 in) (w); 7.5 mm (0.30 in) (d)
- Weight: Wi-Fi: 469 g (1.034 lb); Wi-Fi + Cellular: 478 g (1.054 lb)
- Predecessor: iPad (4th generation)
- Successor: iPad Air 2
- Related: iPad Mini 2
- Website: Apple - iPad Air at the Wayback Machine (archived December 14, 2013)

The iPad Air (retrospectively referred to unofficially as the iPad Air 1 or original iPad Air) is a tablet computer developed and marketed by Apple Inc. It was announced on October 22, 2013 and released on November 1, 2013. Part of the iPad line of tablet computers, the iPad Air features a thinner design than its predecessors (particularly the iPad (4th generation)), with similarities to the contemporaneous iPad Mini 2.

The iPad Air's successor, the iPad Air 2, was announced on October 16, 2014, and released on October 22, 2014, however, the 64 GB and 128 GB variants were discontinued, and later the 16 GB and 32 GB on March 21, 2016, after the announcement of the 9.7-inch iPad Pro.

== Features ==
=== Operating system and software ===
The iPad Air launched with iOS 7, introducing a major aesthetic redesign of the operating system, departing from skeuomorphic elements from iOS 6, such as green felt in Game Center, wood in Newsstand, and leather in Calendar, in favor of flat, colorful design. Jonathan Ive, the designer of iOS 7's new elements, described the update as "bringing order to complexity", highlighting features such as refined typography, new icons, translucency, layering, physics, and gyroscope-driven parallaxing as some of the major changes.

It can act as a hotspot with some carriers, sharing its Internet connection over Wi-Fi, Bluetooth, or USB, and also access the Apple App Store, a digital application distribution platform for iOS.

The iPad Air comes with several applications, including the Safari web browser, Mail, Photos, Video, Music, iTunes Store, App Store, Maps, Notes, Calendar, Game Center, Photo Booth, and Contacts. The iPad Air can optionally sync content and other data with a Mac or Windows computer using iTunes. Although the tablet is not designed to make phone calls over a cellular network, users can use a headset or the built-in speakers and microphone to place phone calls over Wi-Fi or cellular using a VoIP application, such as Skype. The device has a dictation application. This enables users to speak and the iPad types what they say on the screen. An Internet connection is required, as the speech is processed by Apple servers. Apple also began including its iLife (iPhoto, iMovie, Garageband) and iWork (Pages, Keynote, Numbers) apps with the device.

iOS 8 was released in 2014, alongside iPad Mini 3 and iPhone 6. iOS 8 introduced a variety of new features, including Continuity and Health (Apple)

iOS 9 was released in 2015. A major focus for the iPad was the introduction of three new multitasking features The Air supported two of these features, called Slide Over and Picture in Picture. Slide Over allows a user to "slide" a second app in from the side of the screen in a smaller window, and have it display information alongside the initial app. Picture in Picture allows a user to watch a video in a small, resizable, moveable window while remaining in another app. The third feature, dubbed Split View (which allows the user to run two apps simultaneously in a 50/50 view), was not supported by the device.

iOS 10 was released in 2016. iOS 10 brought new features, such as support for the AirPods.

iOS 11 was released in 2017. iOS 11 redesigned the control center, along with other new features.

Apple officially confirmed in June 2018 at WWDC that the iPad Air (1st generation) would get iOS 12, making it part of the second group of devices with six major iOS updates—from its original iOS 7 all the way to iOS 12.

In June 2019, Apple announced that it would drop support for the iPad Air with the release of iPadOS 13 in September 2019. The latest update for the iPad Air is iOS 12.5.8, released on January 26, 2026.

=== Design ===
The iPad Air marked the first major design change for the iPad since the iPad 2; it has a thinner design that is 7.5 millimeters thick and has a smaller screen bezel similar to the iPad Mini. Apple reduced the overall volume for the iPad Air by using thinner components resulting in a 22% reduction in weight over the iPad 2. It retains the same 9.7-inch screen as the previous iPad model. The new front-facing camera is capable of video in 720p HD, includes face detection, and backside illumination. The rear camera received an upgrade as well; now being called the iSight camera, in addition to the same functions as the front camera it also contains a 5 MP CMOS, hybrid IR filter and a fixed ƒ/2.4 aperture. The device was available in space gray and silver colors.

As with previous generations, Apple continued to use recyclable materials. The enclosure of the iPad Air was milled from a solid block of aluminum making it 100% recyclable. The iPad Air is also free of the harmful materials BFRs and PVC.

=== Hardware ===
Even though the first-generation iPad Air inherits most of its hardware from the iPhone 5S, including the Apple A7 system-on-chip with its Secure Enclave for enhanced security and the Apple M7 motion processor, it retains the same home button design as previous 9.7-inch iPads (iPad 2–4) and therefore, just like the second-generation iPad Mini, does not support Touch ID. The A7 present in the iPad Air is slightly different however, in that it does not use a PoP design which stacks the RAM on top of the SoC. It also features a metal heat spreader to compensate for the slightly faster clock speed and to provide better thermal management. The Air also includes a 5-megapixel rear-facing camera (iSight), a FaceTime HD front-facing camera, support for 802.11n, and an estimated 10 hours of battery life. It boots faster than any previous iPad model.

As with all previous generations of iPhone and iPad hardware, there are four buttons and one switch on the iPad Air. With the device in its portrait orientation, these are: a "home" button on the face of the device under the display that returns the user to the home screen, a wake/sleep button on the top edge of the device, and two buttons on the upper right side of the device performing volume up/down functions, under which is a switch whose function varies according to device settings, functioning either to switch the device into or out of silent mode or to lock/unlock the orientation of the screen. It uses the same home button that was built in previous iPad models and therefore does not include a fingerprint scanner.

In addition, the WiFi only version weighs 469 grams while the cellular model weighs 478 grams – over 25% lighter than their respective predecessors. The display responds to other sensors: an ambient light sensor to adjust screen brightness and a 3-axis accelerometer to sense orientation and switch between portrait and landscape modes. Unlike the iPhone and iPod Touch's built-in applications, which work in three orientations (portrait, landscape-left and landscape-right), the iPad's built-in applications support screen rotation in all four orientations, including upside-down. Consequently, the device has no intrinsic "native" orientation; only the relative position of the home button changes.

The iPad Air was available with 16, 32, 64 or 128 GB of internal flash memory, with no expansion option. Apple also sells a "camera connection kit" with an SD card reader, but it can only be used to transfer photos and videos. As of the announcement of the iPad Pro 9.7-Inch on March 21, 2016, the iPad Air was discontinued.

All models can connect to a wireless LAN and offer dual band Wi-Fi support. The tablet is also manufactured either with or without the capability to communicate over a cellular network. The iPad Air (and the iPad Mini 2) cellular model comes in two variants, both of which support nano-SIMs, quad-band GSM, penta-band UMTS, and dual-band CDMA EV-DO Rev. A and B. Additionally, one variant also supports LTE bands 1–5, 7, 8, 13, 17–20, 25 and 26 while the other variant supports LTE bands 1–3, 5, 7, 8, 18–20 and TD-LTE bands 38, 39 and 40. Apple's ability to handle many different bands in one device allowed it to offer, for the first time, a single iPad variant which supports all the cellular bands and technologies deployed by all the major North American wireless providers at the time of the device's introduction.

The audio playback of the iPad Air is in stereo with two speakers located on either side of the Lightning connector.

== Reception ==
=== Critical reception ===
The iPad Air received mainly positive reviews. Writing for AnandTech, Anand Lal Shimpi writes that the iPad Air "feels like a true successor to the iPad 4," praising it for its reduced weight and size. Shimpi further states that the Air "hits a balance of features, design and ergonomics that I don't think we've ever seen in the iPad." UK Editor-in-Chief of TechRadar, Patrick Goss, gave the iPad Air a positive review, giving praise to the A7 chip and camera upgrades, as well as the crisp and colorful display. He concludes by stating: "It's hard to put into words how much Apple has improved the iPad, offering a stunning level of detail and power with a build quality that's unrivalled." Christina Bonnington of Wired awarded the Air a rating of 8 out of 10, calling the performance "outstanding" and noting that high-definition video streams and gaming animations are "smooth and stutter free." She also praised the loading speeds of Safari, the web browser.

Bonnington criticized the speakers for being slightly muddled. Apple Inc. co-founder Steve Wozniak criticized the focus on decreasing size and weight rather than increasing storage space and stated that he did not want an iPad Air as it did not fit his personal needs. Dave Smith of the International Business Times wrote that while the device was nice, it did not bring anything new to the iPad. Smith strongly criticized the lack of a fingerprint reader, and noted that the updates, such as the increased speed and the decreased size and weight, were only slight improvements.

=== Commercial reception ===
The launch date for the iPad Air did not see as large of a turnout as usual for Apple products; however, this was expected by analysts due to the delayed release of the iPad Mini 2. The iPad Air sold out in Hong Kong just 2 hours after becoming available online.

== Other models ==
=== Support ===
| Legend: | Obsolete | Vintage | Unsupported | Discontinued | Current | Upcoming |

| Model | Announced | Released with | Release date | Discontinued | Final supported OS | Update lifespan | Support lifespan |
|---|---|---|---|---|---|---|---|
| iPad Air (1st generation) | October 22, 2013 | iOS 7.0.3 | November 1, 2013 | March 21, 2016 | iOS 12.5.8 | January 26, 2026 | 12 years, 2 months |
| iPad Air 2 | October 16, 2014 | iOS 8.1 | October 22, 2014 | March 21, 2017 | iPadOS 15.8.8 | May 11, 2026 | 10 years, 5 months |
| iPad Air (3rd generation) | March 18, 2019 | iOS 12.2 | March 18, 2019 | September 15, 2020 | iPadOS 26.7.3 | November 9, 2026 | 5 years, 10 months |
| iPad Air (4th generation) | September 15, 2020 | iPadOS 14.1 | October 23, 2020 | March 8, 2022 | iPadOS 27.2.1 | November 9, 2026 | 4 years, 4 months |
| iPad Air (5th generation) | March 8, 2022 | iPadOS 15.4 | March 18, 2022 | May 7, 2024 | iPadOS 27.2.1 | November 9, 2026 | 2 years, 10 months |
| iPad Air (M2) | May 7, 2024 | iPadOS 17.5 | May 15, 2024 | March 4, 2025 | iPadOS 27.2.1 | November 9, 2026 | 9 months |
| iPad Air (M3) | March 4, 2025 | iPadOS 18.3.1 | March 12, 2025 | March 2, 2026 | iPadOS 27.2.1 | November 9, 2026 | 11 months |
| iPad Air (M4) | March 2, 2026 | iPadOS 26 | March 11, 2026 | Current | iPadOS 27.2.1 | November 9, 2026 | 8 months |

| Models | iOS version | | | | | | iPadOS version | | | | | | |
| Models | 7 | 8 | 9 | 10 | 11 | 12 | 13 | 14 | 15 | 16 | 17 | 18 | 26 |
|---|---|---|---|---|---|---|---|---|---|---|---|---|---|
| 1st | 7.0.3 | Yes | Yes | Yes | Yes | Yes | No | No | No | No | No | No | No |
| 2 | —N/a | 8.1 | Yes | Yes | Yes | Yes | Yes | Yes | Yes | No | No | No | No |
| 3rd | —N/a | —N/a | —N/a | —N/a | —N/a | 12.1.4 | Yes | Yes | Yes | Yes | Yes | Yes | Yes |
| 4th | —N/a | —N/a | —N/a | —N/a | —N/a | —N/a | —N/a | 14.1 | Yes | Yes | Yes | Yes | Yes |
| 5th | —N/a | —N/a | —N/a | —N/a | —N/a | —N/a | —N/a | —N/a | 15.4 | Yes | Yes | Yes | Yes |
| 6th (M2) | —N/a | —N/a | —N/a | —N/a | —N/a | —N/a | —N/a | —N/a | —N/a | —N/a | 17.5 | Yes | Yes |
| 7th (M3) | —N/a | —N/a | —N/a | —N/a | —N/a | —N/a | —N/a | —N/a | —N/a | —N/a | —N/a | 18.3.1 | Yes |
| 8th (M4) | —N/a | —N/a | —N/a | —N/a | —N/a | —N/a | —N/a | —N/a | —N/a | —N/a | —N/a | —N/a | 26.3 |

=== Models ===
| Model | | iPad Air | iPad Air 2 | iPad Air (3rd generation) | iPad Air (4th generation) | iPad Air (5th generation) | iPad Air (6th generation) | | iPad Air (7th generation) | | iPad Air (8th generation) | |
|---|---|---|---|---|---|---|---|---|---|---|---|---|
| OS | Initial | iOS 7.0.3 | iOS 8.1 | iOS 12.1.4 | iPad OS 14.1 | iPadOS 15.4 | iPadOS 17.5 | | iPadOS 18.3.1 | | iPadOS 26.3.1 | |
| OS | Highest supported | iOS 12.5.8 | iPadOS 15.8.3 | iPadOS 27.2.1 | | | | | | | | |
| Model number | | A1474 (Wi-Fi) A1475 (Wi-Fi + Cellular); A1476 (Wi-Fi + Cellular TD-LTE) | A1566 (Wi-Fi); A1567 (Wi-Fi + Cellular) | A2152 (Wi-Fi); A2123, A2153 (Wi-Fi + Cellular); A2154 (Wi-Fi + Cellular China) | A2316 (Wi-Fi); A2324, A2072 (Wi-Fi + Cellular); A2325 (Wi-Fi + Cellular China) | A2588 (Wi-Fi); A2589, A2591 (Wi-Fi + Cellular) | 11-inch: A2902 (Wi-Fi) A2903 (Wi-Fi + Cellular) A2904 (Wi-Fi + Cellular China) | 13-inch: A2898 (Wi-Fi) A2899 (Wi-Fi + Cellular) A2900 (Wi-Fi + Cellular China) | 11-inch: A3266 (Wi-Fi) A3267 (Wi-Fi + Cellular) A3270 (Wi-Fi + Cellular China) | 13-inch: A3268 (Wi-Fi) A3269 (Wi-Fi + Cellular) A3271 (Wi-Fi + Cellular China) | 11-inch: A3459 (Wi-Fi) A3460 (Wi-Fi + Cellular) A3463 (Wi-Fi + Cellular China) | 13-inch: A3461 (Wi-Fi) A3462 (Wi-Fi + Cellular) A3464 (Wi-Fi + Cellular China) |
| Model identifier(s) | | iPad4,1 (Wi-Fi) iPad4,2 (Wi-Fi + Cellular) iPad4,3 (Wi-Fi + Cellular TD-LTE) | iPad5,3 (Wi-Fi) iPad5,4 (Wi-Fi + Cellular) | iPad11,3 (Wi-Fi) iPad11,4 (Wi-Fi + Cellular (All regions)) | iPad13,1 (Wi-Fi) iPad13,2 (Wi-Fi + Cellular (All regions)) | iPad13,3 (Wi-Fi) iPad13,4 (Wi-Fi + Cellular (All regions)) | iPad14,8 (Wi-Fi) iPad14,9 (Wi-Fi + Cellular (All regions)) | iPad14,10 (Wi-Fi) iPad14,11 (Wi-Fi + Cellular (All regions)) | iPad15,3 (Wi-Fi) iPad15,4 (Wi-Fi + Cellular (All regions)) | iPad15,5 (Wi-Fi) iPad15,6 (Wi-Fi + Cellular (All regions)) | iPad16,3 (Wi-Fi) iPad16,4 (Wi-Fi + Cellular (All regions)) | iPad16,5 (Wi-Fi) iPad16,6 (Wi-Fi + Cellular (All regions)) |
| Announcement date | | October 22, 2013 | October 16, 2014 | March 18, 2019 | September 15, 2020 | March 8, 2022 | May 7, 2024 | | March 4, 2025 | | March 2, 2026 | |
| Release date | | November 1, 2013 | 16, 64, 128 GB: October 22, 2014; 32 GB and 128 GB re-released: September 7, 2016 | March 18, 2019 | October 23, 2020 | March 18, 2022 | May 15, 2024 | | March 12, 2025 | | March 11, 2026 | |
| Discontinued | | 64, 128 GB: October 16, 2014; 16, 32 GB: March 21, 2016 | 128 GB: March 21, 2016; 16, 64 GB: September 7, 2016; 32, 128 GB (re-released): March 21, 2017 | September 15, 2020 | March 8, 2022 | May 7, 2024 | March 4, 2025 | | March 2, 2026 | | Current | |
| Launch price | | Wi-Fi models 16 GB $499; 32 GB $599; 64 GB $699; 128 GB $799 Wi-Fi + Cellular models 16 GB $629; 32 GB $729; 64 GB $829; 128 GB $929 | Wi-Fi models 16 GB $499; 64 GB $599; 128 GB $699 Wi-Fi + Cellular models 16 GB $629; 64 GB $729; 128 GB $829 | Wi-Fi models 64 GB $499; 256 GB $649 Wi-Fi + Cellular models 64 GB $629; 256 GB $779 | Wi-Fi models 64 GB $599; 256 GB $749 Wi-Fi + Cellular models 64 GB $729; 256 GB $879 | Wi-Fi models 64 GB $599; 256 GB $749 Wi-Fi + Cellular models 64 GB $729; 256 GB $879 | Wi-Fi models 128 GB $599; 256 GB $699; 512 GB $899; 1 TB $1099 Wi-Fi + Cellular models 128 GB $749; 256 GB $849; 512 GB $1049; 1 TB $1249 | Wi-Fi models 128 GB $799; 256 GB $899; 512 GB $1099; 1 TB $1299 Wi-Fi + Cellular models 128 GB $949; 256 GB $1049; 512 GB $1249; 1 TB $1449 | Wi-Fi models 128 GB $599; 256 GB $699; 512 GB $899; 1 TB $1099 Wi-Fi + Cellular models 128 GB $749; 256 GB $849; 512 GB $1049; 1 TB $1249 | Wi-Fi models 128 GB $799; 256 GB $899; 512 GB $1099; 1 TB $1299 Wi-Fi + Cellular models 128 GB $949; 256 GB $1049; 512 GB $1249; 1 TB $1449 | Wi-Fi models 128 GB $599; 256 GB $699; 512 GB $899; 1 TB $1099 Wi-Fi + Cellular models 128 GB $749; 256 GB $849; 512 GB $1049; 1 TB $1249 | Wi-Fi models 128 GB $799; 256 GB $899; 512 GB $1099; 1 TB $1299 Wi-Fi + Cellular models 128 GB $949; 256 GB $1049; 512 GB $1249; 1 TB $1449 |
| SoC | Name | Apple A7 | Apple A8X | Apple A12 Bionic | Apple A14 Bionic | Apple M1 | Apple M2 | | Apple M3 | | Apple M4 | |
| SoC | Motion coprocessor | Apple M7 | Apple M8 | Apple A12 Bionic | Apple A14 Bionic | Apple M1 | Apple M2 | | Apple M3 | | Apple M4 | |
| SoC | CPU | 1.4 GHz dual-core Apple Cyclone | 1.5 GHz tri-core Apple Typhoon | 2.49 GHz 6-core (Dual-core Vortex + quad-core Tempest) | 3.10 GHz 6-core (Dual-core Firestorm + quad-core Icestorm) | 3.20 GHz 8-core (quad-core Firestorm + quad-core Icestorm) | 3.49 GHz (quad-core Avalanche) + 2.42 GHz (quad-core Blizzard) | | 4.05 GHz (quad-core performance) + 2.75 GHz (quad-core efficient) | | 4.10 Ghz (3 performance cores) + 2.75 Ghz (5 efficiency cores) | |
| SoC | GPU | Quad-core PowerVR G6430 | Octa-core PowerVR GXA6850 | Apple designed quad-core | | Apple designed octa-core | Apple designed octa-core | | Apple designed nona-core | | Apple designed nona-core | |
| SoC | Memory | 1 GB LPDDR3 RAM | 2 GB LPDDR3 RAM | 3 GB LPDDR4X RAM | 4 GB RAM | 8 GB RAM | 8 GB RAM | | 8 GB RAM | | 12 GB RAM | |
| Storage | | 16, 32, 64, or 128 GB | 16, 64, or 128 GB | 64 or 256 GB | | | 128, 256, 512 GB or 1 TB | | | | | |
| Display | | 9.7 inches (250 mm) with a 4:3 aspect ratio, multi-touch display with LED backlighting and a fingerprint and scratch-resistant coating | Additionally: Fully laminated display, Antireflective coating | 10.5 inches (270 mm), Additionally: Fully laminated display, Antireflective coating, Wide color display (P3), True Tone display | 10.9 inches (280 mm), Additionally: Fully laminated display, Antireflective coating, Wide color display (P3), True Tone display | | 11 inches (280 mm), Additionally: Fully laminated display, Antireflective coating, Wide color display (P3), True Tone display | 13 inches (330 mm), Additionally: Fully laminated display, Antireflective coating, Wide color display (P3), True Tone display | 11 inches (280mm), Additionally: Fully laminated display, Antireflective coating, Wide color display (P3), True Tone display | 13 inches (330 mm), Additionally: Fully laminated display, Antireflective coating, Wide color display (P3), True Tone display | 11 inches (280mm), Additionally: Fully laminated display, Antireflective coating, Wide color display (P3), True Tone display | 13 inches (330 mm), Additionally: Fully laminated display, Antireflective coating, Wide color display (P3), True Tone display |
| Display | | 2048×1536 pixels at 264 ppi (Retina Display) | | 2224×1668 pixels at 264 ppi (Retina Display) | 2360×1640 pixels at 264 ppi (Retina Display) | | | 2732×2048 pixels at 264 ppi (Liquid Retina Display) | 2360×1640 pixels at 264 ppi (Liquid Retina Display) | 2732×2048 pixels at 264 ppi (Liquid Retina Display) | 2360×1640 pixels at 264 ppi (Liquid Retina Display) | 2732×2048 pixels at 264 ppi (Liquid Retina Display) |
| Camera | Back | 5 MP, ƒ/2.4 still 1080p HD 30 fps and 5× digital zoom video | 8 MP, ƒ/2.4 still 1080p HD 30 fps and 3× digital zoom video | | 12 MP, ƒ/1.8 still 4K 24/25/30/60 fps, 1080p HD 25/30/60 fps | | | | | | | |
| Camera | Front | 1.2 MP, ƒ/2.2 still, 720p video | | 7 MP, ƒ/2.2 still, 1080p video | 7 MP, ƒ/2.2 still, 1080p video | 12 MP, ƒ/2.4 still, 1080p video | 12 MP, ƒ/2.0 still, 1080p video | | | | | |
| Wireless | Wi-Fi | Wi-Fi 4 | Wi-Fi 5 | | Wi-Fi 6 | | Wi-Fi 6E | | | | Wi-Fi 7 | |
| Wireless | Cellular | 3G transitional LTE on Cellular model | | | | 3G transitional LTE and 5G on Cellular model | | | | | | |
| Wireless | Bluetooth | Bluetooth 4.0 | Bluetooth 4.2 | Bluetooth 5.0 | | | Bluetooth 5.3 | | | | Bluetooth 6.0 | |
| Geolocation | Wi-Fi models | Wi-Fi, Apple location databases | Wi-Fi, Apple location databases, iBeacon microlocation | | | | | | | | | |
| Geolocation | Wi-Fi + cellular models | GLONASS/GNSS, Assisted GPS, Apple location databases, Cellular network | GLONASS/GNSS, Assisted GPS, Apple location databases, Cellular network, iBeacon microlocation | | | | | | | | | |
| Sensors | | Accelerometer, Ambient light sensor, Magnetometer, Gyroscope | Accelerometer, Ambient light sensor, Magnetometer, Gyroscope, Barometer | | | | | | | | | |
| Battery | | 3.73 V 32.9 Wh (8,820 mAh) | 3.76 V 27.62 Wh (7,340 mAh) | 30.2 Wh | 28.6 Wh | | 28.93 Wh | 36.59 Wh | 28.93 Wh | 36.59 Wh | 28.93 Wh | 36.59 Wh |
| Dimensions | Height | 238.8 mm (9.40 in) | | 250.7 mm (9.87 in) | 247.4 mm (9.74 in) | 247.6 mm (9.75 in) | 247.6 mm (9.75 in) | 280.6 mm (11.05 in) | 247.6 mm (9.75 in) | 280.6 mm (11.05 in) | 247.6 mm (9.75 in) | 280.6 mm (11.05 in) |
| Dimensions | Width | 167.6 mm (6.60 in) | | 174.0 mm (6.85 in) | 178.3 mm (7.02 in) | 178.4 mm (7.02 in) | 178.5 mm (7.03 in) | 214.9 mm (8.46 in) | 178.5 mm (7.03 in) | 214.9 mm (8.46 in) | 178.5 mm (7.03 in) | 214.9 mm (8.46 in) |
| Dimensions | Depth | 7.5 mm (0.30 in) | 6.1 mm (0.24 in) | | | | | | | | | |
| Weight | Wi-Fi models | 469 g (1.034 lb) | 437 g (0.963 lb) | 456 g (1.005 lb) | 458 g (1.010 lb) | 461 g (1.016 lb) | 462 g (1.019 lb) | 617 g (1.360 lb) | 460 g (1.014 lb) | 616 g (1.358 lb) | 460 g (1.014 lb) | 616 g (1.358 lb) |
| Weight | Wi-Fi + Cellular models | 478 g (1.054 lb) | 444 g (0.979 lb) | 464 g (1.023 lb) | 460 g (1.01 lb) | 462 g (1.019 lb) | 462 g (1.019 lb) | 618 g (1.362 lb) | 460 g (1.014 lb) | 617 g (1.360 lb) | 460 g (1.014 lb) | 617 g (1.360 lb) |
| Mechanical keys | | Home button; Sleep/Wake; Volume controls; Variable (mute sound and rotation lock) function switch | Home button with Touch ID; Sleep/Wake; Volume controls | Sleep/Wake with Touch ID; Volume controls | | | | | | | | |
| Connector | | Lightning Connector | | | USB-C | | | | | | | |
| Apple Pencil | | No | | 1st generation | 2nd generation | | Pro, USB-C | | | | | |
| Greenhouse gas emissions | | 210 kg CO_{2}e | 190 kg CO_{2}e | 86 kg CO_{2}e | 88 kg CO_{2}e | 80 kg CO_{2}e | 75 kg CO_{2}e | 91 kg CO_{2}e | 76 kg CO_{2}e | 89 kg CO_{2}e | TBD | TBD |

== Timeline ==
Timeline of iPad models
See also: List of Apple products

Source: Apple Newsroom Archive.

== Explanatory notes ==
| Preceded by iPad (4th generation) | iPad Air; 2013 | Succeeded by iPad Air 2 |
