= Tablo Publishing =

Company based in Melbourne, Australia

Tablo
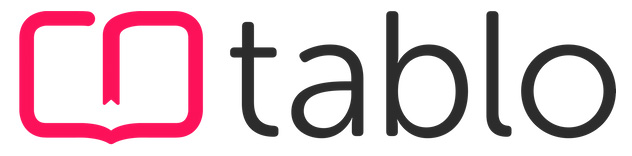
- Headquarters: Melbourne, Australia
- Key people: Ash Davies (CEO)
- Products: Self-publishing, eBooks, Paperback Books

Tablo Publishing is a self-publishing platform.

== History ==
Tablo was founded early in 2013 by Australian Ash Davies at age 19. Davies started the company after a challenging experience in publishing his own book.

The initial idea was accepted into the AngelCube startup accelerator in Melbourne, which invested $20,000 of capital into the company and incubated the startup for three months. Following the launch of its online book creation and publishing application late in 2013, Tablo secured an additional $400,000 in funding from a number of Australian and American angel investors, including Catch Of The Day CEO Paul Reining and Y Combinator partner Kevin Hale.

Tablo's original product was a browser-based application that allowed authors to create and self-publish eBooks to stores such as Amazon and the iBooks Store. Tablo relaunched as a social writing and reading community in July 2014.

In April 2018 Tablo introduced paperback publishing and expanded its distribution network via a print on demand service.
