= Athelas (typeface) =

- Category: Serif
- Designers: Veronika Burian; Jose Scaglione
- Foundry: TypeTogether
- Date released: 2008

Athelas is a serif typeface designed by Veronika Burian and Jose Scaglione and intended for use in body text. Released by their company TypeTogether in 2008, Burian and Scaglione described Athelas as inspired by British fine book printing. It is named after a healing herb in The Lord of the Rings.

Athelas is included as a system font in Apple's macOS operating system and as a default font in its Apple Books e-books application. It won joint first prize for best Latin-alphabet body text face at the Granshan International Type Design Competition in 2008. Cyrillic characters were later added to the font family, designed by Tom Grace, and monotonic Greek characters designed by Irene Vlachou.

In 2017, TypeTogether released an Arabic extension to Athelas. The new script extension was designed by Sahar Afshar, a type designer and researcher from Iran.
