= IPad Air (M3) =

2025 tablet computer by Apple

iPad Air (M3)

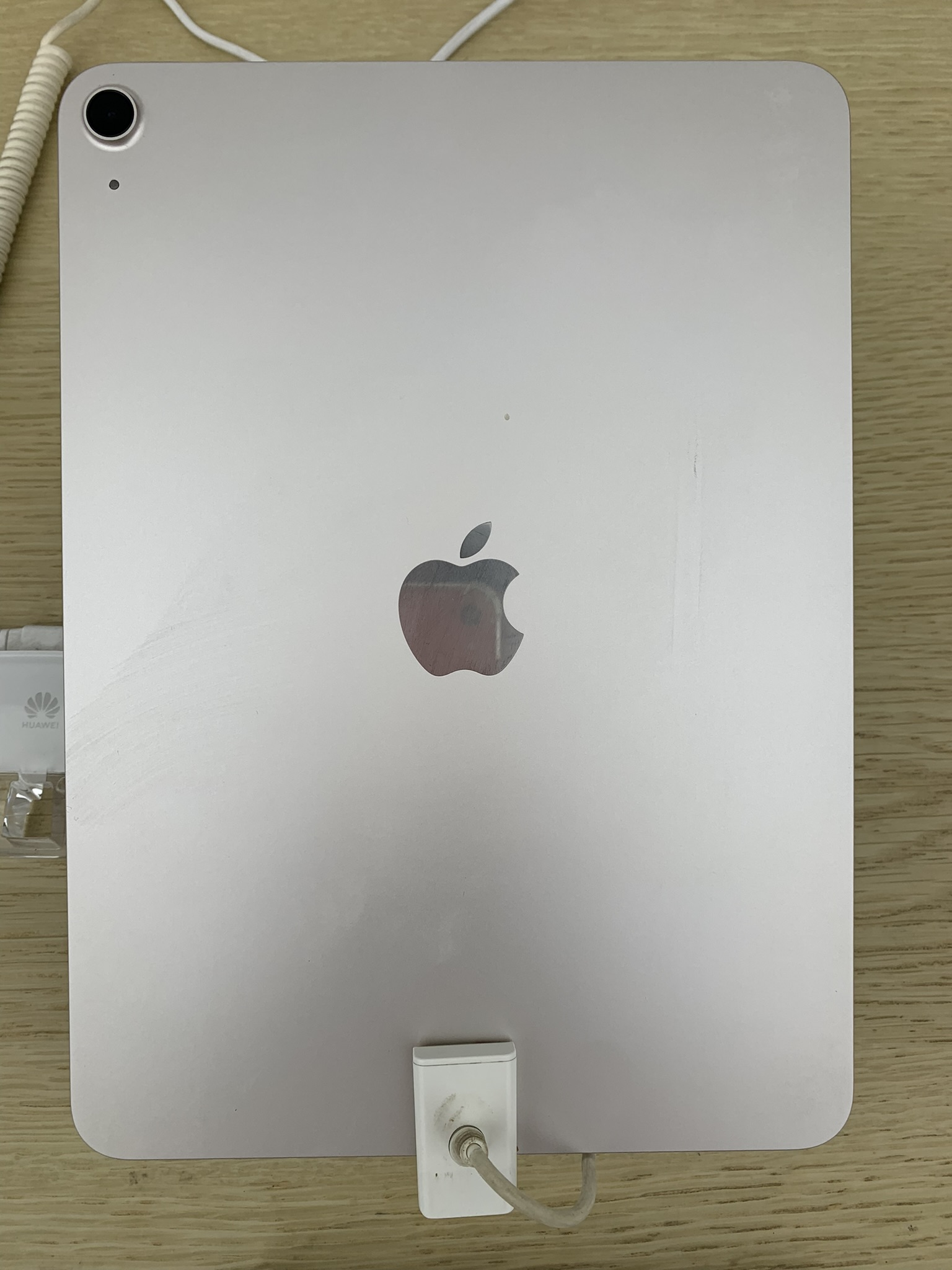
- 11" iPad Air M3 backside in Starlight
- Also known as: iPad Air (7th generation) iPad Air 7
- Developer: Apple Inc.
- Manufacturer: Foxconn
- Product family: iPad Air
- Type: Tablet computer
- Generation: 7th
- Released: March 12, 2025; 19 months ago
- Introductory price: $599 USD (11") / $799 USD (13")
- Discontinued: March 2, 2026; 8 months ago
- Operating system: Original: iPadOS 18.3.2 Current: iPadOS 27.2.1, released November 9, 2026
- System on a chip: Apple M3
- Memory: 8 GB
- Storage: 128 GB, 256 GB, 512 GB, 1 TB
- Display: 11 inches (280 mm) (2,360 x 1,640) px (264 ppi), 500-nits max brightness 13 inches (330 mm) (2,732 x 2,048) px (264 ppi), 600-nits max brightness Wide-color (P3), true tone, fully laminated display, with support for Apple Pencil Pro and Apple Pencil (USB-C)
- Camera: Front: 12 MP; Rear: 12 MP
- Connectivity: Wi-Fi 6E, Bluetooth 5.3, sub‑6 GHz 5G
- Power: 11": 28.9 watt-hour lithium-polymer battery 13": 36.6 watt-hour lithium-polymer battery
- Online services: App Store, iTunes Store, Books, iCloud, Game Center, Apple Arcade
- Weight: 11": 461 g (1.02 lbs); 13": 617 g (1.36 lbs)
- Predecessor: iPad Air (M2)
- Successor: iPad Air (M4)
- Website: apple.com/ipad-air

The seventh-generation iPad Air (commonly known as the iPad Air 7 or iPad Air (M3)) (Note: Officially referred to by Apple as the iPad Air 11-inch (M3) and the iPad Air 13-inch (M3)) is a series of tablet computers developed and marketed by Apple Inc. It was announced on March 4, 2025, and released on March 12, 2025. The device succeeds the iPad Air (M2) and introduces several hardware, performance, and accessory improvements while maintaining the same starting price as its predecessor. The iPad Air (M3) was discontinued on March 2, 2026 and succeeded by the iPad Air (M4).

== Features ==
=== Hardware and chip ===
The seventh-generation iPad Air is powered by Apple’s M3 chip. According to Apple, M3 offers up to 35 percent faster multithreaded CPU performance and up to 40 percent faster graphics than M1. Additionally, the M3 introduces hardware-accelerated ray tracing, mesh shading, and dynamic caching. This results in smoother, more realistic lighting, shadows, and reflections for demanding applications such as 3D rendering and high-end gaming. The M3’s Neural Engine is up to 60 percent faster than that of the M1, enabling improved AI and machine learning tasks within iPadOS.

The iPad Air (M3) continues to be offered an 11-inch and 13-inch variant. Like the previous generation, both sizes feature a Liquid Retina display with P3 wide color and True Tone technology. Storage options include 128 GB, 256 GB, 512 GB, and 1 TB, and all configurations are equipped with 8 GB of unified memory.

=== Operating system ===
The iPad Air (M3) ships with iPadOS 18, which brings a wide range of new features. It is designed to take advantage of Apple Intelligence. This includes new capabilities like Image Wand in the Notes app, the Clean Up tool in Photos, Genmoji for custom emoji creation, and more advanced Siri interactions. Siri now supports typed input, improved contextual awareness between requests, and built-in ChatGPT integration with privacy protections. Most Apple Intelligence features run directly on the device, but larger language models can also use Private Cloud Compute for additional processing without storing user data.

=== Connectivity ===
The iPad Air (M3) supports Wi‑Fi 6E for high-speed wireless networking and Bluetooth 5.3 for modern accessory pairing. Cellular models use the Qualcomm SDX70M modem, which is the same 5G modem found in the previous iPad Air (M2), the iPhone 15, and the iPad Pro (M4). This modem supports sub‑6 GHz 5G network.

=== Cameras ===
The device retains a 12-megapixel front-facing camera with Center Stage for video calls, and a 12-megapixel wide rear camera capable of capturing 4K video and high-resolution photos with Smart HDR 4.

=== Accessories ===
Alongside the new iPad Air, Apple introduced a redesigned Magic Keyboard branded specifically for the M3 model. Officially called the “Magic Keyboard for iPad Air (M3),” the accessory retains the familiar floating cantilever design but offers several refinements. The updated keyboard adds an improved viewing angle, a larger built-in trackpad for greater precision, and a new 14-key function row for quick access to controls like screen brightness and volume. To lower costs, Apple removed the backlit keys found on the previous generation. Despite these changes, the new keyboard is backwards compatible with all iPad Air models starting from the 4th generation. The new keyboard is priced at $269 for the 11-inch version and $319 for the 13-inch version, making it less expensive than the outgoing Magic Keyboard for iPad Air (M2), which was priced at $299 and $349, respectively. In October 2025, Apple released a black color option for the Magic Keyboard for iPad Air.

The iPad Air (M3) remains compatible with the Apple Pencil Pro and the Apple Pencil (USB-C).

== Timeline ==
Timeline of iPad models
See also: List of Apple products

Source: Apple Newsroom Archive.
