= IPad Air (M4) =

2026 tablet computer by Apple

iPad Air (M4)
- Also known as: iPad Air (8th generation) iPad Air 8
- Developer: Apple
- Manufacturer: Foxconn
- Product family: iPad Air
- Type: Tablet computer
- Generation: 8th
- Released: March 11, 2026; 7 months ago
- Introductory price: 11-inch: US$599; 13-inch: US$799 (Note: Prices for the 11-inch and 13-inch models were raised to $749 and $949 respectively on June 25, 2026.)
- Operating system: Original: iPadOS 26.3; Current: iPadOS 27.2, released October 26, 2026
- System on a chip: Apple M4
- Memory: 12 GB
- Storage: 128 GB, 256 GB, 512 GB, 1 TB
- Display: 11 inches (280 mm) (2,360 x 1,640) px (264 ppi), 500-nits max brightness 13 inches (330 mm) (2,732 x 2,048) px (264 ppi), 600-nits max brightness Wide-color (P3), true tone, fully laminated display, with support for Apple Pencil Pro and Apple Pencil (USB-C)
- Camera: Front: 12 MP; Rear: 12 MP
- Connectivity: Wi-Fi 7, Bluetooth 6, sub‑6 GHz 5G
- Online services: App Store, iTunes Store, Books, iCloud, Game Center, Apple Arcade
- Weight: 11-inch: 464 g (1.02 lb) (Wi-Fi); 465 g (1.03 lb) (Wi-Fi + Cellular); 13-inch 616 g (1.36 lb) (Wi-Fi); 617 g (1.36 lb) (Wi-Fi + Cellular)
- Predecessor: iPad Air (M3)
- Related: iPad Mini (A20 Pro)
- Website: apple.com/ipad-air

The eighth-generation iPad Air, marketed as the iPad Air (M4), is a series of tablet computers developed and marketed by Apple. It was announced on March 2, 2026, and released on March 11, 2026. The device succeeds the iPad Air (M3).

== Features ==
=== Hardware and chip ===
The eighth-generation iPad Air is powered by Apple's M4 chip. According to Apple, M4 offers up to 30 percent faster performance over the M3 chip and up to 2.3x faster than M1. It features Apple silicon connectivity N1 and C1X chips, delivering fast wireless and cellular connections with support for Wi-Fi 7.

The iPad Air (M4) continues to be offered in 11-inch and 13-inch variants. Like the previous generation, both sizes feature a Liquid Retina display with P3 wide color and True Tone technology. Storage options include 128 GB, 256 GB, 512 GB, and 1 TB, and all configurations are equipped with 12 GB of unified memory.

=== Operating system ===
The iPad Air (M4) ships with iPadOS 26, bringing a wide range of new features like the new Liquid Glass design language, a new optional windowing system, Preview, and support for Local Capture.

The iPad Air (M4) does not feature Apple-developed Face ID authentication method, as of 2026.

=== Connectivity ===
All iPad Air (M4) models use the Apple N1 chip which supports Wi‑Fi 7 for high-speed wireless networking and Bluetooth 6 for modern accessory pairing. Cellular models use the Apple C1X chip, delivering fast wireless and cellular connections.

The iPad Air (M4) still lacks Thunderbolt/USB4 data transfer capabilities.

=== Cameras ===
The device retains a 12-megapixel front-facing camera with Center Stage for video calls, and a 12-megapixel wide rear camera capable of capturing 4K video and high-resolution photos with Smart HDR 4.

Speakers

The iPad Air (M4) only provides for two speakers whilst having four speaker grills for design purposes, compared to the four studio-quality speakers in the Pro lineup.

=== Accessories ===
The iPad Air (M4) supports the same accessories as its predecessor, those being the Magic Keyboard for iPad Air, Apple Pencil (USB-C) and Apple Pencil Pro.

== Timeline ==
Timeline of iPad models
See also: List of Apple products

Source: Apple Newsroom Archive.
