= Apple Books =

E-book application by Apple

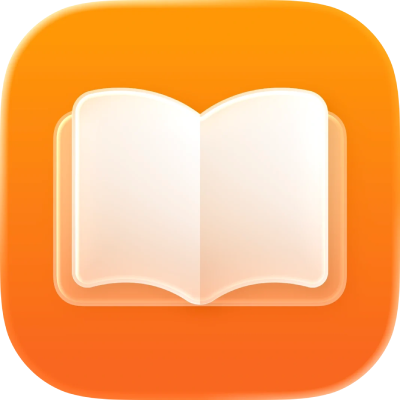

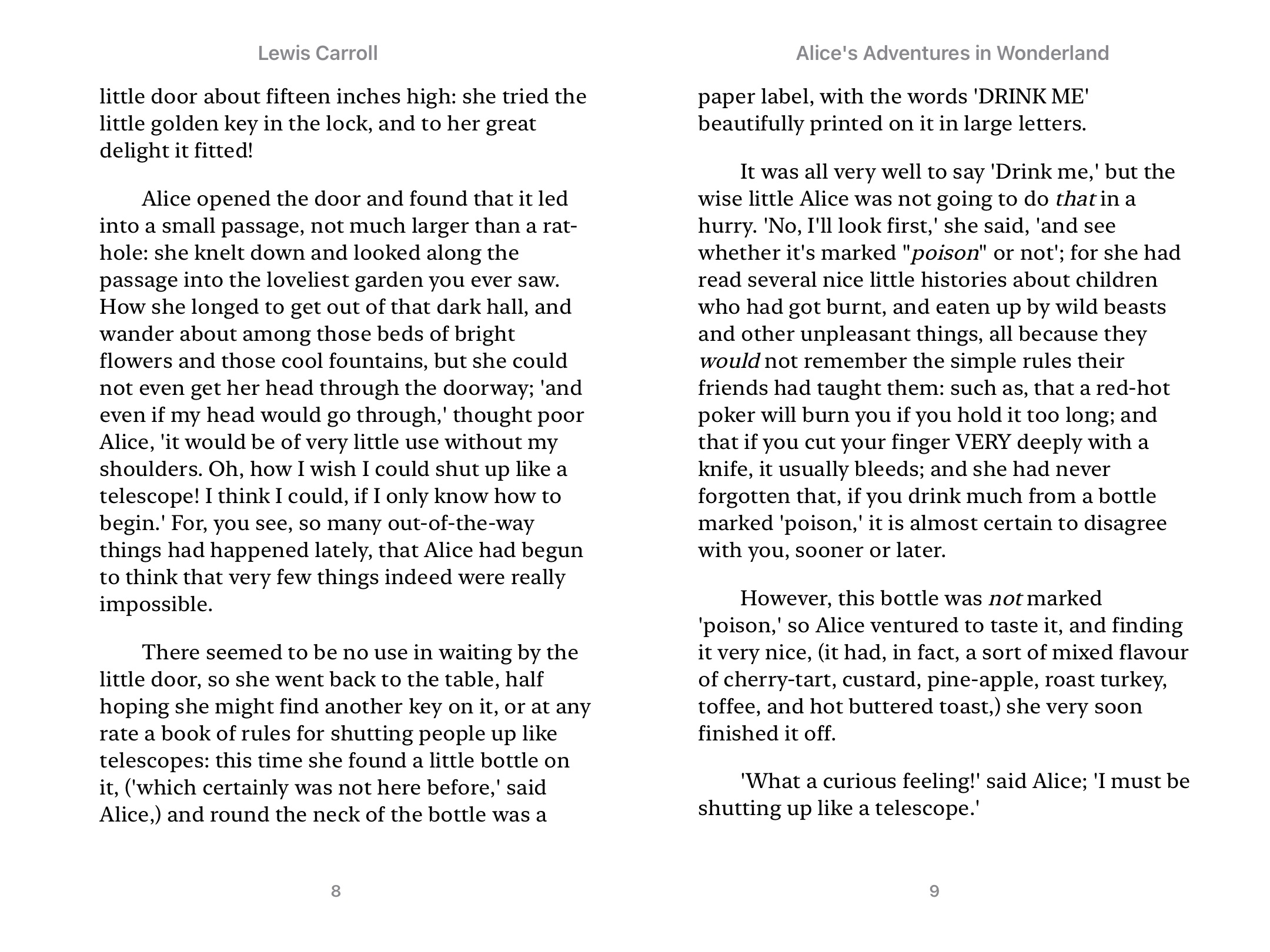
- An e-book displayed in Apple Books on iPad
- Developer: Apple
- Release: April 2, 2010; 16 years ago

Stable release(s)
- iOS: 4.2.3 / June 3, 2019; 7 years ago
- macOS: 5.2
- Written in: Objective-C
- Operating system: iPhone OS 3.2 and later; iPadOS; OS X Mavericks and later
- Size: 31 MB
- Available in: 33 languages
- List of languages English, Arabic, Catalan, Croatian, Czech, Danish, Dutch, Finnish, French, German, Greek, Hebrew, Hindi, Hungarian, Indonesian, Italian, Japanese, Korean, Malay, Norwegian Bokmål, Polish, Portuguese, Romanian, Russian, Simplified Chinese, Slovak, Spanish, Swedish, Thai, Traditional Chinese, Turkish, Ukrainian, Vietnamese
- Type: Digital distribution
- License: Proprietary
- Website: apple.com/apple-books

Apple Books (known as iBooks prior to iOS 12 and macOS Mojave) is an e-book reading and store application by Apple for its iOS, iPadOS and macOS operating systems and devices. It was announced as 'iBooks' in conjunction with the iPad on January 27, 2010, and released for the iPhone and iPod Touch in mid-2010, as part of the iOS 4 update.

Initially, iBooks was not pre-loaded onto iOS devices, but users could install it free of charge from the iTunes App Store. With the release of iOS 8, it became an integrated app. At Apple's 2013 Worldwide Developers Conference (WWDC), Craig Federighi announced that iBooks would also be provided with OS X Mavericks in Fall 2013.

It primarily receives EPUB content from the Apple Books store, but users can also add their own EPUB and PDF files via data synchronization with iTunes. Additionally, the files can be downloaded to Apple Books through Safari or Apple Mail. It is also capable of displaying e-books that incorporate multimedia. According to product information as of March 2010, iBooks will be able to "read the contents of any page [to the user]" using VoiceOver.

On January 19, 2012, at an education-focused special event in New York City, Apple announced the free release of iBooks 2, which can operate in landscape mode and allows for interactive reading. In addition, a new application, iBooks Author, was announced for the Mac App Store, allowing anyone to create interactive textbooks for reading in iBooks; and the iBooks Store was expanded with a textbook category. The iBooks Author Conference, an annual gathering of digital content creators around iBooks Author, convened between 2015 and 2017. Apple discontinued iBooks Author in 2020, its functionality having been integrated into Pages.

iBooks was renamed 'Apple Books' in September 2018. Since then, the app has featured a serif variation of Apple's 'San Francisco' typeface, named 'New York'.

== History ==
iBooks was announced alongside the iPad at a press conference in January 2010. The store itself, however, was released in America three days before the iPad with the introduction of iTunes 9.1. This was supposedly to prevent too much traffic on Apple's servers, as they have been overloaded with previous releases of the iPhone. On the day of its launch, on March 31, 2010, the iBooks Store collection comprised some 60,000 titles.

On April 8, 2010, Apple announced that iBooks would be updated to support the iPhone and iPod Touch with iOS 4. As a result, iBooks was not supported on first-generation iPhones and iPod Touches.

On June 8, 2010, at the WWDC Keynote, it was announced that iBooks would be updated that month to read PDF files as well as have the ability to annotate both PDFs and eBooks.

As of July 1, 2010, Apple expanded iBooks availability to Canada.

Upon its release for older devices running iOS 4, such as the iPhone 3GS and iPod Touch, iBooks received criticism for its slow performance. However, a July 19 update from Apple offered several improvements.

On September 27, 2011, Apple expanded the premium store to Ireland.

On January 19, 2012, Apple announced the release of iBooks 2, which supported interactive textbooks on the iPad; the release of iBooks 2 was accompanied by a new Mac app, iBooks Author.

On October 23, 2012, Apple announced iBooks 3.

On November 13, 2012, Apple was granted the patent "Display screen or portion thereof with animated graphical user interface" for page-turning animation. The page-turning animation was first filed for in December 2011 as ornamental design for a display screen. The patent's illustration shows three different images of a virtual page being turned. One with a corner of a page being turned slightly, the next image with the page halfway turned, and the third showing the page almost entirely turned over. The patent refers to O'Reilly Media and FlippingBook companies that use page-turning animation in eBooks.

On June 10, 2013, Apple announced iBooks for OS X Mavericks.

On October 24, 2013, Apple applied for a patent (since granted) for "Personalizing digital gifts", which describes a novel method for gifting e-books to friends. The patent describes how a user can select the appealing e-book snippet that will bring up a contextual menu containing an option to gift the media to another party.

On November 15, 2013, Apple pushed version 3.2 of iBooks for iOS with a redesigned interface to match the "flat" style of iOS 7, which dropped support for iOS 6 and earlier versions.

On the annual WWDC in 2014, Apple unveiled that iBooks will be a pre-installed app in the next version of the operating system, iOS 8, along with the Podcasts app.

On September 17, 2014, Apple bundled version 4.0 of iBooks for iOS with iOS 8.0. This includes slight changes with the bookstore button (into a persistent navigation bar at the bottom), grouping of books by series in the bookshelf, Auto-night mode theme, as well as small changes to the underlying rendering engine.

On October 20, 2014, Apple bundled version 4.1 of iBooks for iOS with iOS 8.1.

On January 24, 2018, Apple renamed iBooks to Books in the iOS 11.3 beta.

As well as in macOS 10.13.4 beta iBooks to Books on March 5, 2018. It was renamed back to iBooks in a next intermittent 10.13.4 macOS beta, showing some uncertainty about the marketing decision.

In early 2019, Apple renamed the app Apple Books.

On September 19, 2019, Apple included an Audiobooks app with watchOS 6 to play from the Apple Books Audiobook store.

=== Formats ===
The supported e-book formats of Apple Books are EPUB and PDF. As of version 2.0, it also supports a proprietary iBook format (IBA), generated with the iBooks Author tool. This format is based upon the EPUB format but depends on a custom widget code in the Apple Books app to function.

== Features ==
As of version 3, iBooks started to render text written in 18 different languages. Users of the application are able to change the font and text size displayed. Available English fonts are Baskerville, Cochin, Georgia, Palatino, Times New Roman, Verdana, Athelas, Charter, Iowan Old Style and Seravek. Version 5 removed Cochin and Baskerville.

Users can adjust screen brightness from within the application.

Words can be selected and searched throughout the book. Definitions of words can also be found upon clicking on the word and selecting 'define' which will give the reader a brief description of what the word means and if there isn't a definition available, the reader can opt to either search on Wikipedia or the web for a definition, an option available even if there is a definition for the word. Readers can also highlight passages and when this is done, the part of the Ebook which deals with the chapters and notes will automatically save the words or sentences which were highlighted, as well as revealing any notes made after highlighting a certain passage, another feature.

Originally, there were three viewing background themes to choose from, except when reading PDF documents. The themes were:

- Normal: black text on a white background
- Sepia: sepia text on an off-white background
- Night: light grey text on a black background

With the introduction of iOS 8 in 2014, an additional "Auto-Night Theme" was introduced, which dynamically changes the theme from 'Normal' or 'Sepia' to 'Night' and vice versa based on the ambient light conditions.

With the introduction of iOS 9 in 2015, a fourth background theme was added: Gray: light grey text on a dark gray background.

Apple Books also stacks books that belong to a series when the user is on the "All Books" screen. When selected, the books included in the series are shown in the order in which they were released, including books in the series that the user has not purchased. The prices of the unpurchased books are displayed on the upper right corner of the book "ear-marked" in green. Tapping the unpurchased book takes the user directly to the Apple Books store allowing for quick purchase.

There are three page layouts: Book, Full Screen, and Scroll. In Book or Full Screen layout, pages are turned by tapping or dragging the page, animated to imitate the appearance of a paper book. In Scroll, there is no page turning, and the book appears as continuous text, read vertically like a web browser.

Until May 2011 the Apple Books app (under name iBooks) included a free copy of Winnie-the-Pooh, the 1926 book by A. A. Milne, in order to get the user's library started.

In macOS Monterey, released in late 2021, Apple added a Cover tag to user-editable metadata tags for books, while removing other editable tags for Year, Category, Comments, and Description. This coincided with the Mac version of the app being ported from the iOS/iPadOS version using Catalyst.

== Apple Books Store ==
The Apple Books Store (formerly iBook Store) is an ePub content sales and delivery system that delivers eBooks to any iOS device such as the iPad, iPhone, and iPod Touch. It does not currently support either the downloading or reading of Apple Books directly on Windows or Linux distributions, but it does support the downloading and reading of Apple Books on OS X Mavericks and later.

Prior to the unveiling of the iPad, publishers Penguin Books, HarperCollins, Simon & Schuster, Macmillan Publishers, and Hachette Book Group USA committed to producing content for the Apple Books Store (under name iBooks Store). Additional publishers were invited to participate on the day of the product announcement, January 27, 2010. The Apple Books Store also provides access to the 30,000+ free books available from Project Gutenberg, and it provides content channeled through Draft2Digital or Smashwords, allowing independent authors and publishers to self-publish.

The day before the iPad event, Terry McGraw, the CEO of McGraw-Hill, appeared to divulge information to Erin Burnett on CNBC about the upcoming iPad release. This was quickly picked up and disseminated by rumor sites and eventually mainstream media outlets as revelation of features of the iPad. McGraw Hill was not included in the iPad presentation at the Apple media event and there was speculation that the exclusion was in response to this release of information. However, McGraw-Hill has stated that the information disclosed by McGraw was not privileged, and that the company had not intended to participate in the event.

In 2011, an Apple spokesperson announced that "We are now requiring that if an app offers customers the ability to purchase books outside of the app, that the same option is also available to customers from within the app with in-app purchase." Due to the 30% revenue share that Apple receives from the in-app purchase mechanism, the financial viability of competing bookstore apps run by other book retailers is uncertain, even though in many countries, the Apple Books Store still does not provide consumers access to any e-books except for free works, such as ones that are in the public domain. Apple's competitor Amazon.com updated its iOS Kindle app in July 2013 to bypass the 30% revenue share by requiring the user to purchase content using the Kindle Store's website instead of using the Kindle app; users can still get free e-books or samples while using the app.

== iBooks Author ==
iBooks Author

- Original author: Apple
- Release: January 19, 2012; 14 years ago
- Final release: 2.6.1 / September 24, 2018; 8 years ago
- Operating system: macOS
- Successor: Pages (word processor)

Steve Jobs told biographer Walter Isaacson that:

The process by which states certify textbooks is corrupt. But if we can make the textbooks free, and they come with the iPad, then they don't have to be certified. The crappy economy at the state level will last for a decade, and we can give them an opportunity to circumvent that whole process and save money.

— Steve Jobs

After Jobs's death, in 2012, Apple released iBooks 2, which added support for interactive textbooks on the iPad. These textbooks can display interactive diagrams, audio, video, quizzes, HTML, and 3D content, and support highlights, notes, and annotations, which can be viewed in an "index card"-like interface. Apple argued that these iPad textbooks would be more engaging for students than paper textbooks. Apple simultaneously released a free Mac app, iBooks Author, which could be used to create these interactive textbooks in WYSIWYG fashion. Apple's launch partners included education publishers Pearson, McGraw-Hill and Houghton Mifflin Harcourt, whose textbooks were available in a new Textbooks section of the iBookstore.

iBooks Author introduced two proprietary file formats:

- .iba files is its native file format, which can be opened and edited in iBooks Author. These files are zip archives disguised as Mac bundles, and store their data in an XML file.
- .ibooks is the format for exported iBooks Author documents, which can be opened by the iBooks app on iPhone, iPad and Mac. This format is a proprietary extension of EPUB3, and can only be read with the iBooks app on Apple devices.

TechRadar's Steve Paris called iBooks Author "incredibly simple to use", but noted a few bugs in the first public release, and criticized the fact that it only supported H.264 video files, despite iPads being compatible with more formats. Macworld called it an "impressive" tool, but said it was "constrained" by its exclusive compatibility with iPads. HyperCard author Bill Atkinson in 2017 praised iBooks Author as "the bee's knees", stating "I think it's the closest thing we have today to what HyperCard was", but with superior video and distribution tools.

iBooks Author's license agreement was controversial upon release, for stating that documents created with the tool could only be sold for a fee if they were accepted and exclusively distributed by Apple. Apple backtracked a few weeks later, in an updated license agreement. Its proprietary file format was also criticized by Ed Bott of ZDNet, who compared it to Microsoft's "embrace, extend, extinguish" strategy. In contrast, Serenity Caldwell of Macworld lauded iBooks Author's additional features over EPUB authoring software. Apple added support for EPUB export to iBooks Author in 2015, although textbooks exported in EPUB supported fewer features than iBooks textbooks.

Notable books created using iBooks Author include How to Say Cheese, Physics in Motion, NASA's Destination: Jupiter. E.O. Wilson's Life On Earth was also released for free as an interactive textbook.

Between 2015 and 2017, an annual iBooks Author Conference was held; Tidbits reports that some authors called the tool "best in class", with no equivalent on any other platform, but that Apple had "let the entire iBooks Author ecosystem stagnate". Author Denise Clifton reported that despite the iBooks Author version of her book being the "best and most advanced", it "sold fewer copies than any other" edition. The most downloaded interactive textbook on the iBooks Store was only downloaded 3,000 times in total, despite being free.

In 2020, Apple abandoned iBooks Author, and recommended that authors use Apple's Pages word processor instead. In the intervening years, Apple had built most of iBook Author's functionality into Pages, and the latter can export these books in standard EPUB format rather than the proprietary iBooks Author format. However, as of 2020, Pages only supported image galleries, videos, and audio, and lacked iBooks Author's more advanced features.

== Controversy ==
Some critics have stated that the Apple Books (under name iBooks) interface is a near-exact replica of Classics by Andrew Kaz and Phill Ryu, released over a year prior and even featured in Apple's own TV commercials. Apple has made no acknowledgment of this.

== Trademark dispute ==
In June 2011, Apple was sued by New York publisher John T. Colby over the use of the term "iBook". Colby claims to be the owner of a trademark on the term "ibooks" as applied to published books, after acquiring the assets of deceased publisher Byron Preiss, who had published a series of sci-fi and fantasy books under the term. Apple had previously used the term "iBook" to refer to a line of laptops that it sold until 2006, but Colby claims exclusive right to the term as applied to published books, including e-books. Apple began using the term "iBooks" in 2010 to refer to e-books sold for the iPad. Byron Preiss published more than 1,000 books under the "ibooks" brand starting in 1999. Apple emerged the victor in the suit. The judge stated: "They have offered no evidence that consumers who use Apple's iBooks software to download ebooks have come to believe that Apple has also entered the publishing business and is the publisher of all of the downloaded books, despite the fact that each book bears the imprint of its actual publisher."

== See also ==
- Google Play Books
- United States v. Apple Inc., a book price-fixing conspiracy, which also involved collusion between publishers and was also ruled illegal
