= IOS version history =

List of iOS operating system versions

iOS (formerly iPhone OS) is a mobile operating system developed by Apple Inc. and was first released in June 2007 alongside the first generation iPhone. iPhone OS was renamed iOS following the release of the iPad starting with iOS 4. With iOS 13, Apple began offering a separate operating system, iPadOS, for the iPad. iOS is also the foundation of watchOS and tvOS, and shares some of its code with macOS. New iOS versions are released yearly, alongside new iPhone models. From the launch of the iPhone in 2007 until the launch of iPhone 4 in 2010, this occurred in June or July; since then, new major versions are usually released in September, with the exception of iOS 5, which released in October 2011. Since the launch of the iPhone in June 2007, there have been twenty major versions of iOS, with the current major version being iOS 27 which was released on September 14, 2026.

== Overview ==
Overview of iOS versions
Version	Initial release date	Latest version	Latest release date	Device end-of-life		
Version	Initial release date	Latest version	Latest release date	iPad	iPhone	iPod Touch
iPhone OS 1	June 29, 2007	1.1.5	July 15, 2008	—N/a	—N/a	
iPhone OS 2	July 11, 2008	2.2.1	January 27, 2009	—N/a	—N/a	
iPhone OS 3	June 17, 2009	3.2.2	August 11, 2010	—N/a	1st (Note: For the first generation iPhone and iPod Touch, the latest supported version is iOS 3.1.3, released February 2, 2010.)	1st
iOS 4	June 21, 2010	4.3.5 (Note: Released as iOS 4.2.10 for the CDMA variant of the iPhone 4.)	July 25, 2011	—N/a	3G (Note: For the iPhone 3G and iPod Touch (2nd gen), the latest supported version is iOS 4.2.1, released November 22, 2010.)	2nd
iOS 5	October 12, 2011	5.1.1	May 25, 2012	1st	—N/a	3rd
iOS 6	September 19, 2012	6.1.6	February 21, 2014	—N/a	3GS	4th
iOS 7	September 18, 2013	7.1.2	June 30, 2014	—N/a	4	—N/a
iOS 8	September 17, 2014	8.4.1	August 13, 2015	—N/a	—N/a	
iOS 9	September 16, 2015	9.3.6	July 22, 2019	2, 3rd, Mini (Note: For the Wi-Fi-only iPad 2, iPad (4th gen), and iPad Mini (1st gen), and for the iPod Touch (5th gen), the latest supported version is iOS 9.3.5, released August 25, 2016.)	4s	5th
iOS 10	September 13, 2016	10.3.4	July 22, 2019	4th (Note: For the iPhone 5c and Wi-Fi-only iPad (4th gen), the latest supported version is 10.3.3, released July 19, 2017.)	5, 5c	—N/a
iOS 11	September 19, 2017	11.4.1	July 9, 2018	—N/a		
iOS 12	September 17, 2018	12.5.8	January 26, 2026	Air (1st), Mini 2, Mini 3	5s, 6	6th
iOS 13	September 19, 2019	13.7	September 1, 2020	See iPadOS version history	—N/a	
iOS 14	September 16, 2020	14.8.1	October 26, 2021	See iPadOS version history	—N/a	
iOS 15	September 20, 2021	15.8.8	May 11, 2026	See iPadOS version history	6s, SE (1st), 7	7th
iOS 16	September 12, 2022	16.7.16	May 11, 2026	See iPadOS version history	8, X	Discontinued
iOS 17	September 18, 2023	17.7.2	November 19, 2024	See iPadOS version history	—N/a	Discontinued
iOS 18	September 16, 2024	18.7.12	November 9, 2026	See iPadOS version history	XS, XR	Discontinued
iOS 26	September 15, 2025	26.7.3	November 9, 2026	See iPadOS version history	—N/a	Discontinued
iOS 27	September 14, 2026	27.2.1	November 9, 2026	See iPadOS version history	TBA	Discontinued
Legend: Unsupported Supported Latest version Preview version

== Releases ==
=== iPhone OS 1 ===
iPhone OS 1 was announced on January 9, 2007, alongside the first-generation iPhone, with both releasing on June 29. The operating system lacked an official name upon release, with Steve Jobs being quoted as saying "iPhone runs OS X"; however it was later referred to as iPhone Software. During the development phase of iPhone OS 1, there were around 16 or 17 concepts that were developed. Many on the team were skeptical of the feasibility of a touchscreen keyboard, and believed that users would prefer hardware keyboards. A number of different user interfaces were prototyped, including one that involved a multi-touch click-wheel.

iPhone OS 1 laid the groundwork of the iPhone's operating system, including a grid-based Home Screen called SpringBoard, and a set of 16 built-in apps, including Text, for sending Short Message Service (SMS) messages; a YouTube app for watching videos hosted on the platform; and Maps, an app built around Google Maps with support for route directions, traffic conditions in supported regions, and support for finding and contacting businesses. It also featured a version of Safari, the web browser from Mac OS X, built around the iPhone's touchscreen interface. Other apps included iPod, for playback of music synced from a Mac or PC; Mail, for composing, viewing, and receiving emails; Phone, for taking or making calls, viewing or adding contacts, and listening to voicemails; and Settings, for customizing the behavior of iPhone OS and its built-in apps, among others. Support for multi-touch gestures, such as pinch-to-zoom, double tap, and scrolling via flicking and dragging was also included. However, the operating system was criticized for not supporting content made with Adobe Flash, lacking support for cut, copy and paste features, as well as its lack of support for Bluetooth stereo headphones. It also lacked support for third-party native apps, having support only for web apps, which was criticized by reviewers and developers, including John Carmack.

iPhone OS 1.1 was released alongside the first-generation iPod Touch on September 5 as an update exclusive to the device, and added the iTunes Music Store which allowed users to purchase and download music directly onto their iPod Touch. iPhone OS 1.1.1, released on September 27, brought the iTunes Music Store to the iPhone alongside other changes, including louder audio receiver and loudspeaker volume, support for viewing Mail attachments in both portrait and landscape orientations, the ability to adjust the volume of alerts, additional intervals for passcode locking, and an option in Settings that allows turning on or off double tapping the space bar on the built-in software keyboard to automatically insert a period and space. Less significant changes included support for changing the order of stocks and cities in Stocks and Weather, and the ability to disable EDGE and GPRS while roaming. iPhone OS 1.1.2 was released on November 9, adding additional language support and fixing a TIFF security vulnerability.

iPhone OS 1.1.3 was released on January 15, 2008 and added several new features, particularly in Maps, such as a hybrid map view combining the satellite view and street and place labels, the ability to triangulate the user's current location via the use of Wi-Fi and cellular towers as well as the ability to drop pins to specific locations. The Home Screen additionally received several enhancements, including support for rearranging icons, adding shortcuts to websites from Safari, and up to eight individual Home Screen pages. Other changes include increasing the amount of SMS messages that can be stored to 75,000 messages from 1,000 messages, and adding support in Text for sending a message to multiple recipients. Apps were also changed to run from the user mobile instead of the root superuser. iPhone OS 1.1.4 was released on February 26 as the last iPhone OS 1 update for the original iPhone, while iPhone OS 1.1.5 was released on July 15 as the last iPhone OS 1 update for the first-generation iPod Touch.

=== iPhone OS 2 ===
iPhone OS 2 was announced on March 6, 2008 and was released alongside the iPhone 3G on July 11 as a paid update on iPod Touch and a free update on prior iPhone models. It introduced the App Store, a digital storefront allowing users to purchase or download apps directly onto an iPhone or iPod Touch. A software development kit, the iPhone SDK, was released alongside the update and included a set of tools and application programming interfaces (APIs) allowing third-party developers to create native applications. A number of features for enterprise environments were also introduced, including support for Microsoft Exchange through ActiveSync for push emails, contacts and calendars; support for the IPsec VPN protocol; and the ability to remotely wipe a device if marked as lost or stolen. Several new features were added to Mail, including support for viewing Microsoft Office and iWork attachments; the ability to delete or move multiple emails at once; support for blind carbon copy; and the ability to select an outgoing email when composing messages. Other new features included a scientific mode in Calculator while in landscape, a search function for Contacts, and Restrictions, a parental controls system that allows users to, via a 4-digit passcode, lock down certain functionality of the operating system, i.e. disabling access to Safari or disabling playback of explicit music. Several technical and security features were also added, including Wi-Fi Protected Access 2 and IEEE 802.1X support; and the ability to re-enable Wi-Fi while in Airplane Mode.

iPhone OS 2.1 was released on September 12 and added the ability to create Genius playlists, the ability to turn on the forced deletion of all data stored on an iPhone or iPod Touch after ten incorrect passcode attempts, and the ability to disable access to the Camera app from within Restrictions. The update also included numerous bug fixes and technical improvements, including fixes for issues that could cause calls to drop or fail to initialize, improved speed when installing third-party apps from the App Store, improved battery life, reliability improvements when fetching email from IMAP or POP accounts, and hang and crash fixes for when users have a large number of installed third-party apps. iPhone OS 2.1.1 was released alongside the second-generation iPod Touch as an exclusive update unavailable to other iPhone OS 2 devices.

iPhone OS 2.2 was released on November 20 and added new features to Maps, including integration with Google Street View, support for directions when taking public transit or walking, and the ability to share a location by email. Dropped pins were also changed to display the dropped pin's address when tapped. Several changes were also made to Mail, including fixes for isolated issues with regard to scheduled fetching of emails, and improvements to wide HTML email format handling. Other changes made in the update include improved performance and stability within Safari, the ability to download podcasts from the iTunes Store over either Wi-Fi or cellular data, improved sound quality of visual voicemail messages, and the ability to go back to the first Home Screen from any other Home Screen by pressing the Home button. An option in Settings was also added that allows users to turn off the software keyboard's autocorrection feature. iPhone OS 2.2.1 was released on January 27, 2009, as the final version of iPhone OS 2 and contained several fixes, including a fix for SMS messages failing to send.

=== iPhone OS 3 ===
iPhone OS 3 was announced on March 17, 2009 and was released on June 17 alongside the iPhone 3GS. No devices were dropped with this release, but not all features were supported on the original iPhone. It added support for cut, copy and paste, a feature that was previously only available through jailbreaking. Spotlight, the search feature from Mac OS X, was added, allowing users to search for items on their device such as applications, notes, emails, calendar events and music stored on-device; as was Voice Memos, an app that allows users to capture and record audio. The update also included expanded support for landscape orientation including for the software keyboard, adding it to apps like Notes, Mail, and Messages after it was previously only available in apps like Safari and Calculator, with Calculator having previously received support for landscape in iPhone OS 2.0. The Stocks app also received support for landscape when viewing stock history charts. Other major features added with the update included the ability to record video from within the Camera app on the iPhone 3GS; support for sending and receiving Multimedia Messaging Service (MMS) messages on the iPhone 3G and later in the renamed Messages app; expanded support for Bluetooth including stereo headsets; the ability to purchase movies, TV shows, music videos and audiobooks from the iTunes Store app; and the ability for users to shake their device to shuffle the songs in their music library. iPhone OS 3.0.1 was released on July 31 and brought with it a fix for an issue where a maliciously crafted SMS message could lead to arbitrary code execution.

iPhone OS 3.1 was released on September 9 and added support for purchasing ringtones via the iTunes Store, further expanding on the functionality added to the app in iPhone OS 3.0. It also updated the Genius feature to support recommending apps based on the apps currently installed on a user's device. Other features added include support for using Voice Control with a Bluetooth headsets on the iPhone 3GS; the ability for the ability to redeem iTunes gift cards through the App Store; the ability to save videos received from Mail or MMS to the device's camera roll; the option to save a trimmed video as a separate video rather than overwriting the original video; and support for remotely locking an iPhone with a passcode through MobileMe. The update also included various improvements such as better Wi-Fi performance on the iPhone 3G when Bluetooth is enabled; the ability to paste phone numbers directly into the dialpad in the Phone app; improved support for calendar and invitation syncing over Microsoft Exchange; support in Safari for warning when a fraudulent website is visited; and an option to use the Home Button on the iPhone 3GS to toggle on accessibility features. It also fixed an issue where certain app icons were unable to be displayed correctly.

iPhone OS 3.2 was released on April 3, 2010 alongside the first-generation iPad as an exclusive version of iPhone OS 3.x and was not made available to iPhone or iPod touch users. It mainly included optimizations and interface changes to support the larger 9.7 inch display of the iPad, but additionally featured a redesigned Dock to resemble the one included in Mac OS X Snow Leopard, and updated the Home Screen to support Landscape orientation. It additionally removed some apps that are available on iPhone or iPod Touch, mainly the SMS/Messages, Phone, Calculator, Clock, Weather, and Stocks apps. iPhone OS (iOS) 3.2.1 was released on July 15, adding support for Microsoft Bing as a supported search engine and bringing the iOS rename to the iPad. It additionally fixed reliability issues with the iPad's Wi-Fi connectivity, improved video-out reliability when using a VGA adapter, and fixed an issue where video playback could freeze, and fixed an issue with copy and paste related to PDF documents. iOS 3.2.2 was released on August 11, and fixed a security issue where viewing a maliciously crafted PDF document could lead to arbitrary code execution and another where code running as a user could gain system privileges. It was the final version of iPhone OS (iOS) 3.x.

=== iOS 4 ===
iOS 4 was announced on April 8, 2010, as iPhone OS 4 prior to being renamed iOS 4 when the iPhone 4 was revealed on June 7, and was the first version of the operating system to carry the name after the release of the iPad. It was released on June 21 alongside the iPhone 4 as a free upgrade for existing iPod Touch and iPhone users, marking the first time a major release of iOS was made available for free to both iPhone and iPod Touch users; as a result, the practice of charging users for major software upgrades was discontinued, and future releases of the operating system would be made available for all iPhone, iPad, and iPod Touch users at no charge. iOS 4 dropped support for the first-generation iPhone and first-generation iPod Touch and was the first release to drop support for devices supported by prior versions, while support was limited on the iPhone 3G and second-generation iPod touch due to hardware limitations.

iOS 4 introduced multitasking, allowing users to switch between, or close, recently used apps by using a dock that appears after double-clicking the Home Button and allowing for features like background audio playback and VoIP calls, and the ability for apps to retrieve a user's location in the background instead of the app needing to remain open in the foreground, alongside other capabilities like sending local notifications. However, this feature was not supported on the iPhone 3G and second-generation iPod Touch due to hardware limitations. It also introduced the ability to create folders on the Home Screen, allowing users to organize their apps and increasing the maximum number of Home Screen apps from the previous limit of 180 apps to a total of 2,160 apps.

iOS 4.2.1 added support for the original iPad, while iOS 4.3 added support for the iPad 2.

=== iOS 5 ===
iOS 5 was announced on June 6, 2011 and was released on October 12 alongside the iPhone 4S. With this release, Apple did not drop support for these devices, though support for the iPhone 3G and the iPod Touch (2nd generation) had already been dropped with iOS 4.3 seven months earlier due to hardware limitations and performance issues. The release of iOS 5.1 brought support for the iPad (3rd generation). iOS 5.1.1 was the final release supported for the iPad (1st generation) and iPod Touch (3rd generation). iOS 5 was the last major version of iOS to be announced prior to the death of Steve Jobs on October 5, 2011.

=== iOS 6 ===
iOS 6 was announced on June 11, 2012, and was released on September 19 alongside the iPhone 5, iPod Touch (5th generation), and iPad (4th generation). With this release, Apple dropped support for the iPod Touch (3rd generation) and the iPad (1st generation) due to performance issues, and offered only limited support on the iPhone 3GS and iPod Touch (4th generation). The iPhone 4 onwards, the iPod Touch (5th generation), the iPad 2 onwards, and the iPad Mini (1st generation) were fully supported. iOS 6.1.6 was the final release supported for the iPhone 3GS and iPod Touch (4th generation).

=== iOS 7 ===
iOS 7 was announced on June 10, 2013, and was released on September 18 alongside the iPhone 5c and iPhone 5s. Due to hardware and performance limitations, support was dropped for the iPhone 3GS and fourth-generation iPod Touch, while the iPad 2 and iPhone 4 had limited support including not having support for Siri or various other features. It was the first major release of iOS to support 64-bit processors, beginning with the Apple A7 system-on-a-chip (SoC) found in the iPhone 5s. As part of the migration to 64-bit based SoCs, support for apps that target the 64-bit ARM architecture was also added, while support was retained for 32-bit apps until the release of iOS 11 in 2017, which removed the libraries necessary for supporting 32-bit apps.

iOS 7 introduced a significant visual overhaul and redesign of the iOS user interface and its built-in apps, replacing the skeuomorph-inspired design used in earlier iOS versions with flatter design elements, including redesigned icons, a new animation for Slide to Unlock, and a switch from the bold variant of Helvetica Neue to its normal variant. It also introduced the Control Center, a flyout accessible by swiping up from the bottom of the screen that provided access to various controls such as toggling on or off Airplane Mode, Wi-Fi, Bluetooth, Do Not Disturb Mode, and Rotation Lock. It also included controls for screen brightness, volume, and media playback. The Notification Center additionally received a redesign, categorizing it into three tabs: All, Today, and Missed. Other major features included FaceTime Audio for placing audio-only calls over Wi-Fi; AirDrop for wirelessly transferring files and other types of content to and from nearby iOS devices; iTunes Radio, an internet radio service based around automatically generated stations; and enhancements to Siri which allow it to retrieve information from sources such as Wikipedia and Twitter and control a number of device settings, such as Bluetooth. iOS 7.0.3, released on October 22, added support for iCloud Keychain and password generation within Safari, as well as added back to Spotlight the ability to search the web or Wikipedia. After reports started surfacing that the animations used in iOS 7 were causing motion sickness for some users, a setting called Reduce Motion was added as part of the update, which changes various animations across the operating system to be more static.

iOS 7.1 was released on March 10, 2014 and added CarPlay for integrating iOS with a vehicle's automotive head unit or infotainment system, allowing users to control certain aspects of their iPhone while driving such as music playback; answering phone calls or listening to voicemails; displaying turn-by-turn directions and traffic conditions from Apple Maps; and responding to or sending messages. Several features related to accessibility were added, including an option for adding shapes to buttons; and Reduce Motion was brought to more areas of iOS, including the Weather app and the app switcher. Other features added include a month view in Calendar, new male and female voices for Siri in various languages as well as the ability to manually control when it starts or stops listening, and a setting on the iPhone 5s to automatically enable high dynamic range (HDR) when taking photos. The update also improves performance on the iPhone 4, improves reliability when using Touch ID, and fixes a SpringBoard crash. iOS 7.1.1, released on April 22, further improved Touch ID reliability; improved keyboard responsiveness; and fixed issues surrounding the use of Bluetooth keyboards when VoiceOver was active. iOS 7.1.2 was released on June 30 as the final iOS 7 update which improved the stability and connectivity of iBeacons, fixed data transfer issues with certain accessories, and fixed a security issue involving attachments received in Mail.

=== iOS 8 ===
iOS 8 was announced on June 2, 2014, and was released on September 17 alongside the iPhone 6 and iPhone 6 Plus. With this release, Apple dropped support for the iPhone 4 due to performance issues. Apple received widespread complaints of extremely poor performance from owners of the iPad 2, iPhone 4S, iPad (3rd generation), iPad Mini (1st generation), and the iPod Touch (5th generation). All other devices from the iPhone 5 onwards, iPod Touch (6th generation) onwards, the iPad (4th generation) onwards, and the iPad Mini 2 onwards were fully supported. The release of iOS 8.1 brought support for the iPad Air 2 and iPad Mini 3, and the release of iOS 8.4 brought support for the iPod Touch (6th generation). iOS 8.3 was the first version of iOS to have public beta testing available, where users could test the beta for upcoming releases of iOS and send feedback to Apple about bugs and issues. The final version of iOS 8 was iOS 8.4.1.

=== iOS 9 ===
iOS 9 was announced on June 8, 2015, and was released on September 16 alongside the iPhone 6S and 6S Plus and iPad Mini 4. With this release, Apple did not drop support for any iOS devices, but support for Apple TV (3rd generation) has been dropped following the release due to 32-bit deprecations. Therefore, iOS 9 was supported on the iPhone 4S onwards, iPod Touch (5th generation) onwards, the iPad 2 onwards, and the iPad Mini (1st generation) onwards. This release made the iPad 2 the first device to support six major releases of iOS, supporting iOS 4 through iOS 9. Despite Apple's promise of better performance on these devices, there were still widespread complaints that the issue had not been fixed. iOS 9.3.5 is the final release on the iPod Touch (5th generation), the Wi-Fi-only iPad 2, the Wi-Fi-only iPad (3rd generation), and the Wi-Fi-only iPad Mini (1st generation). iOS 9.3.6 is the final release on the iPhone 4S, the Wi-Fi + cellular iPad 2, the Wi-Fi + cellular iPad (3rd generation), and the Wi-Fi + cellular iPad Mini (1st generation). iOS 9 is the last version to run on iPhones and iPads with 30-pin connector.

=== iOS 10 ===
iOS 10 was announced on June 13, 2016, and was released on September 13 alongside the iPhone 7 and iPhone 7 Plus. With this release, Apple dropped support for devices using an A5 or A5X processor: the iPhone 4S, the iPad 2, iPad (3rd generation), iPad Mini (1st generation), and iPod Touch (5th generation) due to hardware limitations and performance issues, ending software support for iPhones and iPads with 30-pin connector and 3.5-inch display. However, the iPhone 5S onwards, iPod Touch (6th generation), iPad Air onwards, and the iPad Mini 2 onwards are fully supported. The release of iOS 10.2.1 brought support for the iPad (5th generation), and iOS 10.3.2 brought support for the iPad Pro (10.5-inch) and the iPad Pro (12.9-inch, 2nd generation). iOS 10.3.3 is the final supported release for the iPhone 5C and the Wi-Fi—only iPad (4th generation), while iOS 10.3.4 is the final supported release for the iPhone 5 and the iPad (4th generation) with cellular modem. iOS 10 is the final iOS version to run on 32-bit processors, including non–Touch ID iPhones. It is also the final version of iOS to run 32-bit apps.

=== iOS 11 ===
iOS 11 was announced on June 5, 2017, and was released on September 19 alongside the iPhone 8 and iPhone 8 Plus. With this release, Apple dropped support for the 32-bit iPhone 5, iPhone 5C, and iPad (4th generation) and also for 32-bit apps. However, all other devices from the iPhone 5S onwards, iPhone SE (1st generation), iPad Pro, and iPad (5th generation) onwards are fully supported. iOS 11.0.1 brought support for the iPhone X and iOS 11.3 brought support for the iPad (6th generation). The final version of iOS 11 to be released was iOS 11.4.1. iOS 11 is the first version of iOS to only run on 64-bit processors. It is also the first iOS version to run only 64-bit apps; 32-bit apps are not supported on iOS 11 or later.

=== iOS 12 ===
iOS 12 was announced on June 4, 2018, and was released on September 17 alongside the iPhone XS and XS Max and iPhone XR. iOS 12 retained support with all devices that ran iOS 11, however the iPhone 5S, iPhone 6 and 6 Plus, sixth-generation iPod Touch, iPad Air and iPad Mini 2 had limited support.

iOS 12 was focused on improving performance, particularly on older devices such as the iPhone 6. Several focus areas included the keyboard, re-engineered to appear up to 50% faster; app launch times, improved to be up to 40% faster; and the action to slide up to take a photo, made up to 70% faster. However, several new features were also introduced, such as Memoji, a feature that allows users to create "personalized emojis", a new Screen Time feature to track and limit device usage, improvements to the Siri virtual assistant, and iBooks received a redesign and a name change to Apple Books.

iOS 12 was the last major release of iOS to support the iPad prior to the launch of iPadOS in 2019 with iPadOS 13.

=== iOS 13 ===
iOS 13 was announced on June 3, 2019, and was released on September 19 alongside the IPhone 11 and iPhone 11 Pro and Pro Max. The principal features include an option for dark mode and Memoji support. The NFC framework now supports reading several types of contactless smartcards and tags. With iOS 13, Apple branched off the iPad version of iOS into its own entity named iPadOS. All iPhone and iPod touch models from the iPhone 6S and later and the iPod Touch (7th generation) are fully supported (A9 and A10 Fusion devices have almost full support, while those with A11 Bionic and later chips have full support). iOS 13 brought support for the iPhone 11 series and the second-generation iPhone SE.

=== iOS 14 ===
iOS 14 was announced on June 22, 2020 and was released on September 16. All devices that supported iOS 13 also support iOS 14. Some new features introduced in iOS 14 include redesigned widgets that can now be placed directly on the home screen; the App Library, which automatically categorizes apps into one page; Picture-in-Picture on iPhone and iPod Touch; and the CarKey technology to unlock and start a car with NFC. iOS 14 also allows users to have incoming calls shown in banners rather than taking up the whole screen (the latter view is still available as an optional function).

The release of iOS 14.1 brought support for the iPhone 12 series.

=== iOS 15 ===
iOS 15 was announced on June 7, 2021, and was released on September 20. All devices that ran iOS 14 are compatible with iOS 15. iOS 15 has limited support on the iPhone 6S, iPhone 7, iPhone 8, iPhone X, iPhone SE (1st generation), and iPod Touch (7th generation). iOS 15.4 added support for the iPhone SE 3rd generation. iOS 15 is the final version of iOS to work on the iPod Touch line, as the final model, the 7th generation, was discontinued without a successor.

=== iOS 16 ===
iOS 16 was announced on June 6, 2022, and was released on September 12. iPhone 6S, IPhone SE (1st generation), iPhone 7 and iPod touch (7th generation) were dropped. iOS 16 is the first release to not support any iPod Touch models, as the line was discontinued by Apple in May 2022, leaving the iPhone as the only supported product line to run iOS. iOS 16 served as the version that shipped on the iPhone 14 and iPhone 14 Pro.

iOS 16 introduced an overhaul of the lock screen which added support for widgets and additional customization options, including customizing how the date and time appears through new font and color options, additional wallpaper customization options, and support for multiple lock screens. Other features included editing and deleting messages sent via iMessage, support for Live Activities via a new API called ActivityKit (added in iOS 16.1), among other features. iOS 16 also added support for Rapid Security Response updates which focus on fixes for critical security vulnerabilities; it was first used with the release of iOS 16.4.1.

=== iOS 17 ===
iOS 17 was announced on June 5, 2023, and was released on September 18. With this release, Apple dropped support for the iPhone 8 and iPhone X. iOS 17 added support for iPhone 15 and iPhone 15 Pro.

=== iOS 18 ===
iOS 18 was announced on June 10, 2024 and released on September 16, retaining compatibility with all iPhones compatible with iOS 17 and adding support for the iPhone 16 and iPhone 16 Pro and Pro Max. It introduced a more customizable Home Screen, adding support for placing icons anywhere and support for dark mode-compatible icons, and the ability to set a custom "tinted" color for all icons. App icons can also be made larger for easier visibility, while hiding the app labels. A redesigned and more customizable Control Center was also introduced, adding support for sorting and organizing controls into Pages, the ability to resize and place controls anywhere on a Page, and support for adding third-party controls. Several enhancements to iMessage were also added, including bold, italics, underline and strikethrough text formatting options; message scheduling; Rich Communication Services (RCS) support for improved compatibility with Android devices; and additional text effects along with the ability to use any emoji or sticker as a Tapback reaction. Other features included a more customizable redesign of Photos; the ability to hide apps or lock them behind Face ID, Touch ID, or a passcode; and a dedicated Passwords app that replaces the prior iCloud Keychain section in Settings.

iOS 18.1, released on October 28, introduced the initial suite of Apple Intelligence features for supported devices. This included Writing Tools, a set of writing assistance tools; Siri enhancements including a redesign and conversational contextual understanding among other enhancements; and enhancements to Photos such as more contextual search and a tool for removing objects from pictures called "Clean Up". Other features included notification summaries that generate summaries for groups of notifications and the ability to respond to messages quickly through the use of generated short responses called "Smart Reply", among others. The update also added various other features unrelated to Apple Intelligence, including call recording with support for live transcripts, and various AirPods Pro features, including a Hearing Test feature that tests a wearer's hearing, intended for users aged 18 or older, and the ability for the headphones to serve as a clinical-grade hearing aid.

iOS 18.2, released on December 11, added additional Apple Intelligence features, mainly relating to image generation: Image Playground for generating regular images; Genmoji for generating custom emoji for use in supported apps, such as Messages; and Image Wand, a feature that generates images in Notes from drawn sketches. Siri and Writing Tools received ChatGPT integration, and support was added for Visual Intelligence on supported devices. Other features included import and export tools for Safari; improvements to Mail such as optional automatic mail categorization; and enhancements to Photos including the ability to scrub videos frame-by-frame and turn on or off automatic looping of videos, and the ability to clear the Recently Viewed and Recently Shared sections.

iOS 18.3, released on January 27, 2025, added the capability for Visual Intelligence to recognize dates in flyers or posters and prompt to add them to Calendar, more clearly indicated that notification summaries are generated by Apple Intelligence, and added support for the iPhone 16e. iOS 18.4, released on March 31, added additional Apple Intelligence features, including support for "priority notifications"; a new "Sketch" option in Image Playground; and support for 8 additional languages. Features added unrelated to Apple Intelligence mainly included support for 8 additional emoji as part of Unicode version 16.0 and enhancements to the Photos app, including new filters to include or exclude photos from albums or that have been synced from a Mac or PC; the ability to reorder items inside of the "Media Types" and "Utilities" collections; a "Date Modified" sort option for album; and other enhancements. Other minor features included a new Apple Vision Pro app; recipes support in the Apple News+ subscription service; support for ten additional system languages; support in Safari for viewing recent search suggestions and other enhancements. iOS 18.5, released on May 12, added a new Pride Harmony wallpaper in support of Pride Month and added support for "carrier-provided" satellite features on all iPhone 13 and iPhone 13 Pro models. iOS 18.6, released on July 29, fixed an issue in the Photos app where "Memory Movies" were unable to be created, and iOS 18.7, released on September 15 and coinciding with the release of iOS 26 as the final major point update to iOS 18, included unspecified bug fixes. iOS 18.7.12 is the current version of iOS 18, released on November 9, 2026.

=== iOS 26 ===
iOS 26 was announced on June 9, 2025, and released on September 15, as the first version of iOS to use Apple's new year-based versioning scheme. It introduced Liquid Glass, the first major redesign of the operating system since iOS 7, based around the element of glass. The design language extends to all of Apple's other platforms, including iPadOS, macOS, watchOS, tvOS and visionOS, marking the first time Apple has used a unified design language across all of their operating systems. iOS 26 drops support for the iPhone XS and XS Max and iPhone XR, resulting in the end of support for devices that include the A12 Bionic, while adding support for the iPhone 17, iPhone 17 Pro and Pro Max and the iPhone Air that were released on September 19.

=== iOS 27 ===
iOS 27 was announced on June 8, 2026. iOS 27 introduces Siri AI, a new model designed by Apple in collaboration with Google. Apple retained compatibility with all iPhone models that support iOS 26, including the iPhone 11, iPhone 11 Pro, iPhone 11 Pro Max, and iPhone SE (2nd generation). Apple Intelligence features require an Apple A17 Pro chip or newer, as found on the iPhone 15 Pro or newer. Even though devices may be Apple Intelligence-ready, some features such as improved Siri voices and improved on-device dictation require an Apple A19 Pro chip or newer, found on devices including iPhone Air, iPhone 17 Pro, and iPhone 17 Pro Max.

== Hardware support ==
=== iPhone ===
Supported iOS versions on the iPhone
Model	iPhone OS			iOS																
Model	1	2	3	4	5	6	7	8	9	10	11	12	13	14	15	16	17	18	26	27
iPhone (1st)	Supported	Supported	3.1.3	Unsupported	Unsupported	Unsupported	Unsupported	Unsupported	Unsupported	Unsupported	Unsupported	Unsupported	Unsupported	Unsupported	Unsupported	Unsupported	Unsupported	Unsupported	Unsupported	Unsupported
iPhone 3G	—N/a	Supported	Supported	4.2.1	Unsupported	Unsupported	Unsupported	Unsupported	Unsupported	Unsupported	Unsupported	Unsupported	Unsupported	Unsupported	Unsupported	Unsupported	Unsupported	Unsupported	Unsupported	Unsupported
iPhone 3GS	—N/a		Supported	Supported	Supported	Supported	Unsupported	Unsupported	Unsupported	Unsupported	Unsupported	Unsupported	Unsupported	Unsupported	Unsupported	Unsupported	Unsupported	Unsupported	Unsupported	Unsupported
iPhone 4	—N/a			Supported	Supported	Supported	Supported	Unsupported	Unsupported	Unsupported	Unsupported	Unsupported	Unsupported	Unsupported	Unsupported	Unsupported	Unsupported	Unsupported	Unsupported	Unsupported
iPhone 4s	—N/a				Supported	Supported	Supported	Supported	Supported	Unsupported	Unsupported	Unsupported	Unsupported	Unsupported	Unsupported	Unsupported	Unsupported	Unsupported	Unsupported	Unsupported
iPhone 5	—N/a					Supported	Supported	Supported	Supported	Supported	Unsupported	Unsupported	Unsupported	Unsupported	Unsupported	Unsupported	Unsupported	Unsupported	Unsupported	Unsupported
iPhone 5c	—N/a						Supported	Supported	Supported	Supported	Unsupported	Unsupported	Unsupported	Unsupported	Unsupported	Unsupported	Unsupported	Unsupported	Unsupported	Unsupported
iPhone 5s	—N/a						Supported	Supported	Supported	Supported	Supported	Supported	Unsupported	Unsupported	Unsupported	Unsupported	Unsupported	Unsupported	Unsupported	Unsupported
iPhone 6	—N/a							Supported	Supported	Supported	Supported	Supported	Unsupported	Unsupported	Unsupported	Unsupported	Unsupported	Unsupported	Unsupported	Unsupported
iPhone 6s	—N/a								Supported	Supported	Supported	Supported	Supported	Supported	Supported	Unsupported	Unsupported	Unsupported	Unsupported	Unsupported
iPhone SE (1st)	—N/a								9.3.1	Supported	Supported	Supported	Supported	Supported	Supported	Unsupported	Unsupported	Unsupported	Unsupported	Unsupported
iPhone 7	—N/a									Supported	Supported	Supported	Supported	Supported	Supported	Unsupported	Unsupported	Unsupported	Unsupported	Unsupported
iPhone 8	—N/a										Supported	Supported	Supported	Supported	Supported	Supported	Unsupported	Unsupported	Unsupported	Unsupported
iPhone X	—N/a										11.0.1	Supported	Supported	Supported	Supported	Supported	Unsupported	Unsupported	Unsupported	Unsupported
iPhone XR / XS	—N/a											Supported	Supported	Supported	Supported	Supported	Supported	Supported	Unsupported	Unsupported
iPhone 11 / 11 Pro	—N/a												Supported	Supported	Supported	Supported	Supported	Supported	Supported	Supported
iPhone SE (2nd)	—N/a												13.4	Supported	Supported	Supported	Supported	Supported	Supported	Supported
iPhone 12 / 12 Pro	—N/a													14.1 / 14.2 (Note: 14.1 on iPhone 12 and iPhone 12 Pro. 14.2 on iPhone 12 Mini and iPhone 12 Pro Max.)	Supported	Supported	Supported	Supported	Supported	Supported
iPhone 13 / 13 Pro	—N/a														Supported	Supported	Supported	Supported	Supported	Supported
iPhone SE (3rd)	—N/a														15.4	Supported	Supported	Supported	Supported	Supported
iPhone 14 / 14 Pro	—N/a															Supported	Supported	Supported	Supported	Supported
iPhone 15 / 15 Pro	—N/a																Supported	Supported	Supported	Supported
iPhone 16 / 16 Pro	—N/a																	Supported	Supported	Supported
iPhone 16e	—N/a																	18.3	Supported	Supported
iPhone 17 / 17 Pro	—N/a																		Supported	Supported
iPhone Air	—N/a																		Supported	Supported
iPhone 17e	—N/a																		26.3	Supported
iPhone 18 Pro	—N/a																			Yes
iPhone Duo	—N/a																			27.1
Note: Model variants (Mini, Plus, Pro, Pro Max) have the same support as the base model unless specified.

=== iPad ===
Supported iOS and iPadOS versions on the iPad
Model	iOS (Note: The OS was called "iPhone OS" for version 3.2.x only.)										iPadOS							
Model	3	4	5	6	7	8	9	10	11	12	13	14	15	16 (Note: iPadOS 16.0 was only available as a Beta, with version 16.1 being the first stable version.)	17	18	26	27
iPad (1st)	3.2	Supported	Supported	Unsupported	Unsupported	Unsupported	Unsupported	Unsupported	Unsupported	Unsupported	Unsupported	Unsupported	Unsupported	Unsupported	Unsupported	Unsupported	Unsupported	Unsupported
iPad 2	—N/a	4.3	Supported	Supported	Supported	Supported	Supported	Unsupported	Unsupported	Unsupported	Unsupported	Unsupported	Unsupported	Unsupported	Unsupported	Unsupported	Unsupported	Unsupported
iPad (3rd)	—N/a		5.1	Supported	Supported	Supported	Supported	Unsupported	Unsupported	Unsupported	Unsupported	Unsupported	Unsupported	Unsupported	Unsupported	Unsupported	Unsupported	Unsupported
iPad (4th)	—N/a			Supported	Supported	Supported	Supported	Supported	Unsupported	Unsupported	Unsupported	Unsupported	Unsupported	Unsupported	Unsupported	Unsupported	Unsupported	Unsupported
iPad (5th)	—N/a							10.2.1	Supported	Supported	Supported	Supported	Supported	Supported	Unsupported	Unsupported	Unsupported	Unsupported
iPad (6th)	—N/a								11.3	Supported	Supported	Supported	Supported	Supported	Supported	Unsupported	Unsupported	Unsupported
iPad (7th)	—N/a										13.1	Supported	Supported	Supported	Supported	Supported	Unsupported	Unsupported
iPad (8th)	—N/a											Supported	Supported	Supported	Supported	Supported	Supported	Unsupported
iPad (9th)	—N/a												Supported	Supported	Supported	Supported	Supported	Supported
iPad (10th)	—N/a													16.1	Supported	Supported	Supported	Supported
iPad (11th)	—N/a															18.3.1	Supported	Supported

==== iPad Mini ====
Supported iOS and iPadOS versions on the iPad Mini
Model	iOS							iPadOS							
Model	6	7	8	9	10	11	12	13	14	15	16	17	18	26	27
Mini (1st)	6.0.1	Supported	Supported	Supported	Unsupported	Unsupported	Unsupported	Unsupported	Unsupported	Unsupported	Unsupported	Unsupported	Unsupported	Unsupported	Unsupported
Mini 2	—N/a	7.0.3	Supported	Supported	Supported	Supported	Supported	Unsupported	Unsupported	Unsupported	Unsupported	Unsupported	Unsupported	Unsupported	Unsupported
Mini 3	—N/a		8.1	Supported	Supported	Supported	Supported	Unsupported	Unsupported	Unsupported	Unsupported	Unsupported	Unsupported	Unsupported	Unsupported
Mini 4	—N/a			Supported	Supported	Supported	Supported	Supported	Supported	Supported	Unsupported	Unsupported	Unsupported	Unsupported	Unsupported
Mini (5th)	—N/a						12.2	Supported	Supported	Supported	Supported	Supported	Supported	Supported	Unsupported
Mini (6th)	—N/a									Supported	Supported	Supported	Supported	Supported	Supported
Mini (7th)	—N/a												Supported	Supported	Supported
Mini (8th)	—N/a														27.2

==== iPad Air ====
Supported iOS and iPadOS versions on the iPad Air
Model	iOS						iPadOS							
Model	7	8	9	10	11	12	13	14	15	16	17	18	26	27
Air (1st)	7.0.3	Supported	Supported	Supported	Supported	Supported	Unsupported	Unsupported	Unsupported	Unsupported	Unsupported	Unsupported	Unsupported	Unsupported
Air 2	—N/a	8.1	Supported	Supported	Supported	Supported	Supported	Supported	Supported	Unsupported	Unsupported	Unsupported	Unsupported	Unsupported
Air (3rd)	—N/a					12.2	Supported	Supported	Supported	Supported	Supported	Supported	Supported	Unsupported
Air (4th)	—N/a							14.1	Supported	Supported	Supported	Supported	Supported	Supported
Air (5th)	—N/a								15.4	Supported	Supported	Supported	Supported	Supported
Air (6th)	—N/a										17.4	Supported	Supported	Supported
Air (7th)	—N/a											18.3.1	Supported	Supported
Air (8th)	—N/a												26.3	Supported

==== iPad Pro ====
Supported iOS and iPadOS versions on the iPad Pro
Model	iOS				iPadOS							
Model	9	10	11	12	13	14	15	16	17	18	26	27
Pro (1st)	9.1 / 9.3 (Note: iOS 9.1 on iPad Pro 12.9" (2015). iOS 9.3 on iPad Pro 9.7" (2016).)	Supported	Supported	Supported	Supported	Supported	Supported	Supported	Unsupported	Unsupported	Unsupported	Unsupported
Pro (2nd)	—N/a	10.3.2	Supported	Supported	Supported	Supported	Supported	Supported	Supported	Unsupported	Unsupported	Unsupported
Pro (3rd)	—N/a			12.1	Supported	Supported	Supported	Supported	Supported	Supported	Supported	Unsupported
Pro (4th)	—N/a				13.4	Supported	Supported	Supported	Supported	Supported	Supported	Supported
Pro (5th)	—N/a					14.5	Supported	Supported	Supported	Supported	Supported	Supported
Pro (6th)	—N/a							16.1	Supported	Supported	Supported	Supported
Pro (7th)	—N/a								17.4	Supported	Supported	Supported
Pro (8th)	—N/a										Supported	Supported

=== iPod Touch ===
Supported iOS versions on the iPod Touch
Model	iPhone OS			iOS											
Model	1	2	3	4	5	6	7	8	9	10	11	12	13	14	15 (Note: iOS 15 is the last supported version on any iPod Touch.)
iPod Touch (1st)	1.1	Supported	Supported	Unsupported	Unsupported	Unsupported	Unsupported	Unsupported	Unsupported	Unsupported	Unsupported	Unsupported	Unsupported	Unsupported	Unsupported
iPod Touch (2nd)	—N/a	2.1.1	Supported	Supported	Unsupported	Unsupported	Unsupported	Unsupported	Unsupported	Unsupported	Unsupported	Unsupported	Unsupported	Unsupported	Unsupported
iPod Touch (3rd)	—N/a		3.1.1	Supported	Supported	Unsupported	Unsupported	Unsupported	Unsupported	Unsupported	Unsupported	Unsupported	Unsupported	Unsupported	Unsupported
iPod Touch (4th)	—N/a			4.1	Supported	Supported	Unsupported	Unsupported	Unsupported	Unsupported	Unsupported	Unsupported	Unsupported	Unsupported	Unsupported
iPod Touch (5th)	—N/a					6.0	Supported	Supported	Supported	Unsupported	Unsupported	Unsupported	Unsupported	Unsupported	Unsupported
iPod Touch (6th)	—N/a							8.4	Supported	Supported	Supported	Supported	Unsupported	Unsupported	Unsupported
iPod Touch (7th)	—N/a											12.3.1	Supported	Supported	Supported

== Timeline of iOS and derivative operating systems ==
Timeline of iOS and derivative operating systems

== See also ==
- Android version history
- Calendar versioning
- Issues relating to iOS
- List of iPhone models
