= IPhone 3 =

iPhone 3 may refer to one of two mobile phones made by Apple Inc.:

- The iPhone 3G, a mobile phone released in 2008
- The iPhone 3GS, a mobile phone released in 2009
