= MyDevice =

MyOrigo phone

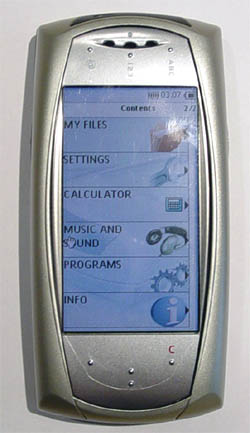
MyOrigo MyDevice (in a portrait mode.)

MyDevice was a smartphone manufactured by the Finnish company MyOrigo. The first prototype was developed and designed in early 2002 by Johannes Väänänen, but the phone was never released to the public markets. MyDevice was remarkable for its time, since it had auto-rotate function, web browser, simplistic "smartphone UI and functions" (like navigating with swipes) and it was more intended to be used without stylus. The device was presented to big manufacturers like Nokia, but the leaders at Nokia didn't see the potential for a touchscreen-phone.

In 2002 MyDevice prototype was presented to Apple's Steve Jobs. It has been suggested that MyDevice was the inspiration for the Apple iPhone, which was released in 2007.
