= IPhone OS 2 =

2008 mobile operating system

iPhone OS 2
- Version of the iOS operating system

- iPhone OS 2 home screen on an iPhone 3G
- Developer: Apple Inc.
- Working state: No longer supported
- Source model: Closed, with open source components
- Initial release: July 11, 2008; 18 years ago
- Latest release: 2.2.1 (5H11 / 5H11a) / January 27, 2009; 17 years ago
- Update method: iTunes through a computer
- Package manager: App Store
- Supported platforms: iPhone and iPod Touch
- Kernel type: Hybrid (XNU)
- License: Proprietary except for open-source components
- Preceded by: iPhone OS 1
- Succeeded by: iPhone OS 3
- Official website: Apple - iPhone - Software Update - 2.0.0 at the Wayback Machine (archived September 12, 2008)

Support status
- Obsolete, unsupported

iPhone OS 2 is the second major release of the iOS mobile operating system developed by Apple Inc., being the successor to iPhone OS 1. It was the first version of iOS to support third-party applications via the App Store. iPhone OS 2.2.1 is the final version of iPhone OS 2. It was succeeded by iPhone OS 3 on June 17, 2009.

iPhone OS 2 was released on July 11, 2008, with the iPhone 3G. First-generation iPhones and iPod Touches running iPhone OS 1 are upgradable to this version, but it costs $9.95 on the iPod Touch. This version of iOS introduces the App Store, making third-party applications officially available to the iPhone and iPod Touch. Before the public release of iPhone OS 2, Apple held a keynote event to announce the iPhone OS Software Development Kit ("SDK") to developers. Originally it was called 1.2.

== Default apps ==
- Text
- YouTube
- Clock
- iTunes
- Calendar
- Stocks
- Calculator
- App Store
- Photos
- Maps
- Notes
- Videos (iPod Touch exclusive)
- Camera
- Weather
- Settings

=== Dock ===
- Phone
- Mail
- Safari
- iPod (Music on the iPod touch)

== History ==
iPhone OS 2 was introduced at the Apple Worldwide Developers Conference keynote address on June 9, 2008.
iPhone OS 2 was released on July 11, 2008. It was released alongside the iPhone 3G and ran on the first-generation iPhone as well.

== Features ==
- A new built in app called the App Store was added. Before the application was introduced, the only way to install custom applications on the device was via jailbreaking, which was unsupported by Apple. 500 applications were available for download at the launch of the App Store.
- The Mail app had a redesign, with push emails that provide an always-on capability. It also supports Microsoft Office and iWork attachments. Other new features include support for true BCC, multiple email delete, and the ability to select an outgoing email.
- The ability to save images has been added.
- On the iPhone, the iPod app gained the ability to create music libraries.
- The ability to set the default language to Norwegian, Swedish, Danish, Finnish, Polish, Dutch, Korean, Brazilian, and Portuguese was added.
- The software now supports WPA2 and 802.1X internet protocols.
- The Contacts app and iTunes Store app both get redesigned home screen icons, though the latter only affects the iPod Touch.
- A search bar was introduced to Contacts alongside the ability to import SIM contacts.
- MobileMe support has been added.
- The calendar app gains the ability to create multiple events at a time, which are color-coded to differentiate each other.
- When the device is in landscape mode, the calculator app displays a scientific calculator. The app icon was also updated.
- Settings now can turn Wi-Fi back on while in Airplane mode, as well as the ability to turn Location Services on or off.

== Reception ==
Rene Ritchie at iMore said, "Overall, iPhone Firmware 2.0 is a stunning achievement that really puts the iPhone on par with the Apple II and Mac as one of the great revolutions in modern technology. It takes it beyond simple Phone + iPod, or even smartphone, and makes it the leading contender for the next great shift in computing." However, they criticized it for having stability issues and overall sluggishness.

Macworld said, "The iPhone 2.0 software is full of the kind of refinements that you'd expect from a second-generation Apple product. The iPhone OS still isn't perfect, and we wish Apple had addressed some lingering shortcomings, but it's a welcome step-up for what was already arguably the best mobile platform on the market."

== Update price for iPod touch ==
The update from iPhone OS 1 to iPhone OS 2 was free for iPhone users; however, it cost $9.95 for iPod touch users, due to accounting rules and the need to comply with the Sarbanes-Oxley Act. These accounting rules were later changed after lobbying from Apple and other software companies. Free copies of the iPod touch update circulated online. Minor updates to iPhone OS 2 were free for iPod touch users.

== Supported devices ==
iPhone

- iPhone (1st generation)
- iPhone 3G

iPod Touch

- iPod Touch (1st generation)
- iPod Touch (2nd generation)

== Version history ==
Version	Release date	Notes
2.0	July 11, 2008	Initial release on iPhone 3G: Adds Norwegian, Swedish, Danish, Finnish, Polish, Dutch, Korean, Brazilian, and Portuguese language support; Allows importing contacts from SIM; Adds BCC support in the Mail app; Multiple calendars can now be used in Calendar and are differentiated via color-coding; Calendar menu is added to Settings; App Store is added, allowing installation of third-party apps; Adds support for WPA2 and 802.1X; Allows enabling only Wi-Fi while in Airplane Mode; Allows taking screen captures; Adds support for SVG images; Allows saving pictures from Mail or Safari to Photos; The Calculator app icon and in app buttons were changed to be more square; Adds Parental Controls; Allows toggling Parental Controls; Photos taken with the Camera app can be geotagged
2.0.1	August 4, 2008	Improves Contacts app stability; Improves Calendar app stability; Improves keyboard responsiveness
2.0.2	August 18, 2008	Improves cellular communication on the iPhone 3G; Removes the "Update All" button in the App Store
2.1; 2.1.1 (Note: iPod touch (2nd generation) only)	September 12, 2008; September 9, 2008	Initial release on iPod Touch (2nd generation), not released on iPhone 3G: Used storage space is now visible on-device; Updates are now faster; Fixes a passcode bypass; Increases speed of third-party app installation; Improves battery life; Improves 3G cellular strength reporting; 24-hour clock is now usable to UK users; Fixes the calculator bug where incorrect answers were reported if a calculation involved pi; Adds the option to erase all data after ten failed passcode attempts. After 5 attempts, the device will disable itself for 1 minute. After the 6th attempt, it will disable itself for 5 minutes. On the 10th attempt, it will wipe all data instead of saying "iPhone/iPod is disabled, connect to iTunes".; Adds creation of Genius playlists
2.2	November 20, 2008	Addition of Google Street View and walking and public transit directions on the iPhone; Podcasts can be downloaded from the device, without needing to sync with iTunes; New option to turn off auto-correct; Support for Emoji, exclusive to Japanese iPhones
2.2.1	January 27, 2009	Updates the baseband to patch a security exploit that allowed unofficial SIM-unlock of the iPhone 3G; Bug fixes

== Notes ==
Preceded by iPhone OS 1	iPhone OS 2; 2008	Succeeded by iPhone OS 3
