= Oke Okaro =

Technology executive

- Education: M.B.A. Wharton School, Bsc. University of Hertfordshire
- Occupations: Chief Product Officer at Reuters, SVP of Business Operations at Disney, VP of Digital Experience at Verizon, SVP of Mobile at Bloomberg L.P., VP & GM of Mobile at ESPN

Oke Okaro is a technology executive and pioneering innovator in the mobile technology industry. He was the Chief Product Officer at Reuters. Before Reuters, he was Senior Vice President (SVP) of Business Operations at Disney, where he worked for the global technology organization behind Disney's Media and Entertainment brands He founded ESPN Mobile in 2004 and ESPN Interactive TV in 2005. In 2010, he started the mobile business at Bloomberg L.P. In 2015, he founded Burner a wellness technology platform. In 2017, Okaro worked as the VP of Digital Experience at Verizon.

Okaro created the first third-party video streaming app for Apple Inc.'s iOS platform with his team at ESPN. He presented the app for ESPN on stage during the IOS 3 release event in 2009. Okaro also created the first iOS app with push notifications which he demonstrated at the iPhone OS 3 release event. Okaro also created the first iOS app to use Apple's subscription service when he launched the Bloomberg Businessweek+ app in April 2011. He was a co-creator of BREW (binary runtime for wireless), the first mobile application development and distribution platform created by Qualcomm. In 2001, Okaro was among the first people in the U.S. to create mobile apps. Okaro has 12 U.S. patents for mobile technology.

== Education ==
Okaro obtained an undergraduate degree in Computer Science from the University of Hertfordshire in 1996, and an MBA from the Wharton School of Business at the University of Pennsylvania in 2002.
