= IPhone OS 3 =

2009 mobile operating system

iPhone OS 3
- Version of the iOS operating system
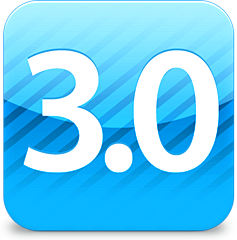

- iPhone OS 3.1 home screen on an iPhone 3GS
- Developer: Apple Inc.
- Working state: No longer supported
- Source model: Closed, with open source components
- Initial release: June 17, 2009; 17 years ago
- Latest release: 3.2.2 (7B500) / August 11, 2010; 16 years ago
- Update method: iTunes through a computer
- Package manager: App Store
- Supported platforms: iPhone, iPod Touch, iPad
- Kernel type: Hybrid (XNU)
- License: Proprietary software except for open-source components
- Preceded by: iPhone OS 2
- Succeeded by: iOS 4
- Official website: Apple - iPhone - New features in the iPhone 3.0 Software Update at the Wayback Machine (archived August 18, 2009)

Support status
- Obsolete, unsupported

iPhone OS 3 (stylized as iPhone OS 3.0) is the third major release of the iOS mobile operating system developed by Apple Inc., succeeding iPhone OS 2. It was announced on March 17, 2009, and was released on June 17, 2009. It was succeeded by iOS 4 on June 21, 2010, dropping the "iPhone OS" naming convention.

iPhone OS 3 added a system-wide "cut, copy, and paste" feature, allowing users to move content more easily. It also introduced Spotlight, a search indexing feature designed to help users locate specific information on their device, such as contacts, email messages, or apps. The home screen was expanded to let users add up to 11 pages, showcasing a total of 180 apps. The Messages app received support for MMS, the Camera app received video recording support on the iPhone 3GS, and a new "Voice Memos" app let users record their voice. In-app purchase capability was added to third-party applications in the App Store as well. Apple also added the accessibility screen reader option VoiceOver to iOS devices with this release.

iPhone OS 3 is the last version of iOS that supports the first-generation iPhone and first-generation iPod Touch as its successor, iOS 4, drops support for both models.

iPhone OS 3.2 is the first iPhone OS version to support the first generation iPad.

== Default apps ==
- iTunes
- App Store
- Text
- Calendar
- Photos
- Camera
- YouTube
- Stocks
- Maps
- Weather
- Clock
- Calculator
- Notes
- Settings

=== Default dock ===
- Phone
- Mail
- Safari
- iPod/Music

== System features ==
iPhone OS 3.2 on an original iPad

=== Cut, copy, or paste ===
iPhone OS 3 introduced a "cut, copy, and paste" bubble dialog when users press and hold text. The "paste" button would incorporate anything stored in the device's clipboard into the marked area.

=== Spotlight ===
Spotlight is a system-wide indexing and search feature that helps users search their device for specific contacts, email messages, calendar appointments, multimedia files, apps, and more. It is accessed by swiping to the right from the home screen.

=== VoiceOver ===
VoiceOver is a screen reader accessibility feature for blind or low-vision users that reads the text on the screen. This feature was first introduced with OS X 10.4 Tiger in 2005.

=== Home screen ===
iPhone OS 3 increased the maximum number of home screen pages to 11, for a total of 180 apps.

=== Find My iPhone ===
Users with MobileMe subscriptions could remotely track, lock, and erase their iPhones if they were lost.

== App features ==
=== Messages ===
The Messages app received native support for the Multimedia Messaging Service (MMS), allowing users to send and receive messages that include pictures, contacts, locations, voice recordings, and video.

=== Camera and Photos ===
The Camera app introduced video recording for the iPhone 3GS.

The Photos app featured a new copy button and the ability to delete multiple photos at once.

== Cost ==
Upgrading to iPhone OS 3 was free for iPhone users. Upgrading to iPhone OS 3 originally cost iPod Touch users $9.95; updating to 3.1.x from 2.x cost only $4.95.

iPhone OS 3 was the last major version of iOS for which iPod Touch users had to pay to upgrade. Starting with iOS 4, iOS upgrades became free for all users, including users of the iPod Touch, as the Sarbanes–Oxley Act was revised to allow software upgrades for free with hardware that is not subscription-based.

== Supported devices ==
All devices that supported iPhone OS 1 and 2 support iPhone OS 3; however, only the iPhone 3GS supports video recording.

=== iPhone ===
- iPhone (1st generation)
- iPhone 3G
- iPhone 3GS

=== iPod Touch ===
- iPod Touch (1st generation)
- iPod Touch (2nd generation)
- iPod Touch (3rd generation)

=== iPad ===
- iPad (1st generation)

== Version history ==
| Version | Build | Codename | Release date | Notes |
|---|---|---|---|---|
| 3.0 | 7A341 | Kirkwood | June 17, 2009 | Initial release on iPhone 3GS: Adds cut, copy, and paste for text and images; Adds support for Spotlight search; Adds the Voice Memos application; Allows app developers to access third-party accessories attached to the iPhone; Adds support for in-app purchases; Adds MMS to the Messages app, which replaces the SMS app, for iPhone 3G and iPhone 3GS only; Adds Voice Control for iPhone 3GS only; Fixes a bug where viewing maliciously crafted image files led to arbitrary code execution; Fixes multiple bugs where viewing a maliciously crafted PDF led to arbitrary code execution; Fixes a bug where connecting to a malicious Exchange server allowed disclosure of sensitive information; Fixes a bug where vulnerabilities in racoon led to denial of service; Fixes a bug that allowed someone to initiate a phone call forcefully; Patches a bug where viewing of a maliciously crafted MPEG-4 video caused a device reset; Fixes a bug where clearing Safari search history in Settings did not correctly delete it, and it was still accessible to someone with physical access; Fixes a bug that allowed a remote attacker to initiate a device reset; Fixes multiple bugs where visiting a maliciously crafted website led to cross-site scripting, arbitrary code execution, or a device reset; Adds support for Find My iPhone, allowing users who have purchased a MobileMe subscription to remotely track and erase their iPhone; The appearances of some of the application icons were changed |
| 3.0.1 | 7A400 | Kirkwood | July 31, 2009 | Fixes a bug that allowed a maliciously crafted SMS message to allow arbitrary code execution |
| 3.1; 3.1.1 (Note: iPod Touch (3rd generation) only) | 7C144; 7C145; 7C146 (Note: Re-release of 3.1.1 for iPod Touch (3rd generation) only) | Northstar | September 9, 2009; September 17, 2009 | Allows redeeming of gift cards in the App Store; Improves Bluetooth performance when Wi-Fi is enabled; Allows saving videos from MMS messages and Mail; Allows remote passcode locking of a device if a subscription to MobileMe is purchased; Allows Bluetooth Voice Control on iPhone 3GS only; Triple-clicking the home button opens the Accessibility menu, with options to enable VoiceOver, Zoom, and Invert Colors; Calendar events now display location on the Lock Screen; Allows video trimming to save as a new video, instead of overwriting the original video; Safari will now display a message if a user attempts to visit a potentially fraudulent website; Genius Recommendations now recommend apps in the App Store; Copy+paste can now be copied to the Phone app keypad, letters pasted will be automatically converted to numbers; Fixes a bug where opening a maliciously crafted AAC or MP3 file caused arbitrary code execution; Fixes a bug where deleted Mail messages were still visible in Spotlight Search; Fixes a passcode bypass bug; Fixes a bug that caused passwords to be visible; Fixes a bug that caused website spoofing |
| 3.1.2 | 7D11 | Northstar | October 8, 2009 | Fixes a bug that caused iPhones to not wake from sleep; Fixes a bug that caused cellular connectivity to intermittently disconnect; Fixes a crash that was caused by streaming video |
| 3.1.3 | 7E18 | SUNorthstarTwo | February 2, 2010 | Improves battery percentage accuracy on the iPhone 3GS; Fixes a bug that caused third-party applications to fail to launch; Fixes a bug that caused playback of a maliciously crafted MP4 file to lead to arbitrary code execution; Fixes a bug that caused viewing of a maliciously crafted .tiff file to lead to arbitrary code execution; Fixes a passcode bypass bug |
| iPad (1st generation) only: | | | | |
| 3.2 | 7B367 | Wildcat | April 3, 2010 | Initial release on iPad (1st generation).: Adds performance and experience adjustments for the iPad's larger screen; The Dock has been redesigned to resemble the one on MacOS 10.5.; Adds new Human Interface Guidelines; Allows the Home Screen to rotate to Landscape; Removes the SMS/Messages, Phone, Calculator, Clock, Weather, and Stocks apps |
| 3.2.1 | 7B405 | Wildcat | July 15, 2010 | Fixes a bug that caused poor Wi-Fi connectivity on the iPad (1st generation); Adds support for using Microsoft Bing as a search engine; Improves the reliability of the iPad's video-out capabilities when used with a VGA adapter; Fixes a bug with copy+paste and PDF documents |
| 3.2.2 | 7B500 | Wildcat | August 11, 2010 | Fixes a bug where viewing a maliciously crafted PDF led to arbitrary code execution; Fixes a bug where code running as a user may gain system privileges |

== Reception ==
Reception for iPhone OS 3 was overwhelmingly positive, as it addressed nearly all the major functional features that critics had highlighted since the iPhone's debut. However, it was criticized for being slower on older hardware, adding an upgrade fee for iPod touch users, lacking multitasking, and having terrible carrier dependencies.

| Preceded by iPhone OS 2 | iPhone OS 3; 2009 | Succeeded by iOS 4 |
