= IPod Touch (2nd generation) =

Mobile device made by Apple Inc.

iPod Touch
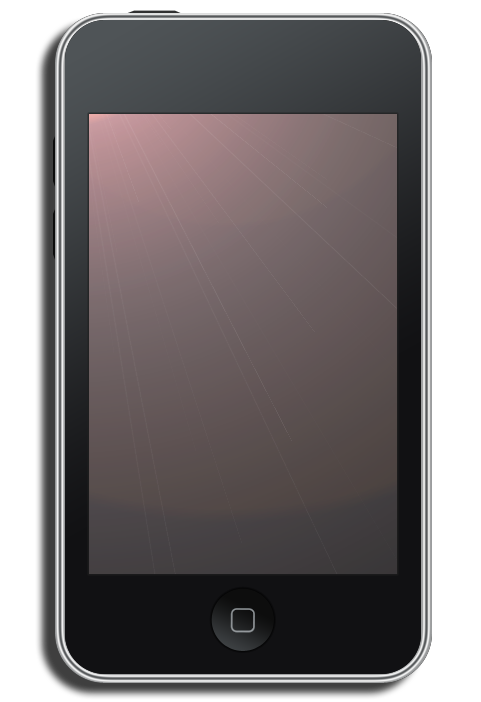
- An iPod touch (2nd generation)
- Developer: Apple Inc.
- Manufacturer: Foxconn
- Product family: iPod
- Type: Mobile device
- Released: September 9, 2008; 18 years ago
- Discontinued: June 7, 2010; 16 years ago
- Operating system: Original: iPhone OS 2.1.1 iPhone OS 3.1 (MC model) Last: iOS 4.2.1, released November 18, 2010
- System on a chip: S5L8720
- CPU: ARMv6 Samsung S5L8720 533 MHz
- Memory: 128 MB DRAM
- Storage: 8, (16, or 32 Only GB Model) GB flash memory
- Display: 3.5 in (89 mm) diagonal (3:2 aspect ratio), multi-touch display, LED backlit TN TFT LCD, 480×320 px at 165 PPI; 800:1 contrast ratio (typical), 500 cd/m^{2} max. brightness (typical)
- Graphics: PowerVR MBX Lite GPU
- Input: Multi-touch touchscreen display; Volume buttons; Built-in speaker; 3-axis Accelerometer; Ambient light sensor
- Connectivity: Wi-Fi 802.11b/g (802.11g 2.4 GHz); Bluetooth 2.1 + EDR; 30-pin dock connector
- Online services: App Store, iTunes Store, iBookstore, MobileMe
- Dimensions: 110 mm (4.3 in) H 58 mm (2.3 in) W 7.1 mm (0.28 in) D
- Weight: 115 g (4.1 oz)
- Predecessor: iPod Touch (1st generation)
- Successor: iPod Touch (3rd generation)
- Related: iPhone 3G

The second-generation iPod Touch (marketed as "the new iPod Touch" and colloquially known as the iPod Touch 2G or iPod Touch 2) is a multi-touch mobile device that was designed and marketed by Apple Inc. with a touchscreen-based user interface. At Apple's media event on September 9, 2008, the company showed off and released the successor to the first-generation iPod Touch. Its introduction marked an important step in Apple's evolution of portable media devices, appealing to a broader audience of music and technology enthusiasts.

== History ==
The second-generation iPod Touch was sold in 8 GB, 16 GB, and 32 GB models. Two revisions of the device exist, with the first revision having a BootROM that was exploitable with 24kPwn and a larger device capacity label on the back.

On September 9, 2009, Apple introduced a revised version of the second-generation iPod touch under the MC model name, which was only available in an 8 GB variant. It featured a newer BootROM version which patched the 24kPwn BootROM exploit and has a smaller device capacity label similar to that of the third-generation iPod touch.

== Features ==
The second-generation iPod Touch showcased a more rounded and sleek design, added volume buttons, enhanced performance, and new features, including a built-in speaker, Nike+iPod integration, and the capability to download apps from the App Store with the initial release of iPhone OS 2.1.1. Bluetooth functionality was enabled in iPhone OS 3.

=== Software ===
It originally shipped with iPhone OS 2 and fully supports iPhone OS 3 but has limited support for iOS 4, similar to the iPhone 3G, and did not receive support for home screen wallpapers and multitasking. Unlike the iPhone 3G, however, it did receive support for Game Center and AirPlay audio streaming. iOS 4.2.1 is the last iOS version supported on this iPod touch model, which was released on November 22, 2010.
