= Weather (Apple) =

Weather forecast application for iOS

- The Weather app on iOS 27 showing current weather information and forecast for Cupertino
- Developer: Apple Inc.
- Operating system: iOS; iPadOS (16.0 or later); macOS (13.0 or later); watchOS
- Type: Weather forecasting

Weather is a weather forecast app developed by Apple Inc., available on iOS since the release of the iPhone and iPhone OS 1 in 2007.

Weather allows users to see the conditions, forecast, temperature, and other related metrics of the device's current location, as well as a number of other cities. A version of Weather is also available for watchOS, but it has limited functionality.

== History ==
Weather was made available on more devices across the Apple ecosystem with the releases of iPadOS 16 and macOS Ventura, where weather data from Apple was previously only available as a widget or through Siri.

From iPhone OS 1 to iOS 7, Yahoo! Weather was used as the weather data source of the app.

In March 2019, Yahoo! shut down the servers distributing data for the Weather app on devices supporting iPhone OS 1 to iOS 7. From iOS 8 to iOS 15, The Weather Channel was used as the weather data source of the app.

Since iOS 16, Apple has used its own internal forecast data.

Following the acquisition on March 31, 2020 of the weather app Dark Sky, many features have been rolled into Apple's own Weather app with the release of iOS 15.

At the beginning of 2023, support for Dark Sky ended, with users being urged to migrate to the Weather app.

== Functionality ==
Locations can be added or removed by pressing the list icon in the bottom right corner of the application, which allows the user to type in the city's name, ZIP or postal code, or airport code.

For each city, the app will display the current, highest, and lowest temperatures, a 10-day forecast, UV index, time of sunrise and sunset, current wind direction and speed, rainfall measurements, current humidity, outdoor visibility range, and barometric pressure.

In some locations, the app will also display an air quality report and show next-hour precipitation when raining or snowing.

iOS 14 introduced support for severe weather warnings, allowing a user to receive notifications for government-issued severe weather events such as tornadoes, flash flooding, strong winds, and snow storms. Severe weather information is available from national weather services for Australia, Brazil, Canada, India, Japan, Mexico, Thailand, the United States, and most of Europe.

With iOS 15, a weather map can be accessed from the bottom left of the application that can display the temperature, air quality, and a multi-day precipitation forecast.

== WeatherKit API ==
WeatherKit is an API integration toolkit that provides third-party developers with access to the Apple Weather service, replacing the former Dark Sky API, which was terminated at the end of March 2023. Developers can make up to half a million API requests per month for no additional cost beyond the 99 USD/year Apple Developer Program fee, with monthly subscription options available to increase the request limit.

== Weather app data source history ==
In 2007, the initial release of the Weather app leveraged the weather data of Yahoo! Weather.

In 2014, seven years later, the weather data of The Weather Channel replaced the weather data of Yahoo! Weather.

In 2022, eight years later, The Weather Channel data was in turn replaced with the weather data used by Apple.

Source	iOS version	Date range	Length
Yahoo! Weather	iPhone OS 1–iOS 7	2007–14	6 or 7 years
The Weather Channel	iOS 8–15	2014–22	7 or 8 years
Apple WeatherKit (formerly Dark Sky)	iOS 16 or later	Since 2022	4 years and 4 months

The macOS and iPadOS versions of Weather also use WeatherKit.

Apple WeatherKit amalgamates data from multiple sources.
