= IPhone (1st generation) =

2007 smartphone by Apple

iPhone

- Developer: Apple
- Manufacturer: Foxconn (contract manufacturer)
- Type: Smartphone
- Series: iPhone
- First released: June 29, 2007; 19 years ago
- Discontinued: July 11, 2008; 18 years ago
- Units sold: 6,124,000
- Successor: iPhone 3G
- Form factor: Slate
- Dimensions: 115 × 61 × 11.6 mm (4.53 × 2.40 × 0.46 in)
- Weight: 135 g (4.8 oz)
- Operating system: Original: iPhone OS 1.0; Last: iPhone OS 3.1.3; Released February 2, 2010; 16 years ago
- Memory: 128 MB eDRAM
- Storage: 4, 8, or 16 GB flash memory
- SIM: Mini SIM
- Battery: 3.7 V 1400 mAh Lithium-ion battery
- Charging: 30-pin Apple proprietary charging
- Rear camera: 2.0 MP with geotagging (not GPS-based)
- Display: 90 mm (3 1/2 in) screen (diagonally); 480 × 320 pixel resolution at 163 ppi; 3:2 aspect ratio; 18-bit (262,144 colors) LCD; 60 Hz refresh rate
- Sound: Single loudspeaker; TRRS headphone jack, 20 Hz to 20 kHz frequency response (internal, headset); Microphone
- Connectivity: Quad-band GSM/GPRS/EDGE (850, 900, 1800, 1900 MHz); Wi-Fi (802.11 b/g); Bluetooth 2.0; USB 2.0/proprietary 30-pin dock connector
- Data inputs: Multi-touch touchscreen display; 3-axis accelerometer; Proximity sensor; Ambient light sensor; Microphone; Headset controls
- Website: Apple – iPhone at the Wayback Machine (archived June 29, 2007)

The iPhone (Note: Sometimes retroactively referred to as the iPhone 2G or iPhone 1) is a smartphone developed and marketed by Apple as the first device in the iPhone lineup of smartphones. It features a Samsung S5L8900 SoC (90 nm), a 3.5 in multi-touch display, and a web browser (Safari). After years of rumors and speculation, it was officially announced on January 9, 2007, and was released in the United States on June 29, 2007.

Development of the iPhone began in 2005 and continued in secrecy until its public unveiling at Macworld 2007. The device broke with prevailing mobile phone designs by eliminating most physical hardware buttons, and relying on a finger-friendly touchscreen interface that did not need a stylus. The iPhone featured quad-band GSM cellular connectivity with GPRS and EDGE support for data transfer, and it used continuous internet access and onboard processing to support features unrelated to voice communication.

The iPhone generated much hype before release and quickly became Apple's most successful product, although it was met with less enthusiasm in European territories. At the time, the iPhone appealed largely to the general public, as opposed to the business community, upon which BlackBerry and IBM were primarily focused. By integrating existing technology and expanding on usability, the iPhone turned the smartphone industry "on its head", and later generations of the iPhone propelled Apple to become one of the world's most profitable companies. Its successor, the iPhone 3G, was announced on June 9, 2008.

== Development history ==
In 2000, Apple CEO Steve Jobs envisioned an Apple touchscreen product that the user could interact with directly with their fingers rather than using a stylus. The stylus was a common tool for many existing touchscreen devices at the time including Apple's own Newton, launched in 1993. He decided that the device would require a triple layered capacitive multi-touch touch screen, a very new and advanced technology at the time. This helped with removing the physical keyboard and mouse. The same as was common at the time for tablet computers, human machine interfaces, and point of sale systems. Jobs recruited a group of Apple engineers to investigate the idea as a side project. When Jobs reviewed the prototype and its user interface, he saw the potential in developing the concept into a mobile phone to compete with already established brands in the then emerging market for touch screen phones. The whole effort was called Project Purple 2 and began in 2005. Apple had purchased the "iphone.org" domain in December 1999.

Apple created the device in a secretive and unprecedented collaboration with Cingular Wireless, now part of AT&T. The development cost of the collaboration was estimated to have been $150 million over a thirty-month period. Apple rejected the "design by committee" approach that had yielded the Motorola ROKR E1, a largely unsuccessful collaboration with Motorola. Instead, Cingular Wireless gave Apple the liberty to develop the iPhone's hardware and software in-house. The original iPhone was introduced by Steve Jobs on January 9, 2007, in a keynote address at the Macworld Conference & Expo held in Moscone West in San Francisco, California. In his address, Jobs said, "This is a day that I have been looking forward to for two and a half years," and that "today, Apple is going to reinvent the phone". Jobs introduced the iPhone as a combination of three devices: a "widescreen iPod with touch controls"; a "revolutionary mobile phone"; and a "breakthrough Internet communicator."

Six weeks prior to the iPhone's release, the plastic screen was replaced with glass. This was after Jobs was upset when he saw that his keys scratched the prototype in his pocket. The fast switch led to a bidding process for a manufacturing contractor that was won by Foxconn, which had just opened up a new wing of its Shenzhen factory complex specifically for this bid. Apple partnered with Corning on the glass.

== Release and performance ==
=== Initial release ===
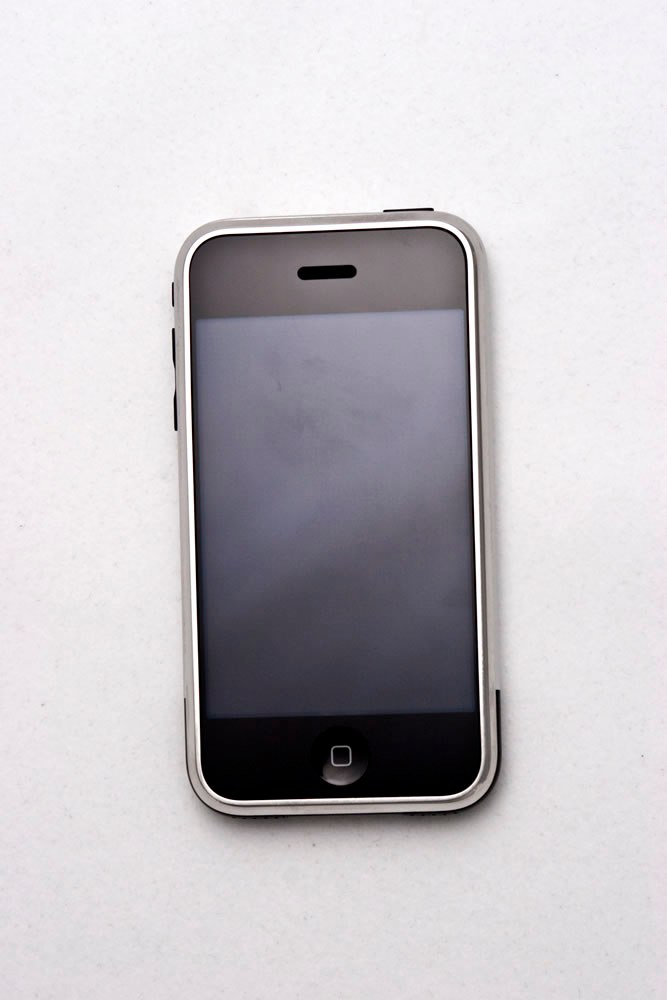
An 8 GB iPhone

Six out of ten Americans surveyed said they knew before the release that the iPhone was coming. The iPhone was released in the United States on June 29, 2007, at the price of $499 for the 4 GB model and $599 for the 8 GB model, both requiring a 2-year contract. Thousands of people were reported to have waited outside Apple and AT&T retail stores days before the device's launch; many stores reported stock shortages within an hour of availability.

Sales to the European market started in November 2007, first in Germany, followed by Britain and then France. Reports suggested that these launches were met with less enthusiasm. In France it was sold by Orange for 649 euros. The iPhone was released in Austria and the Republic of Ireland on March 13, 2008.

In Canada, Rogers Wireless announced in April 2008 that a deal was reached with Apple to bring the iPhone to the Canadian market. The original iPhone was eventually not released in Canada in favor of the second-generation iPhone 3G.

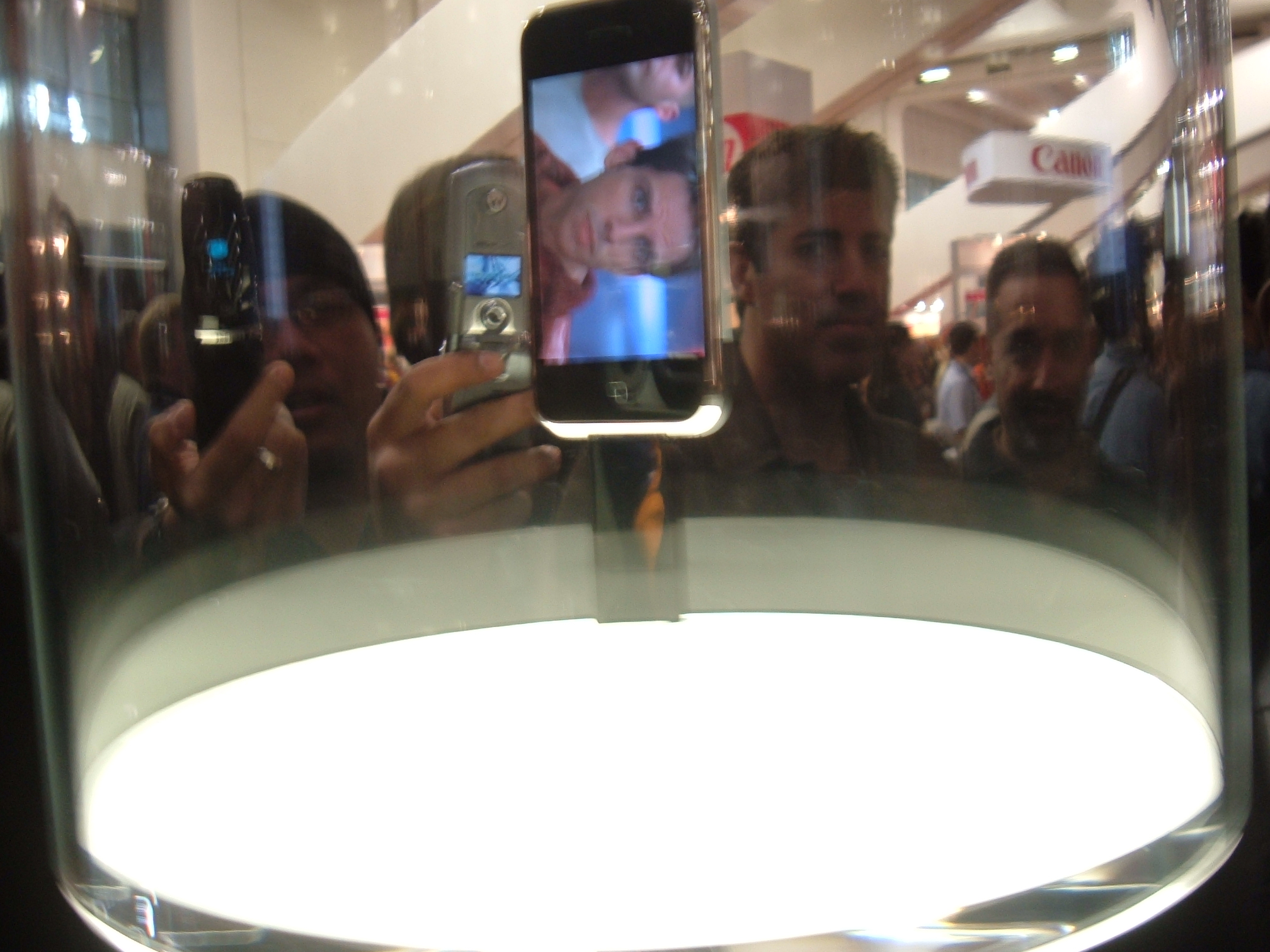
First iPhone on display under glass at Macworld 2007

=== Post-release ===
The iPhone's main competitors in both consumer and business markets were considered to be the LG Prada, LG Viewty, Samsung Ultra Smart F700, Nokia N95, Nokia E61i, Palm Treo 750, Palm Centro, HTC Touch, Sony Ericsson W960, Sony Ericsson C905 and BlackBerry.

==== Price drops and revisions ====
The iPod Touch, a touchscreen device with the media and internet abilities and interface of the iPhone but without the ability to connect to a cellular network for phone functions or internet access, was released on September 5, 2007. At the same time, Apple significantly dropped the price of the iPhone 8 GB model from $599 to $399 (still requiring a 2-year contract with AT&T) while discontinuing the $499 4 GB model. After receiving "hundreds of emails" upset about the price drop, Apple gave a $100 store credit to early adopters.

A 16 GB model was released on February 5, 2008, for $499, the original launch price of the 4 GB model. Apple released an SDK on March 6, 2008, allowing developers to create the apps that would be available starting in iPhone OS version 2.0, a free upgrade for iPhone users. On June 9, Apple announced the iPhone 3G, which began shipping July 11.

=== Sales ===
In its first week, Apple sold 270,000 iPhones domestically. Apple sold its one millionth iPhone 74 days after release. Apple reported in January 2008 that four million had been sold. By Q4 2007, strong iPhone sales put Apple at second place among U.S. smartphone vendors, behind Research In Motion and ahead of all Windows Mobile vendors.

By October 2007, the iPhone was the fourth-best-selling handset in the U.S., trailing the Motorola Razr V3, the LG Chocolate, and the LG VX8300.

Compared to the United States, European sales were "sluggish". Although Apple partners called its British weekend launch successful, the Register called it a "flop". According to an analyst, iPhone per-capita sales were one quarter that of the United States and it was reportedly outsold by the LG Viewty. In France, the device reportedly sold 30,000 units in its first week, three times as many as were sold in Germany (10,000).

The original iPhone was discontinued on July 11, 2008; total sales volume came to 6,124,000 units. It was the first model to be neither released nor discontinued in September unlike the iPhone 4 and later, however the iPhone 8 and 8 Plus as well as the iPhone 14 and 14 Plus were discontinued earlier than September.

== Reception and legacy ==
=== Critical reception ===
The iPhone received largely positive reviews. Only four writers were given review models of the iPhone: David Pogue of The New York Times, Walt Mossberg of The Wall Street Journal, Steven Levy of Newsweek, and Ed Baig of USA Today. The New York Times and The Wall Street Journal published positive, but cautious, reviews of the iPhone, their primary criticisms being the relatively slow speed of AT&T's 2.5G EDGE network and the phone's inability to connect using 3G services. The Wall Street Journal's technology columnist, Walt Mossberg, concluded that "despite some flaws and feature omissions, the iPhone is, on balance, a beautiful and breakthrough handheld computer." Time magazine named it the Invention of the Year in 2007.

The British publication Mobile Phones UK (later S21) reviewed the iPhone upon its local launch in November 2007 and gave it a rating of 5 out of 5, having been "blown away" by the phone's user interface. However the review was lambasted by many readers who felt that it was unbalanced. Taking the feedback on board, the site revised the rating to a final 3 out of 5, commenting "With hindsight, 5 stars was wrong." Another UK-based publication, Mobile Gazette, wrote that "Although it has many good points, the list of bad points is equally impressive." It also added "Although the iPhone sold well in the US, when it finally hit Europe sales were not as high as expected, to an extent because European consumers could understand the drawbacks due to a more competitive marketplace." Ars Technica wrote an early review as well, in which it expresses optimism for the technology, the touchscreen experience, the web browsing and the music player functionality, but also highlights the lack of some features like GPS, a decent email client, limited connectivity and no third-party SDK.

Steve Ballmer, the former CEO of Microsoft, argued in 2007 that the first-generation iPhone “is the most expensive phone in the world and it doesn't have a keyboard”, and argued that the 1st gen iPhone was too expensive even with a carrier subsidy and a carrier plan.

=== Legacy ===
The iPhone was the first of the long-running iPhone line of products that continue to this day, which helped Apple to become one of the world's most valuable companies. The first generation iPhone's successor, iPhone 3G, was announced on June 9, 2008. On the same day, Apple also introduced the App Store which allowed established companies and startup developers to build careers and earn money, via the platform, while providing retail consumers with new ways to access information and connect with other people.

More broadly, the release of the iPhone was the beginning of a shift of smartphones away from the push-button keyboards of the BlackBerry and Palm Treo, towards touchscreen-focused designs with minimal front-facing buttons, mimicking the iPhone. While the LG Prada, a feature phone with a large capacitative touchscreen, was released in March 2007, the iPhone was the first large-touchscreen phone with multi-touch and with full mobile rendering of websites, features which have now become virtually universal in smartphones. (The last push-button successor of the Treo, the HP Veer, was discontinued in 2011, and the BlackBerry was sold off by parent company BlackBerry Limited in 2016 before being discontinued in 2020. Since then, the only smartphones with push-button keyboards have been niche products such as Unihertz phones.) It also marked the beginning of the massive growth of the smartphone market, which expanded from the business and other professional users who had been the predominant users of the BlackBerry to include the general public.

While it was marketed as a smartphone by Apple, a number of publications at the time and in retrospect have stated that the first generation iPhone was in essence not a smartphone due to the fact that it did not feature the ability to install third-party apps. The technology market intelligence firm ABI Research had stated, after the iPhone's announcement: "we must conclude at this point that based on our current definition of a smartphone that the Apple iPhone is not a smartphone. It is a very high-end feature phone." The App Store download marketplace, which opened a third-party ecosystem, did not release until the next year alongside the second generation iPhone, iPhone 3G.

In July 2023, an unopened, first edition model of the 2007 4 GB iPhone was sold at auction in the US for $190,372.80, nearly 400 times the original price.

== Hardware ==
=== External hardware (screens, materials, etc) ===
The iPhone's back cover is made out of aluminum, a soft metal. The iPhone's screen is a 320×480-resolution LCD screen at 163 ppi that measures about 3.5 inches (89 mm) diagonally, much bigger than most other phones at the time, and the iPhone was the first mobile phone with multi-touch technology. The screen's refresh rate is 60 Hz. The rear camera on the iPhone has a resolution of 2 megapixels and also features geotagging. The iPhone has four total buttons and a single switch: a power and sleep button, a volume up and volume down button, a silent/ringer switch, and a home button positioned in the bottom center of the face of the phone. The home button, when pressed, would send the user back to the home screen from whatever app they were currently using.

=== Internal hardware (motherboard, system-on-chip, etc.) ===
The iPhone features a Samsung 32-bit ARM microprocessor, underclocked from its stock 620 MHz to a slower 412 MHz to increase battery life. Its GPU is the PowerVR MBX Lite 3D.

The iPhone also includes several sets of sensors, including an accelerometer, a proximity sensor, and an ambient light sensor. Similar to the iPod Touch, the iPhone also features a 3.5 millimeter auxiliary headphone jack. The phone has a 3.7 V 1400 mAh lithium-ion battery built in it.

== Software ==
At the time of its unveiling in January, Steve Jobs claimed: "iPhone runs OS X" and runs "desktop-class applications", but at the time of the iPhone's release, the operating system was renamed "iPhone OS".

The original iPhone supported three major versions of the operating system before it was discontinued: iPhone OS 1, 2, and 3. The last update the original iPhone received was iPhone OS 3.1.3, as iPhone OS 3.2 was intended for the iPad.

=== Software history ===
The original operating system for the original iPhone, iPhone OS 1, featured Visual Voicemail, multi-touch gestures, HTML email, Apple's Safari web browser, threaded text messaging, a music and video player app named "iPod" (its features would later be included in the Music and Apple TV apps), a dedicated YouTube app and a Maps app powered by Google Maps, however without proper GPS support. It also included basic Phone/contacts, Calendar, Photos, Stocks, Weather, Clock, Calculator, Notes, and Settings apps. However, many features like MMS, apps, and copy and paste were not supported at release, leading hackers to jailbreak their phones to add these features. By jailbreaking, it was also possible to overcome the lack of a native GPS module with the Navizon app, which used WiFi and cell-tower positioning, to give users access to real time location, otherwise impossible. Software updates from Apple gradually added these functions.

A v1.1 update alongside the introduction of the iPod Touch in September 2007 included an iTunes Store app that was the first new app to be added to the system.

iPhone OS 2 was released on July 11, 2008, at the same time as the release of the iPhone 3G, and introduced Apple's App Store supporting native third-party applications (that were developed with the iPhone SDK), Microsoft Exchange support, push e-mail, and other enhancements.

iPhone OS 3 was released on June 17, 2009, alongside the iPhone 3GS, and introduced copy and paste support, Spotlight search for the home screen, and new features for the YouTube app. iPhone OS 3 was available for the original iPhone as well as the iPhone 3G and 3GS. However, not all features of iPhone OS 3 (such as MMS in the Messages app) were supported on the original iPhone.

iPhone OS 3.1.3 was the last version of iPhone OS (now iOS) to be released for the phone in February 2010, which never got the full iPhone OS 3 feature set because iPhone OS 3.2 was intended for the iPad.

Almost all apps released after the release of iOS 6 in late September 2012 do not run on the original iPhone, as the software development kit (SDK) was changed to no longer allow the "targeting" (minimum) of iOS versions older than 4.3 (including 3.x), or ARMv6 devices (first two generations).

== See also ==
- 300-page iPhone bill
- Apple Newton
- History of iPhone
- List of iOS devices
- Motorola Rokr E1
- Timeline of iPhone models

== Notes ==
New creation	iPhone; 1st generation	Succeeded by iPhone 3G
