= IPod Touch (1st generation) =

Mobile device made by Apple Inc

iPod Touch
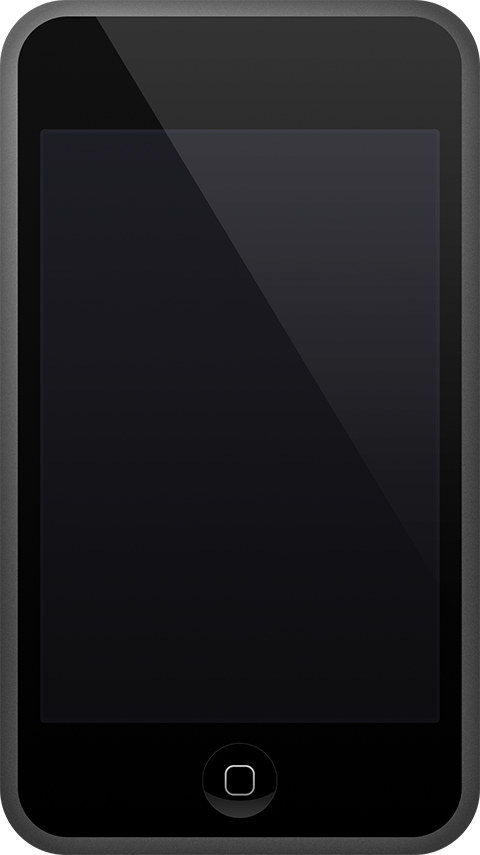
- A first-generation iPod touch
- Developer: Apple Inc.
- Manufacturer: Foxconn
- Product family: iPod
- Type: Mobile device
- Released: September 5, 2007; 19 years ago
- Discontinued: September 9, 2008; 18 years ago
- Operating system: Original: iPhone OS 1.1; Last: iPhone OS 3.1.3, released February 2, 2010
- System on a chip: S5L8900
- CPU: ARMv6 Samsung S5L8900 400/412 MHz
- Memory: 128 MB DRAM
- Storage: 8, 16, or 32 GB flash memory
- Display: 3.5 in (89 mm) diagonal (3:2 aspect ratio), multi-touch display, LED backlit TN TFT LCD, 480×320 px at 165 PPI; 800:1 contrast ratio (typical), 500 cd/m^{2} max. brightness (typical)
- Graphics: PowerVR PowerVR MBX LITE GPU
- Input: Multi-touch touchscreen display; Built-in piezoelectric speaker; 3-axis Accelerometer; Ambient Light Sensor
- Connectivity: Wi-Fi 802.11b/g (802.11g 2.4 GHz); 30-pin dock connector
- Online services: App Store, iTunes Store, iBookstore, MobileMe
- Dimensions: 110 mm (4.3 in) H 58 mm (2.3 in) W 7.1 mm (0.28 in) D
- Weight: 115 g (4.1 oz)
- Predecessor: iPod Classic
- Successor: iPod Touch (2nd generation)
- Related: iPhone (1st generation)

The first-generation iPod Touch, (colloquially known as the iPod Touch 1G, iPod Touch 1, or original iPod Touch) is a multi-touch mobile device designed and marketed by Apple Inc. with a touchscreen-based user interface. The first device of the iPod Touch series, it was unveiled and released at Apple's media event on September 5, 2007. It is compatible with up to iPhone OS 3.1.3 which was released on February 2, 2010.

== History ==
The first-generation iPod touch was released after the first-generation iPhone as a companion device. It had similar features, but a thinner design with an all-metal back except for a small corner cut out for WiFi 802.11 b/g, allowing it to use Safari to browse websites. It used the same 30-pin connector as the first-generation iPhone and previous iPods, allowing most iPod accessories to work with the iPod touch. Unlike the iPhone, the iPod Touch does not have a speaker or a camera. Due to the lack of a speaker, system, notification, and alarm sounds were played with a piezoelectric buzzer.

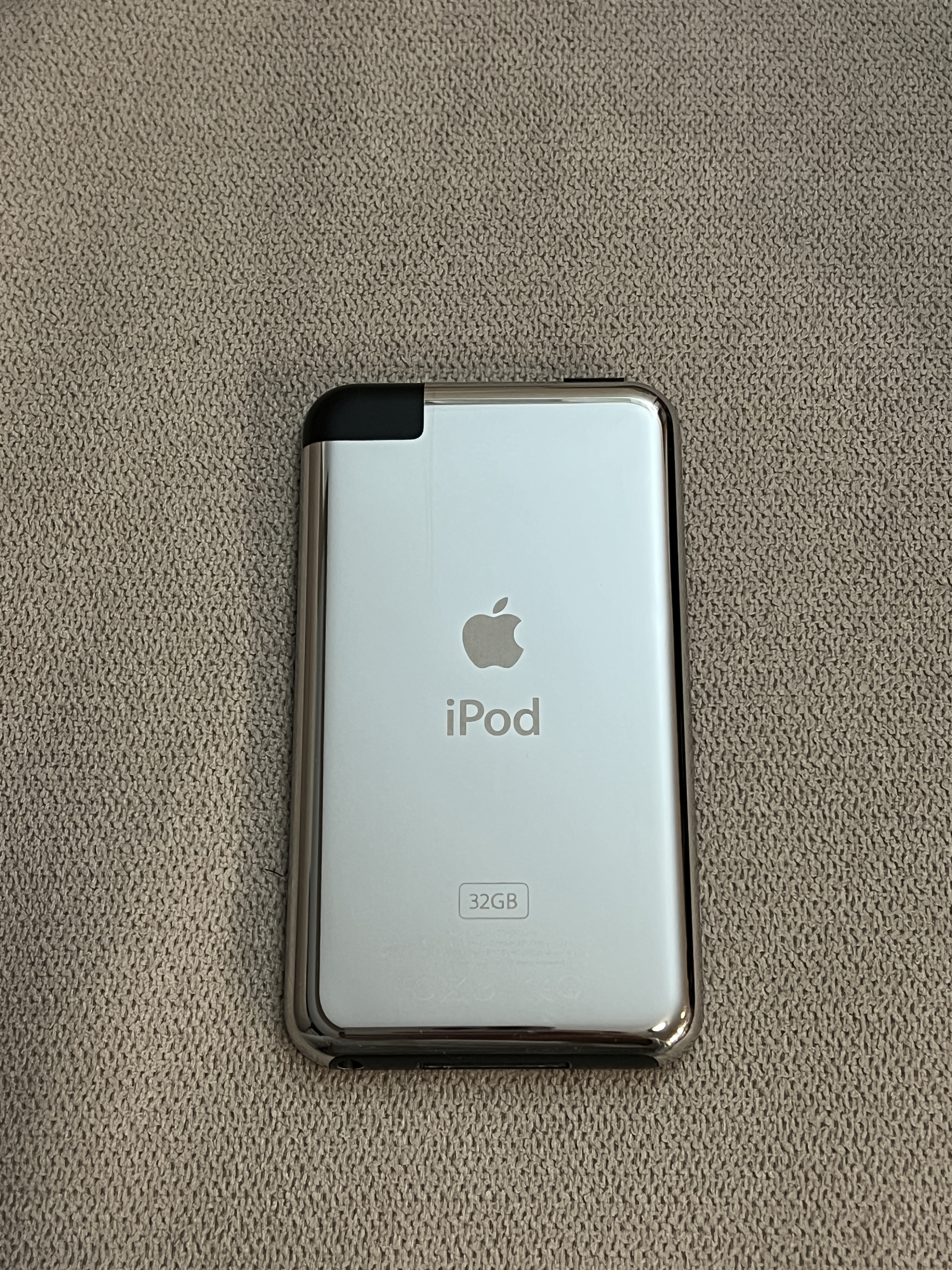
The back of a first-generation iPod touch 32GB

== Features ==
=== Software ===
It fully supports iPhone OS 1 to iPhone OS 3, though it received different features at different times from the first-generation iPhone. It also did not have the iPod app as it was an iPod, and instead had the Music app for playing music and podcasts, with a separate Videos app to watch videos. It also received the iTunes Store app before the iPhone did - the first-generation iPod touch received the iTunes Store app on launch with iPhone OS 1.1 on September 14, 2007, while the first-generation iPhone received the iTunes Store app on September 27, 2007, with the release of iPhone OS 1.1.1. It also had Calendar, Clock, Calculator, and Photos apps preinstalled.

The iPhone OS 2.0 update introduced the App Store, but unlike the iPhone, it was not available for free, instead costing $9.95 to upgrade from 1.1.x. iPhone OS 3.0 continued to cost $9.95, but the price was lowered to $4.95 when iPhoneOS 3.1 came out. Free iOS updates were not available on the iPod touch until iOS 4, which is not supported on this model.

An unofficial port of Android 2.3 Gingerbread called iDroid supports the first-generation iPod touch.

== Emulation ==
In December 2022, Internet user Martijn de Vos, also known as devos50, has reverse engineered this device to successfully create a QEMU emulation of this device, running iPhone OS 1.0.
