= IPhone OS 1 =

2007 mobile operating system

iPhone OS 1
- Version of the iOS operating system

- iPhone OS 1.0 home screen on a first-generation iPhone
- Developer: Apple
- Working state: No longer supported
- Source model: Closed, with open source components
- Initial release: June 29, 2007; 19 years ago
- Latest release: 1.1.5 (4B1) / July 15, 2008; 18 years ago
- Update method: iTunes
- Supported platforms: iPhone (1st generation) and iPod Touch (1st generation)
- Kernel type: Hybrid (XNU)
- License: Proprietary software
- Succeeded by: iPhone OS 2
- Official website: Apple - iPhone at the Wayback Machine (archived June 7, 2007)

Support status
- Obsolete, unsupported

iPhone OS 1 is the first major release of the iOS mobile operating system developed by Apple. It was released on June 29, 2007, along with the first-generation iPhone. It was succeeded by iPhone OS 2 on July 11, 2008.

== History ==
=== Development history ===
The development of iPhone OS 1.0 and the first generation of iPhone hardware was a combined effort. Only employees from within Apple were allowed to be a part of the iPhone development team. It was a completely secret project, and when the team was selected, they weren't even told what they would be working on. There were two teams inside Apple that worked on creating the iPhone: one worked on converting the iPod into a phone and the other worked on compressing the Mac OS X operating system to make it work on smaller devices like phones. A team led by Jon Rubinstein worked on developing a lightweight Linux-based version, commonly referred to as Acorn, while another team led by Scott Forstall worked on developing a more compressed and streamlined version of Mac OS X, codenamed Purple, to run on the ARM chipset. Tony Fadell, who then led the iPhone team said "It was a competing set of ideas, not teams, and we were all working on it". There were 16 to 17 different concepts. Many people on the team were still hung up on the idea that everyone would want to type on a hardware keyboard, not a glass one. The idea of introducing a fully touchscreen system was considered very novel at the time. Many user interfaces were prototyped, including the multi-touch click-wheel. Although many thought it was a waste of time, Apple CEO Steve Jobs insisted on prototyping all concepts/ideas before the Mac OS X-based version of the operating system was selected.

=== Introduction and release ===
iPhone OS was introduced at the Macworld Conference & Expo at the Moscone Convention Center in San Francisco, in a keynote address by Steve Jobs on January 9, 2007, along with the original iPhone. At the time, Jobs only said the iPhone "runs OS X,” and according to Chicago Sun-Times columnist Andy Ihnatko, this was confirmed in official briefings and unofficial conversations.

iPhone OS 1.0 was released alongside the original iPhone, on June 29, 2007.

The iPhone OS 1.1.3 update cost $19.95 for iPod Touch users.

== Apps ==
iPhone OS 1 did not have any app store or a software development kit for third-party developers to create native applications. Instead, Apple directed developers to create web apps which could be accessed from Safari, at the time the only web browser available on iPhone.

The home screen was not able to be edited without jailbreaking prior to iPhone OS 1.1.3. Web Clips were also added in the iPhone OS 1.1.3 update, allowing users to add their own icons to the home screen for the first time.

== Supported devices ==
- iPhone (1st generation)
- iPod Touch (1st generation)

== Version history ==
Version	Release date	Major changes	Ref
1.0	June 29, 2007	Initial release for the original iPhone.: Interface: pinch-to-zoom, inertial scrolling, multitouch gestures, software keyboard; Visual voicemail; Sync with iTunes; Major apps: iPod, Safari, Google Maps	
1.0.1	July 31, 2007	Adds the ability to automatically BCC oneself on every outgoing email	
1.0.2	August 21, 2007	Minor update	
1.1	September 14, 2007	Initial version for the iPod Touch (1st generation), not released for the iPhone (1st generation): Adds the iTunes Wi-Fi Music Store app, allowing on-device purchase of music, movies, and ringtones.; The Dock on the bottom of the Home Screen has a different appearance that is similar to the one in Mac OS X Leopard.; The Calculator icon was changed.	
1.1.1	September 27, 2007	Adds the iTunes Wi-Fi Music Store app to the original iPhone.; The Calculator icon was changed for the iPhone.	
1.1.2	November 12, 2007	Minor update: Fixes a crash while opening the iPod app	
1.1.3	January 15, 2008	Home screen can be rearranged; Websites can be pinned to the home screen as Web Clips; Adds pins, satellite view, and traffic information to Maps; Text messages can now be sent to multiple numbers; Applications now run as 'mobile' rather than 'root'; (First generation iPod touch only) The Dock now has the same appearance that it has on the iPhone.	
1.1.4	February 26, 2008	Minor update	
1.1.5	July 15, 2008	Only released for the first generation iPod touch for users unwilling to pay $9.95 to update to 2.0	

== Reception ==
iPhone OS 1 was hailed as a revolutionary, albeit limited, touch-based interface that redefined mobile computing. Critics praised its multi-touch gestures and the addition of Safari and Visual Voicemail. However, they noted that it lacks cut, copy, and paste and does not support third-party apps.

Preceded by –	iPhone OS 1; 2007	Succeeded by iPhone OS 2
