= IPod Touch (3rd generation) =

Mobile device made by Apple Inc.

iPod Touch
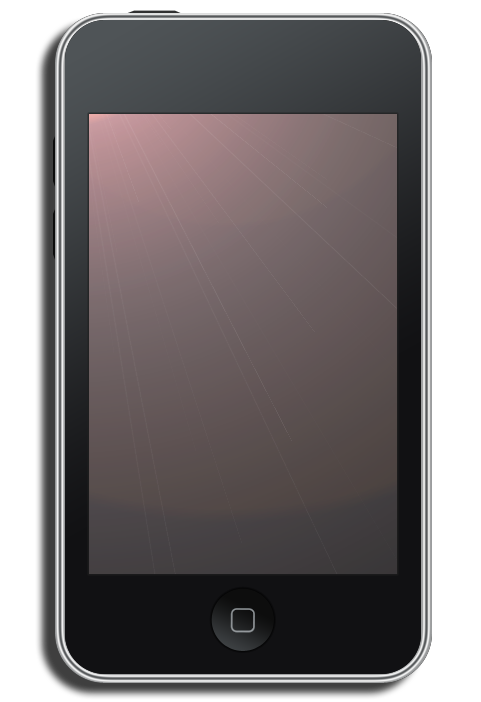
- A black iPod touch (3rd generation)
- Developer: Apple Inc.
- Manufacturer: Foxconn
- Product family: iPod
- Type: Mobile device
- Released: September 9, 2009
- Discontinued: September 1, 2010; 16 years ago
- Operating system: Original: iPhone OS 3.1; Last: iOS 5.1.1, released May 7, 2012 iOS 6.1.6 (unofficial)
- System on a chip: S5L8922
- CPU: ARMv7-A32 Samsung S5L8922 600 MHz
- Memory: 256 MB DRAM
- Storage: 32 or 64 GB flash memory
- Display: 3.5 in (89 mm) diagonal (3:2 aspect ratio), multi-touch display, LED backlit TN TFT LCD, 480×320 px at 163 PPI; 200:1 contrast ratio (typical), 500 cd/m^{2} max. brightness (typical), Fingerprint-resistant oleophobic coating on front
- Graphics: PowerVR SGX535 GPU
- Input: Multi-touch touchscreen display; Volume buttons; Built-in speaker; Voice control; 3-axis Accelerometer; Ambient Light Sensor
- Connectivity: Wi-Fi 802.11b/g; Bluetooth 2.1 + EDR; 30-pin dock connector
- Online services: App Store, iTunes Store, iBookstore, iCloud, MobileMe
- Dimensions: 110 mm (4.3 in) H 61.8 mm (2.43 in) W 8.5 mm (0.33 in) D
- Weight: 115 g (4.1 oz)
- Predecessor: iPod Touch (2nd generation)
- Successor: iPod Touch (4th generation)
- Related: iPhone 3GS

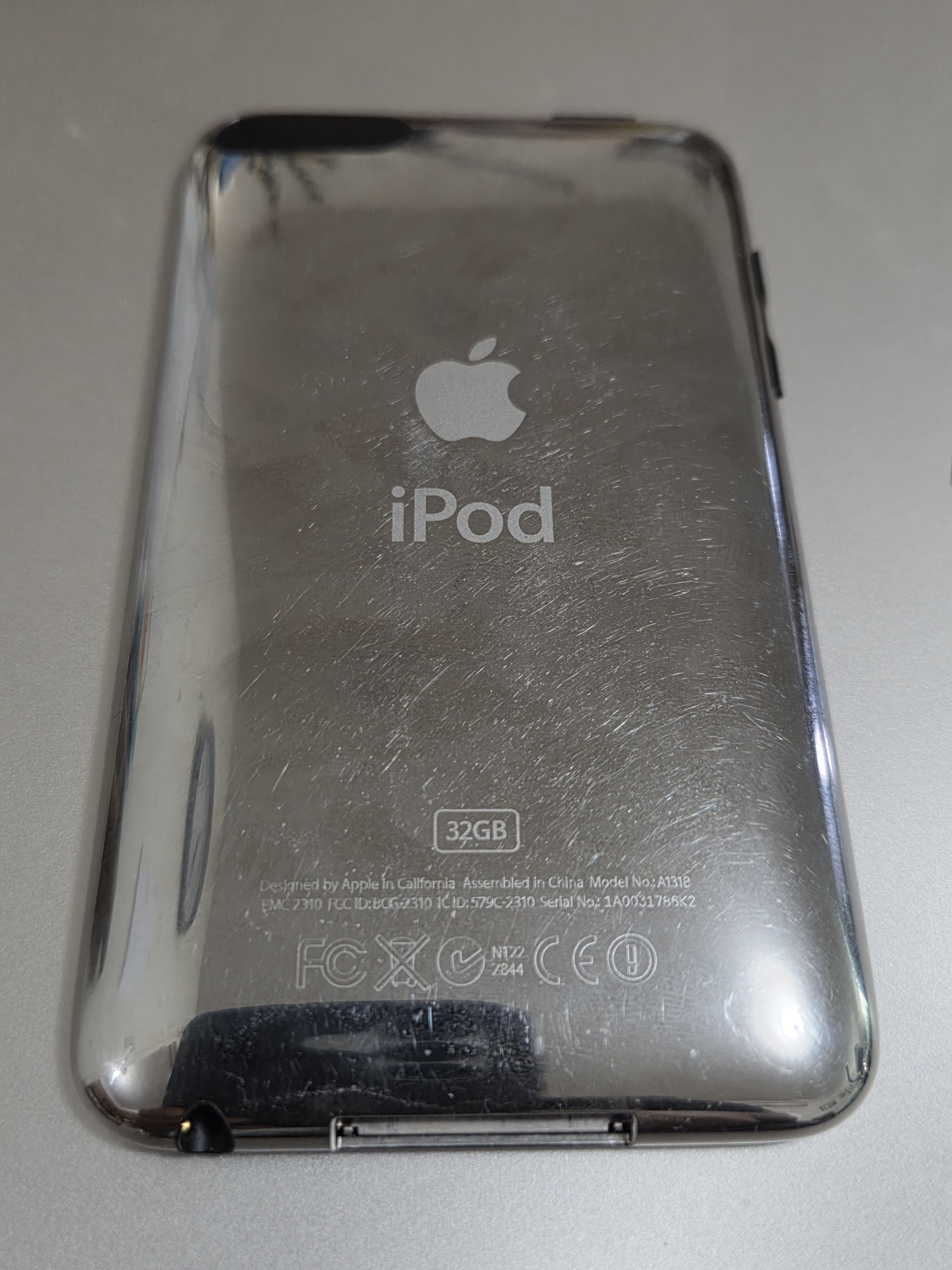
The back of the iPod touch 3rd-generation (32GB). Model A1318

The third-generation iPod Touch (marketed as "the new iPod Touch" and commonly referred to as the iPod Touch 3G, iPod Touch 3, or iPod 3) is a multi-touch mobile device developed and sold by Apple Inc. It features a touchscreen-based user interface, and serves as the direct successor to the second-generation iPod Touch.

== History ==
=== Development ===
Before the launch, leaks of the iPod touch 3rd generation began circulating online, showcasing a camera positioned at the top centre of the rear panel, which was absent on the final design. Rumours speculated that the 3rd-generation iPod touch would have the capability to support both photo and video recording. In Q3 of 2010, a few 3rd-generation iPod touch prototypes with cameras were listed on eBay for a short period of time before they were taken down due to copyright issues. This became apparent when numerous case manufacturers were observed selling various cases for the iPod touch 3rd generation in retail stores, including Best Buy, which had adopted the same rear-centred camera design as shown in the leaks. According to MacRumors, an iFixit teardown of the 3rd-generation iPod touch revealed strong evidence that the prototype was designed to include a camera and an external microphone. In contrast, the final product displayed an empty space where the camera was meant to be installed.

Before its release, many speculations about Apple's next-generation iPod Touch were expecting it to include a camera in the final production, but it was ultimately removed at the last minute due to manufacturing issues.

=== Release ===
On September 9, 2009, Apple quietly introduced the 3rd-generation iPod Touch, alongside a revised version of the 2nd-generation iPod touch, known as the "MC model," although Apple did not explicitly mention this. The 3rd-generation iPod touch maintained the same design as its predecessor, featuring no external changes. It was available exclusively in 32 GB and 64 GB models, in contrast to the second-generation iPod touch, which only offered an 8 GB configuration and started at $199.

The iPod touch 3rd generation (32 GB and 64 GB) shares the same specs as the iPhone 3GS and came with a range of new features that weren't offered in previous models, such as voice control (which can only be accessible using a remote control mic), accessibility, and a faster processor. Performance was bumped up from 128 MB to 256 MB of RAM, and graphics were upgraded to the new OpenGL ES 2.0 for a better gaming experience.

Due to the quiet unveiling and confusion, some resellers later sold and mistitled the 8 GB iPod Touch (2nd generation) as the iPod Touch (3rd generation), but this error was neither done nor condoned by Apple. Just like the iPod Touch (2nd generation), the 8 GB "iPod Touch (2nd generation)" (late 2009 models) was only supported up to iOS 4.2.1, whereas the 32 GB and 64 GB (3rd generation) iPod Touches were supported all the way up to iOS 5.1.1.

== Features ==
=== Software ===
The iPod Touch 3rd generation, which originally shipped with iPhone OS 3, also fully supports iOS 4 and runs iOS 5; however, it does not support Siri. The last version supported on this device was iOS 5.1.1, which was released on May 7, 2012. Unlike the iPhone 3GS, it did not get the iOS 6 update, likely due to not having a camera despite sharing similar specs.

In 2025, the iOS 6 firmware was unofficially ported to the iPod Touch 3rd generation by a developer using modified firmware from the iPhone 3GS.

== Reception ==
On launch, the 3rd generation iPod touch was generally praised for its technical features, but was believed by some reviewers to not differ significantly from the previous generation iPod touch.
