= IPhone 3G =

2008 Apple smartphone

iPhone 3G
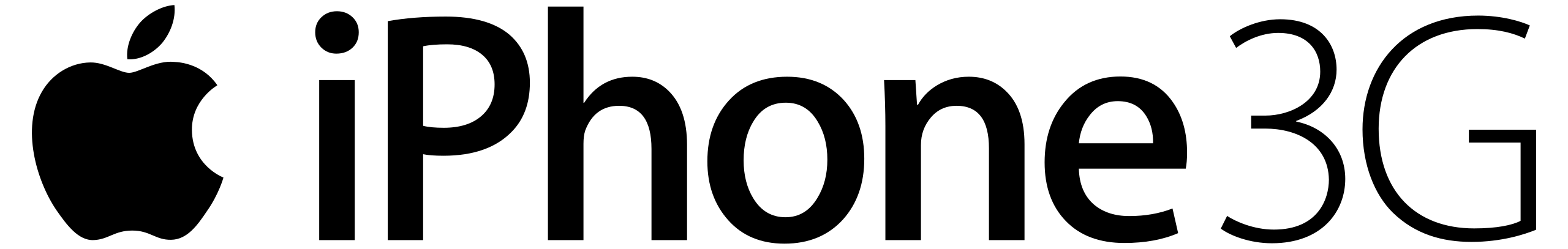

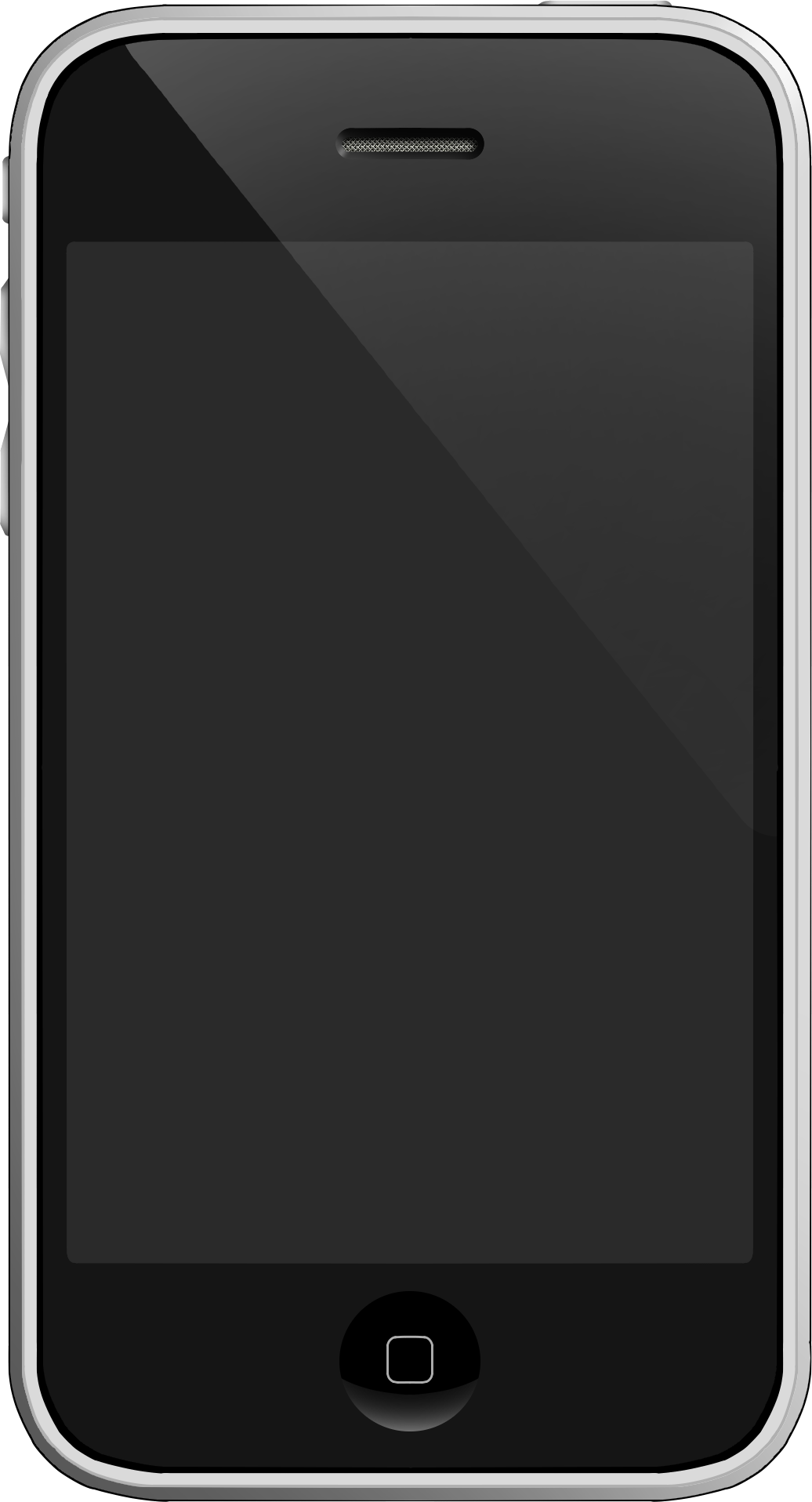
- Front view
- Developer: Apple
- Manufacturer: Foxconn (contract manufacturer)
- Type: Smartphone
- Series: iPhone
- First released: July 11, 2008; 18 years ago
- Discontinued: June 7, 2010; 16 years ago
- Units sold: 1 million over first weekend 30 million over all time
- Predecessor: iPhone (1st generation)
- Successor: iPhone 3GS
- Related: iPod Touch (2nd generation)
- Form factor: Slate
- Dimensions: 115.5 mm (4.55 in) H 62.1 mm (2.44 in) W 12.3 mm (0.48 in) D
- Weight: 133 g (4.7 oz)
- Operating system: Original: iPhone OS 2.0; Last: iOS 4.2.1, released November 22, 2010
- CPU: Samsung 32-bit RISC ARM 1176JZ(F)-S v1.0 620 MHz; Underclocked to 412 MHz
- GPU: PowerVR MBX Lite 3D GPU
- Memory: 128 MB DRAM
- Storage: 8 or 16 GB flash memory
- Battery: 1150 mAh, 3.7 V Lithium-ion battery
- Rear camera: 2.0 MP with geotagging
- Display: 3.5-inch screen (diagonally); 480×320 pixel resolution at 163 ppi 3:2 aspect ratio 18-bit (262,144 colors) LCD
- Sound: 3.5 mm TRRS; One speaker 20 Hz to 20 kHz frequency response (internal, headset); Microphone
- Connectivity: Quad-band GSM/GPRS/EDGE (850 900 1,800 1,900 MHz); Tri-band UMTS/HSDPA 3.6 (850 1,900 2,100 MHz); Wi-Fi (802.11 b/g); Bluetooth 2.0 + EDR; USB 2.0/Dock connector
- Data inputs: Multi-touch touchscreen display 3-axis accelerometer Proximity sensor Ambient light sensor Microphone; Headset controls
- Model: A1324 (China); A1241
- Made in: China
- Website: Apple – iPhone at the Wayback Machine (archived July 23, 2008)

The iPhone 3G is a 2008 smartphone developed and marketed by Apple. It is the second generation of iPhone, successor to the original iPhone, and was introduced on June 9, 2008, at WWDC 2008 which took place at the Moscone Center in San Francisco.

The iPhone 3G is internally similar to its predecessor, but included several new hardware features, such as GPS, 3G data, and tri-band UMTS/HSDPA. The device was originally loaded with the concurrently launched iPhone OS 2. In addition to other features (including push email and turn-by-turn navigation), this new operating system introduced the App Store—Apple's new distribution platform for third-party applications.

Commercially, the iPhone 3G was successful. Its sales numbers were significantly higher than the first generation iPhone and pushed the iPhone's commercial popularity above the company's Mac products. By the end of 2008, the iPhone 3G had become the best-selling cell phone domestically, overtaking the Motorola Razr V3, while Apple also overtook RIM to become the second-largest vendor of smartphones. Its succeeding third-generation iPhone, the iPhone 3GS, was released in June 2009.

== History ==
On July 11, 2008, Apple released the iPhone 3G across 22 countries. It was released in two storage options: 8 GB and 16 GB. The 16 GB model was produced in either black or white. Within the United States, it was only available with a two-year AT&T cell phone plan, and required an up-front payment of $199 for the 8 GB model and $299 for the 16 GB model.

Following the release of the successor iPhone 3GS model one year later, the iPhone 3G remained on sale but became Apple's budget phone offer, with its price reduced. This $99 iPhone 3G required a two-year contract and was available only in black and with 8 GB of storage, but came bundled with the then-new iPhone OS 3.0 firmware. Without a contract, the iPhone 3G was available no-commitment from AT&T for $499 (8 GB) or $549 (16 GB) in 2009. On June 7, 2010, the iPhone 3G was finally discontinued, and replaced as Apple's budget phone by an 8 GB iPhone 3GS selling for $99 with a 2-year contract. It is the second model to be neither released nor discontinued in September, unlike the iPhone 4 and later (excluding the iPhone 8 and iPhone 14).

In 2008, Import Genius, a provider of business intelligence for the import-export industry, used electronic customs clearance data, which is published by U.S. Customs and Border Protection pursuant to the Freedom of Information Act, to detect the arrival of the iPhone 3G prior to Apple's announcement.

== Software ==
The iPhone 3G came preloaded with the latest version of iOS and continued to receive updates to its software for over two years, with major iterations released on an annual basis. However, the phone had access to a decreasing proportion of new features with each update as its hardware became superseded by later models.

When it was launched, the iPhone 3G came preloaded with iPhone OS 2. This introduced the App Store, Microsoft Exchange ActiveSync support, Apple's MobileMe service, and push email support, along with other new features and bug fixes.

In June 2009, iPhone 3G users received the iPhone OS 3 software update, which introduced the long-awaited MMS feature, copy and paste, landscape support for more applications, Bluetooth stereo support, and other improvements.

In June 2010, Apple released the iOS 4.0 software update. Unlike its successor models, the iPhone 3G does not support prominent features of iOS 4.0 such as multitasking, the ability to set a home screen wallpaper, or Bluetooth keyboard support. However, it does provide access to a unified mailbox feature, home screen folders to better organize apps, playlist creation, and other enhancements. This update was widely criticized for slow performance on iPhone 3G, though September 2010's iOS 4.1 release resolved this problem. However, unlike more modern iOS devices, this update again does not provide iPhone 3G owners with access to important features, in this case, the Game Center application.

On November 22, 2010, the iPhone 3G received the iOS 4.2 software update (as iOS 4.2.1), which introduced features such as YouTube voting, and security fixes. However, the iPhone 3G is unable to use many features included in this update, such as AirPlay and Safari Text Search. This is the last iOS release to support this iPhone model; iOS 4.3 and later are not compatible with this iPhone model due to hardware limitations and performance issues.

Virtually all apps released after the release of iOS 6 in late September 2012 do not run on the iPhone 3G, as the software development kit (SDK) was changed to no longer allow the "targeting" (minimum) of iOS versions older than 4.3 (including 3.x and up to 4.2.1), or ARMv6 devices (first two generations).

== Hardware ==
=== Design ===
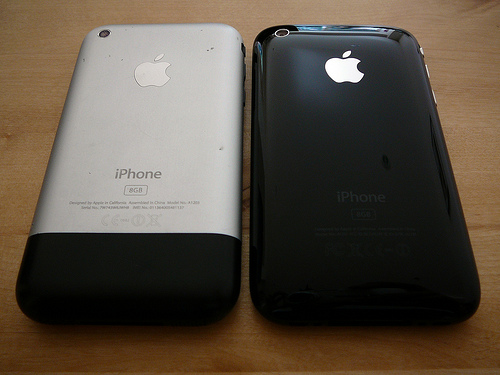
A rear view of the original iPhone (left) made of aluminum and plastic, and the iPhone 3G (right) made entirely from a hard plastic material

The iPhone 3G's back featured a redesigned plastic housing, replacing the aluminum back of the first generation. The housing is made of clear polycarbonate painted either black or white on the inside. Buttons were changed from plastic to metal, and the edges of the phone were tapered, providing a better grip. The iPhone 3G introduced the first official color options for the outer casing, with the 16 GB version available in black and white.

The dimensions of the iPhone 3G were marginally larger than those of the original iPhone. It was 116 millimetres (4.6 in) high, 62 millimetres (2.4 in) wide, and 12 millimetres (0.47 in) deep, compared to its predecessor, which was 110 millimetres (4.3 in) high, 61 millimetres (2.4 in) wide, and 12 millimetres (0.47 in) deep.

The iPhone 3G sported a 3.5 in (89 mm) capacitive touchscreen with a 480×320 (HVGA) resolution at 163 ppi. The scratch-resistant glass sits on top of the display. Just like the original iPhone, the touchscreen was designed for a bare finger, or multiple fingers for multi-touch sensing. The device featured the same sensors as its predecessor. The proximity sensor (which deactivates the display during calls when the face is near) was repositioned to save battery power and to prevent inadvertent inputs from the user's face and ears. An ambient light sensor was included to adjust the display brightness for different lighting conditions, which helps save battery power. A 3-axis accelerometer was included to sense the orientation of the phone and change the screen accordingly, allowing the user to easily switch between portrait and landscape mode.

=== Processor and memory ===
Most of the iPhone 3G's internal hardware is based on the original iPhone. It includes a Samsung 32-bit RISC ARM11 620 MHz processor (underclocked to 412 MHz), a PowerVR MBX Lite 3D GPU, and 128 MB of package on package (PoP) DRAM, as the original iPhone did.

=== Rear camera ===
On the rear of the device, the iPhone 3G features the same fixed-focus 2.0 megapixel camera of its predecessor. This camera does not have optical zoom, flash, autofocus, or native video recording, although various applications became available to allow video recording on the device. The iPhone 3G's operating system supports the geotagging of photographs.

=== Connectivity ===
In addition to EDGE, the iPhone 3G supports Assisted GPS, 3G data, and tri-band UMTS/HSDPA. These enhancements allow faster data downloads and turn-by-turn navigation with maps compared to previous devices.

Like its predecessor, the iPhone 3G features a proprietary 30-pin dock connector for charging the device. It can also be used to synchronize the device with a computer and to connect various accessories.

The iPhone 3G features a flush-mounted 3.5 mm headphone jack instead of the recessed headphone jack that was included on the original iPhone; it could, therefore, be used with any headphones other than those provided by Apple.

=== Battery ===
The iPhone 3G features an internal rechargeable battery rated at 1150 mAh, which, like its predecessor, is not user-replaceable. Apple stated that the iPhone 3G's battery is capable of providing up to six hours of web browsing via Wi-Fi, or five hours via 3G, or 25 hours of audio playback. Alternatively, it is said to provide 300 hours of standby time.

== Reception ==
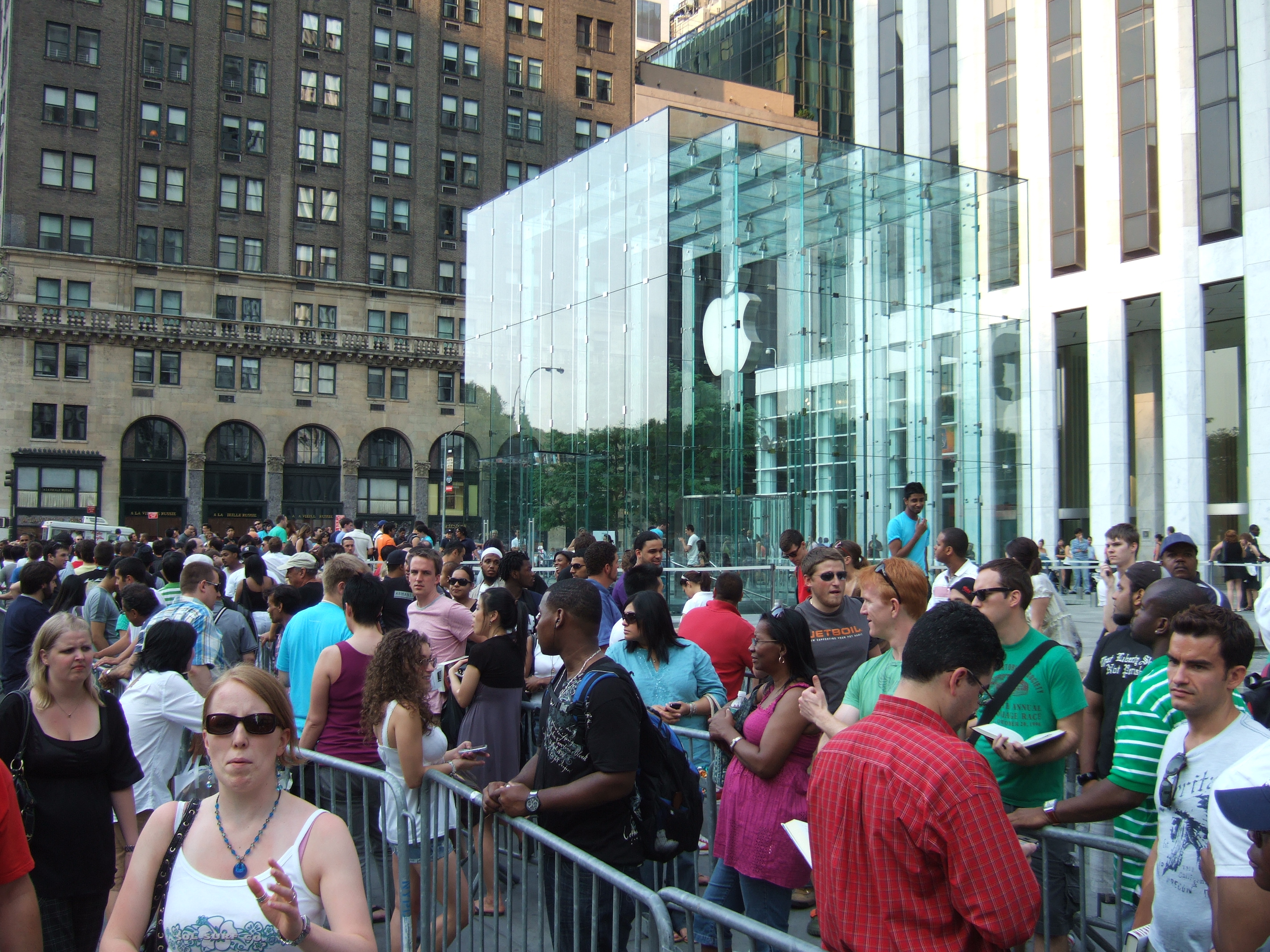
Line of people waiting for the iPhone 3G outside of the Apple Store in New York City, 2008

Walt Mossberg of The Wall Street Journal described the device as "a more capable version of an already excellent device." However, he said that it had "hidden costs."

Wired, an American magazine, also published a survey in 2008 after the release where users sent in mixed reviews especially from readers that had misunderstandings about the 3G connection causing negative reviews of the iPhone.

Digital media website CNET gave the 3G an 8.0/10, praising its call quality and music and video experience, but pointed out the lack of basic features, uneven battery life, and shaky 3G connection.

=== Issues ===
==== Dropped calls and slow web connections ====
Shortly after its release, the iPhone 3G faced criticism for frequent dropped calls and sluggish web browsing experiences. Investigations by various sources pointed towards a specific chip within the phone as the culprit for these connectivity problems.

Apple addressed these issues through a software update, avoiding the need for a more drastic measure like a product recall. This update presumably addressed the problematic chip's behavior, improving call quality and internet connection speeds for iPhone 3G users.

While user reports indicated connectivity issues, AT&T, the primary carrier for the iPhone 3G at the time, offered a contrasting perspective. In a statement, they said, "Overall, the new iPhone is performing just great on our 3G network."

==== Battery drain ====
iOS 4, which was still compatible with the iPhone 3G, was released on June 21, 2010. An article in the Wall Street Journal's Digits column on July 28, 2010, reported that iPhone 3G phones updating to iOS 4 responded slowly, had diminished battery life, and became excessively hot.

== See also ==
- List of iPhone models
- Timeline of iPhone models

| Preceded by iPhone (1st generation) | iPhone 3G; 2nd generation | Succeeded by iPhone 3GS |
