= IPod Touch (4th generation) =

Mobile device made by Apple Inc.

iPod Touch (4th generation)
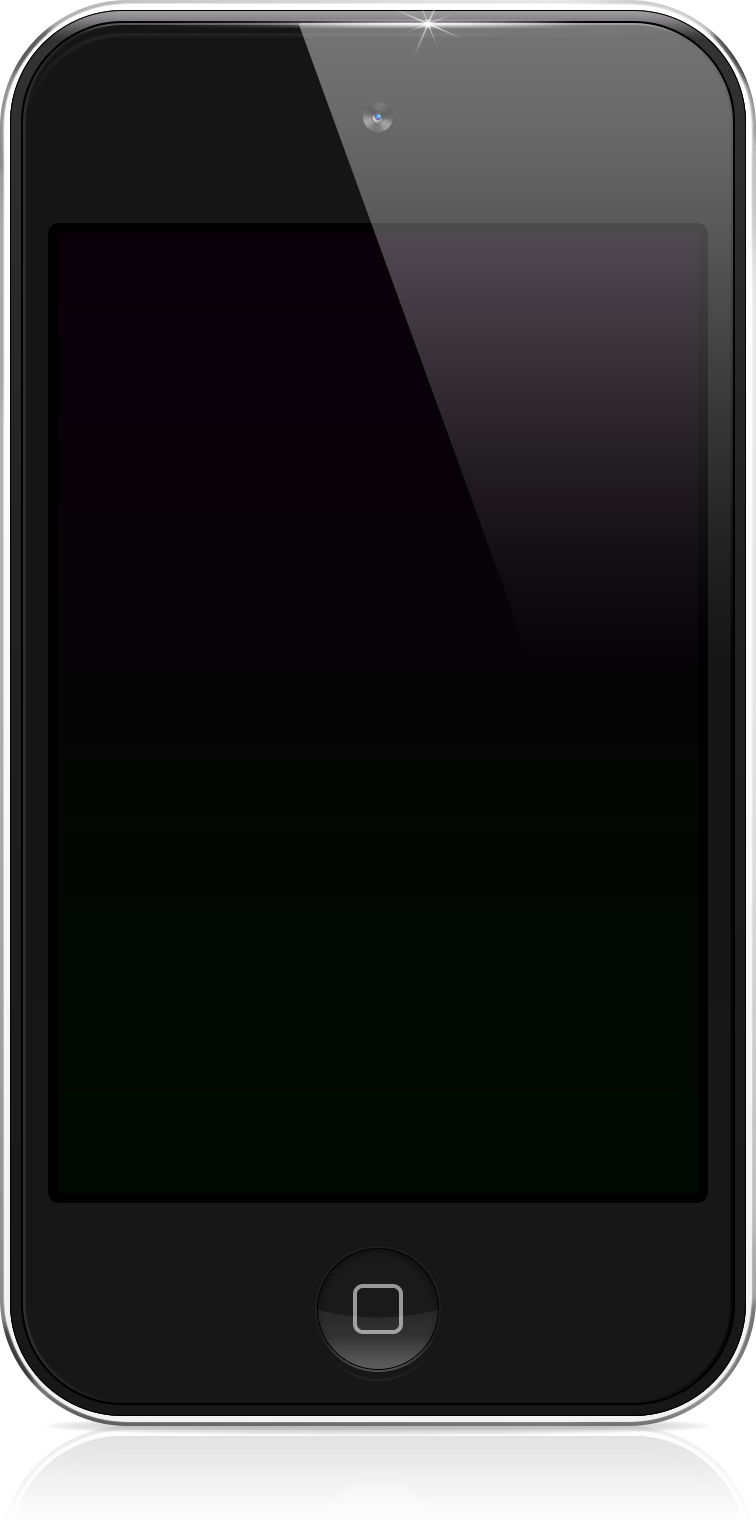
- A black iPod touch (4th generation)
- Developer: Apple Inc.
- Manufacturer: Foxconn
- Product family: iPod
- Type: Mobile device
- Released: September 12, 2010; 16 years ago (8, 32, and 64 GB); October 12, 2011; 15 years ago (White model); October 11, 2012; 14 years ago (16 GB)
- Lifespan: September 12, 2010 - May 30, 2013
- Discontinued: October 11, 2012; 14 years ago (8 and 64 GB); May 30, 2013; 13 years ago (16 and 32 GB)
- Operating system: Original: iOS 4.1 iOS 5.0 (White model); Last: iOS 6.1.6, released February 21, 2014 iOS 7.1.2 (unofficial)
- System on a chip: Apple A4
- CPU: ARM Cortex-A8 Apple A4 800 MHz
- Memory: 256 MB DRAM
- Storage: 8, 16, 32 or 64 GB flash memory
- Display: 3.5 in (89 mm) diagonal (3:2 aspect ratio), multi-touch display, LED backlit TN TFT LCD, 960×640 px at 326 PPI; 800:1 contrast ratio (typical), 500 cd/m^{2} max. brightness (typical), Fingerprint-resistant oleophobic coating on front
- Graphics: PowerVR SGX535 GPU
- Sound: Microphone; Built-in speaker
- Input: Multi-touch touchscreen display; Volume buttons; Voice control; 3-axis gyroscope; 3-axis Accelerometer; Ambient Light Sensor
- Camera: Rear: 0.7 MP back-side illuminated sensor HD video recording 720p up to 30 frames/s with audio Aperture f/2.4 Facial recognition (stills only); Front: FaceTime camera with 0.3 MP VGA up to 30 frames/s with audio
- Connectivity: Wi-Fi 802.11b/g/n (802.11n 2.4 GHz); Bluetooth 2.1 + EDR; 30-pin dock connector
- Online services: App Store, iTunes Store, iBookstore, iCloud, Passbook, MobileMe
- Dimensions: 110 mm (4.3 in) H 58 mm (2.3 in) W 7.1 mm (0.28 in) D
- Weight: 101 g (3.6 oz)
- Predecessor: iPod Touch (3rd generation)
- Successor: iPod Touch (5th generation)
- Related: iPhone 4
- Website: Apple - iPod touch - Video calls, HD video, Game Center, and more at the Wayback Machine (archived September 14, 2010)

The iPod Touch 4th generation (marketed as "the new iPod touch", and colloquially known as the iPod Touch 4G, iPod Touch 4, or iPod 4) is a multi-touch mobile device designed and marketed by Apple Inc. with a touchscreen-based user interface. The successor to the 3rd-generation iPod Touch, it was unveiled at Apple's media event on September 1, 2010, and was released on September 12, 2010. It is compatible with up to iOS 6.1.6, which was released on February 21, 2014.

The fourth-generation iPod Touch was the first iPod to offer front and rear facing cameras. It is a slimmer, lighter model than its predecessors and the iPhone 4, and introduces a Retina Display. Other improvements include support for recording 720p video via the rear camera, and Apple's A4 chip (the same chip used in the iPad (1st generation), and iPhone 4).

== History ==
The fourth-generation iPod Touch was initially released with a single color option. It initially featured with a black-colored front with a stainless steel back. On October 12, 2011, with the release of the iPhone 4S, the white-colored version was added and the stainless steel back remained unchanged. It was the last iPod Touch to have this customization option, because it was removed with the release of the fifth-generation iPod Touch, which removed the front color options in favor of changing the faceplate color depending on the back color of the device.

The device was initially only sold in 8 GB, 32 GB and 64 GB models. The three storage options remained the same in October 2011, with the release of the white-colored version. On October 11, 2012, Apple discontinued the 8 GB and 64 GB models with the release of the 32 and 64 GB models of the fifth-generation iPod Touch. The price for the 32 GB model was reduced, and the 16 GB model was introduced. The iPod Touch (4th generation) was officially discontinued by Apple on May 30, 2013, with the release of a 16 GB version of its successor, the iPod Touch 5. It is also the last of the iPod Touch players released to use the 30-pin dock connector, which was substituted with the Lightning connector starting with the 5th generation of iPod Touch devices.

== Features ==
=== Software ===
It fully supports iOS 4, and iOS 5, but has limited support for iOS 6. Unlike the iPhone 4, it did not officially support iOS 7 due to performance issues. On November 14, 2013, Apple issued iOS 6.1.5 for the iPod touch (4th generation) to fix FaceTime calls failing. On February 21, 2014, Apple issued iOS 6.1.6 for the iPod touch (4th generation) and iPhone 3GS to fix faulty SSL verification. It also was the last version for all those devices.

In 2018, iOS 7 was successfully ported to the device, adding unofficial iOS 7 support.
