= Game Center =

Apple online multiplayer social gaming network

- Type: Online service
- Launched: September 8, 2010; 16 years ago
- Current version: 27.0.1 (September 28, 2026; 5 days ago) [±]
- Platforms: iOS 4.1 or later, OS X 10.8 Mountain Lion or later
- Operating systems: macOS, iOS, iPadOS, tvOS, watchOS
- Members: 67 million (as of October 22, 2011)

Game Center is a service by Apple that allows users to play and challenge friends when playing online multiplayer social gaming network games. Games can share multiplayer functionality between the Mac and iOS versions of the app.

Game Center was introduced to the public in iOS 4.1 after an earlier developer release. Game Center can be implemented by developers as of iOS 4.1 or later, and macOS 10.12 or later, through the GameKit framework. Game Center is available on iPod Touch 2nd generation and later (iOS 4.1 or higher required); iPhone 3GS and later (iOS 4.1 or higher required); all models of the iPad (iOS 4.2 or higher required); Mac computers running macOS 10.12 Sierra or later, Apple TV 4 or later running tvOS, and Apple Watch running watchOS 3 or later.

The name “Game Center” retains its US-English spelling even when the operating system language is set to an English version where “Game Centre” is the correct form.

== Background ==
Gaming became a significant part of the iOS platform when Apple launched the App Store on July 10, 2008. Unlike the console systems that were currently on the market, Apple had no unified multiplayer and social structure for their platform. This gap was soon filled by third parties, such as OpenFeint, Plus, AGON Online, and Scoreloop. These third parties had control over the online gaming environment, and with multiple third parties involved, it left a non-unified experience.

== History ==
Game Center was announced during an iOS 4 preview event hosted by Apple on April 8, 2010. A preview was released to registered Apple developers in August The developer preview had a dark appearance with abstract colors.

Game Center was released to the public on September 8, 2010, with iOS 4.1 on iPhone 4, iPhone 3GS, and iPod Touch 2nd generation through 4th generation, and is included with iOS 4.2 or later on the iPad. With the release, the application had changed significantly in its design from its first developer preview: it had a lighter "game board" appearance with more skeuomorphic design elements. Though the iPhone 3G did not officially receive Game Center, it could be installed unofficially via jailbreaking.

The release of iOS 5 introduced turn-based gaming, player photos, friend suggestions, and achievement points. Challenges, a way for players to challenge other players to beat leaderboard scores or earn achievements, were later added with iOS 6.

On June 13, 2016, the standalone Game Center application was removed from iOS 10 and macOS Sierra, though the service was still available; management of user profiles was moved within the Settings app. The Game Center settings pane received a further redesign in iOS 14, iPadOS 14 and macOS Big Sur.

Two Game Center widgets were introduced in iOS 15, iPadOS 15 and macOS Monterey for accessing recently played games and viewing friend activity.

== Games app ==
Games
- Developer: Apple
- Release: September 15, 2025; 12 months ago
- Operating system: iOS 26 onward, iPadOS 26 onward, macOS Tahoe onward
- Type: Gaming hub
- Website: developer.apple.com/games-app

Games is a gaming hub application released alongside iOS 26, iPadOS 26, and macOS Tahoe. It allows players to view and access their library of games, including titles that have been previously downloaded to their Apple Account, as well as browse other available titles from the App Store and Apple Arcade.

It functions similarly to the former standalone Game Center application, allowing the users to view their achievements and leaderboard positions, start challenges, and manage their user profiles and friends requests.

== Features ==
The Game Center platform allows players to connect with friends, send friend requests and organize online multiplayer games. The number of friends that can be connected to a single Game Center account is limited to 500.

Many iOS games include Game Center integration through Apple's GameKit framework, but not all of them utilise every feature. Developers can choose to include any or all of the following features into their games:

- Achievements – badges are awarded to players for completing specific in game goals. Users can track how many achievements they have earned and view the percentage of players globally who have completed a specific goal.
- Challenges – users can invite their friends to compete against each other with custom rulesets, including the number of tries and challenge duration.
- Leaderboards – compares high scores with the player's friends and with other players from around the world.
- Multiplayer – the game can host matches in real-time, either between the player's friends or by "auto-matching" with random players from around the world.

== See also ==
- Google Play Games
- Xbox Live
- N-Gage
- Social network game – online games played through social networks
