= IOS 4 =

2010 mobile operating system

iOS 4
- Version of the iOS operating system

- iOS 4.1 home screen on an iPhone 3GS
- Developer: Apple Inc.
- Working state: No longer supported
- Source model: Closed, with open source components
- Initial release: June 21, 2010; 16 years ago
- Latest release: iPhone 3G, iPod Touch (2nd generation) 4.2.1 (November 22, 2010; 15 years ago) [±] iPhone 4 (CDMA) 4.2.10 (July 25, 2011; 15 years ago) [±] iPhone 3GS, iPhone 4 (GSM), iPod Touch (3rd generation), iPod Touch (4th generation), iPad (1st generation), iPad 2 4.3.5 (July 25, 2011; 15 years ago) [±]
- Update method: iTunes through a computer
- Package manager: App Store
- Supported platforms: iPhone, iPod Touch, iPad
- Kernel type: Hybrid (XNU)
- License: Proprietary EULA except for open-source components
- Preceded by: iPhone OS 3
- Succeeded by: iOS 5
- Official website: Apple – iPhone – New features in the iOS 4 Update at the Wayback Machine (archived June 30, 2010)

Support status
- Obsolete, unsupported

iOS 4 is the fourth major release of the iOS mobile operating system developed by Apple Inc., being the successor to iPhone OS 3. It was announced at the Apple Special Event on April 8, 2010, and released on June 21, 2010. iOS 4 was the first version branded as "iOS" rather than "iPhone OS", due to the release of the iPad and it being used by the iPod touch. It was succeeded by iOS 5 on October 12, 2011.

iOS 4 introduced many features that have since become commonplace, such as folders on the home screen, significantly increasing the number of apps that can be displayed. Support for home screen wallpapers on the iPhone was also added, although limited to newer devices due to animation performance requirements. The operating system also added a multitasking feature, letting apps dealing with Internet calling, location and audio playback function in the background, whereas a similar but more restricted "Fast App Switching" technology enabled any app to be left inactive in the background while users switch to other apps. iOS 4 also added a system-wide spell checking feature, enabled iBooks on iPhone, unified the Mail inbox to combine content from different email providers, and introduced both Game Center for social gaming and FaceTime for video calling.

The iOS 4 update introduced performance and battery problems on iPhone 3G devices, with Apple investigating the matter and promising then-upcoming updates. However, the company became the subject of a lawsuit from an unsatisfied customer over the issues. Around the same time, the release of iPhone 4 and its subsequent antenna problems (Antennagate) made Apple focus on unsuccessfully attempting to patch the issues with software updates.

iOS 4 is the final version of iOS that features the iPod app for music and videos on iPhones and iPads. Starting with iOS 5, iPhones and iPads do not have the iPod app; they have, instead, separate Music and Videos apps, matching what the iPod Touch has. It is also the last version of iOS that supports the iPhone 3G and second-generation iPod Touch, up to version 4.2.1 (4.3 dropped support for both devices), due to hardware limitations and performance issues.

== Apps ==
- iBooks
- Game Center
- FaceTime
- Photos

== History ==
iOS 4 was introduced at the Apple Special Event on April 8, 2010. At the WWDC keynote address on June 7, 2010, it was named iOS 4 and not iPhone OS 4 in order to be more inclusive to the iPod Touch and iPad.

iOS 4 was officially released on June 21, 2010.

== System features ==
=== Folders ===
iOS 4 added folders for apps, which raises the maximum number of home screen apps from 180 to 2,160. These folders would automatically be named based on the containing apps' respective App Store category, but can be given custom names if desired.

=== Multitasking ===
iOS 4 introduced multitasking, replacing the home button shortcuts feature which had a similar albeit more limited function. It allows users to switch between apps instantly by clicking the home button two times. It was implemented in such a way that did not cause excessive battery drain. Multitasking was limited to apps dealing with Internet calling, location, and audio playback, while a similar "Fast App Switching" technology meant users could leave an app and enter another, with the original app remaining in the background until the user returns. This feature was notably absent from iPhone 3G and the second-generation iPod Touch due to performance issues.

iOS 4 introduced a spell checking feature that underlined misspelled words in red. Tapping on the word would provide a pop-up with a recommended replacement.

=== Camera ===
The Camera app now supports 5x digital zoom.

=== Apps ===
The Mail app featured a unified inbox on iOS 4, allowing users to see messages from all of their email accounts displayed together in a single inbox. It also gained support for MobileMe e-mail aliases and multiple Exchange accounts for business users.

iOS 4.1 added a new app called Game Center, an online multiplayer social gaming network, which allows users to invite friends to play games and to compare their scores on a leaderboard. It was not available on the iPhone 3G.

=== FaceTime ===
iOS 4 introduced FaceTime, a videotelephony app that uses the device's camera to allow the user to make video calls with other FaceTime users. This feature was absent from the iPhone 3G, second-generation iPod Touch, iPhone 3GS, and third-generation iPod Touch due to the lack of required features, such as a front-facing camera.

=== Safari ===
The Safari mobile web browser on iOS 4 added Bing as a search option in addition to Google and Yahoo!. Beginning with iOS 4.2.1, specific words or phrases on a page could be searched.

=== Features added on the iPhone inherited from the iPad ===
On the iPhone, the ability to choose wallpapers and see them on the home screen was also added, and the iPad had its ones replaced to be consistent, though the feature was notably absent from iPhone 3G and the second-generation iPod Touch due to poor performance of icon animations.

The iPhone's dock was updated to be skeuomorphic, as with the Dock on the iPad and Mac OS X, and no longer has a grey line underneath it; the icons were redesigned to match.

iOS 4 introduced iPhone and iPod Touch support in iBooks, which was already included on the iPad. Though not a default app, it was available through the App Store.

== Problems ==
=== Performance and battery issues ===
iPhone 3G users reported performance and battery issues after upgrading to iOS 4. Apple started an investigation of the matter in July 2010. In November, Apple was sued for the issues, with an unsatisfied customer alleging "violating the Consumer Legal Remedies Act, unfair business practices, and false and deceptive advertising", with further allegations that Apple knew its software would cause problems on older models. Apple never responded to the allegations, but wrote in a reply to another unsatisfied customer in August 2010 that updates were "coming soon".

=== Alarm clock ===
In all versions of iOS 4, the alarm clock in the clock app had a problem in DST when it would go off an hour too early or too late.

=== Antenna problems ===
Upon its release, some iPhone 4 users reported having technical problems with the phone's antennas (Antennagate). Apple attempted to fix the issue in software with iOS 4.0.1, but failed to do so.

== Supported devices ==
iOS 4 drops support for the first-generation iPhone and first-generation iPod Touch. The first-generation iPod Touch did not receive support due to hardware limitations. This marks the first time Apple has dropped support for an iPhone while retaining support for another model featuring the same or a less powerful system on a chip. The iPhone 3GS and iPod Touch (3rd generation) has partial support, and the iPhone 3G and iPod Touch (2nd generation) have limited support. (Note: Multitasking, home screen wallpapers and Bluetooth keyboard support are not available on both the iPhone 3G and iPod Touch (2nd generation), while Game Center, Apple's gaming network, was available on the iPod Touch (2nd generation) but not on the iPhone 3G. FaceTime is not supported on iPhone 3G and 3GS, and the iPod Touch 2nd and 3rd generations.)

=== iPhone ===
- iPhone 3G
- iPhone 3GS
- iPhone 4

=== iPod Touch ===
- iPod Touch (2nd generation)
- iPod Touch (3rd generation)
- iPod Touch (4th generation)

=== iPad ===
- iPad (1st generation)
- iPad 2

=== Apple TV ===
- Apple TV (2nd generation)

== Version history ==
Version	Build	Codename	Release date	Notes
4.0	8A293	Apex	June 21, 2010	Initial release for iPhone 4 GSM: Allows use of multiple Mail inboxes; Adds support for folders for app organization; Allows creation of music playlists within the iPod app itself; Introduces the iBooks app; Adds tap-to-focus in the Camera app; Allows uses of Bluetooth keyboards; Allows users to gift apps to other Apple IDs in the App Store, as long as those apps contained no fraudulent information; The Calculator icon was changed.; App icons have been increased in resolution for the Retina Display of the iPhone 4.; Adds spellcheck; iPhone 3GS and iPhone 4 only: Adds support for multitasking; Adds support for setting a home screen wallpaper; iPhone 4 only: LED flash for camera; 5x digital camera zoom; FaceTime
4.0.1	8A306	Apex	July 15, 2010	Only for iPhone: Changes the algorithm that displays cellular signal strength after Antennagate; Fixes a bug with Microsoft Exchange accounts
4.0.2	8A400	Apex	August 11, 2010	Fixes a bug that allowed a maliciously crafted PDF to lead to arbitrary code execution; Fixes a bug that allows code running as user to gain system privileges; Due to all these patches, JailbreakMe 2.0 stops working.
4.1	8B117; 8B118 (Note: iPod Touch (4th generation) only)	Baker	September 8, 2010	Initial release on iPod Touch (4th generation): Adds HDR photo capture support to the iPhone 4; Allows upload of high definition videos captured on the iPhone 4 to YouTube and MobileMe; Fixes a bug that allowed a maliciously crafted .tiff image to lead to arbitrary code execution; Fixes a bug that allowed an attacker in a privileged network position to redirect FaceTime calls; Fixes multiple bugs that caused visiting a maliciously crafted website to lead to arbitrary code execution; Exclusive to iPhone 3GS, iPhone 4, and iPod touch (2nd and 3rd generation): Game Center, a service that allows syncing of game save data, achievements, and more. Game Center had previously been part of developer versions of iOS 4.
4.2	8C134	Unknown	November 1, 2010	Adds AirPlay, allowing devices to stream audio or video to the Apple TV (1st generation); Adds AirPrint, allowing devices to print wirelessly to some HP ePrint printers; Allows users to create a free MobileMe account to access Find My iPhone, which allows location tracking and remote locking or wiping of a device; Adds support for the iPad (1st generation); Birthdays calendar does not display birthdays starting more than 77 years ago.; Fixes glitch that can let a user get into the Phone app while the phone is locked via "Emergency Call" by dialing a random number and quickly pressing the lock button after dialing that call.; Improved iPhone 3G and iPod Touch (2nd generation) performance.; Import .ics calendar files directly for events.; Improved battery performance.; Birthdays icon has been changed in the Calendar app.; Text search on web pages. (iPhone 3GS and iPod touch 3 and 4 only); 2 new fonts for Notes in Settings (Helvetica and Chalkboard).; Added support for Chinese URL over Safari.: Added an indicator in the App Store which shows if an app supports Game Center.; Support for CoreMIDI.; YouTube voting.; Minor improvements in UI graphics.; New parental controls for deleting apps, changing mail accounts and location services.; The font size of text in Calendar can now be changed in the Accessibility settings.; Fixes Voice over IP (VoIP) issues. Find My iPhone location feature is free (iPhone 4, iPod Touch (4th generation), and iPad) running on iOS 4.2.1.: More than 30 new keyboards and dictionaries, including Arabic, Greek, and Hebrew.; New animation for Multitasking.; New bookmarks design (iPhone and iPod Touch only).: The Voice Memos icon was changed.; Ability to initiate FaceTime calls from Voice Control. (iPhone 4 only); FaceTime shortcut from Messages app (iPhone 4 only).: New text tone alerts (New and Original tone lists) (iPhone 4 only).; Ringer and alerts on/off switch (Settings > Sounds) for volume buttons (iPhone only).: Assign different text tone alerts to each contact.
4.2.1 (Note: No public release of iOS 4.2 is available, due to an issue that impacted Wi-Fi functionality on the iPad.)	8C148; 8C148a (Note: iPhone 3GS only)	Jasper	November 22, 2010	Last version of iOS to run on iPhone 3G and iPod Touch (2nd generation) due to hardware and performance issues.: Replaces iOS 4.2 as iOS 4.2 prevented Wi-Fi from working on the iPad (1st generation), iOS 4.2 was later pulled from public view
All devices except for iPhone 4 (CDMA), iPhone 3G, and iPod Touch (2nd generation)
4.3	8F190; 8F191 (Note: iPad 2 only)	Durango	March 4, 2011	Initial release on iPad 2: Adds personal hotspot to the iPhone 4 (GSM); Introduces iTunes home sharing; Improves AirPlay; Fixes multiple vulnerabilities in FreeType; Fixes multiple bugs that caused viewing maliciously crafted .tiff images to lead to arbitrary code execution; Fixes many, many bugs in WebKit that caused viewing a maliciously crafted website to lead to arbitrary code execution; Fixes a bug that allowed an attacker connected to the same network as an iPhone to be able to trigger a remote reset; The FaceTime icon on the iPod touch was changed.
4.3.1	8G4	Durango	March 25, 2011	Fixes iPod touch screen glitches; Fixes bugs that prevented activation and connection of iPhones; Fixes image flicker when using Apple Digital AV Adapter; Resolves an issue authenticating with some enterprise web services
4.3.2	8H7; 8H8 (Note: iPad 2 (CDMA) only)	Durango	April 14, 2011	Fixes a bug that caused FaceTime calls to freeze; Fixes connectivity issues on cellular-equipped iPads; Updates SSL certificates after fraudulent certificates were issued by a Comodo affiliate registration authority; Fixes multiple bugs that caused viewing of a maliciously crafted website to lead to arbitrary code execution
4.3.3	8J2; 8J3 (Note: iPad (1st generation) only)	Durango	May 4, 2011	Fixes a bug that caused location to be reported incorrectly
4.3.4	8K2	Durango	July 15, 2011	Fixes bugs that caused viewing a maliciously crafted PDF to cause arbitrary code execution; Fixes a bug that caused code running as user to gain system privileges; It also patches the latest version of JailbreakMe (JailbreakMe 3.0).
4.3.5	8L1	Durango	July 25, 2011	Fixes a bug that allowed an attacker in a privileged network position to capture and/or modify data in SSL/TLS-protected network sessions
iPhone 4 (CDMA) only
4.2.5	8E128	Unknown	January 11, 2011	Preview release on iPhone 4 (CDMA). Only available to the press, never shipped on release devices: Adds personal Wi-Fi hotspot support
4.2.6	8E200	Phoenix	January 31, 2011	Initial release on iPhone 4 (CDMA), as 4.2.5 was preloaded at the factory, 4.2.6 was the first public version.: Bug fixes for personal hotspots
4.2.7	8E303	Phoenix	April 14, 2011	Fixes a bug that caused FaceTime calls to freeze; Updates SSL certificates after fraudulent certificates were issued by a Comodo affiliate registration authority; Fixes multiple bugs that caused viewing of a maliciously crafted website to lead to arbitrary code execution
4.2.8	8E401	Phoenix	May 4, 2011	Fixes a bug that caused location to be reported incorrectly
4.2.9	8E501	Phoenix	July 15, 2011	Fixes bugs that caused viewing a maliciously crafted PDF to cause arbitrary code execution; Fixes a bug that caused code running as user to gain system privileges; It also patches the latest version of JailbreakMe (JailbreakMe 3.0).
4.2.10	8E600	Phoenix	July 25, 2011	Fixes a bug that allowed an attacker in a privileged network position to capture and/or modify data in SSL/TLS-protected network sessions

== Reception ==
iOS 4 had mostly positive reviews due to the new multitasking feature, the ability to organize apps into folders, the addition of FaceTime and Retina Display support. However, it was criticized for being extremely slow on older hardware, not having the multitasking feature on the iPhone 3G and 2nd-gen iPod Touch, and antenna issues.

Preceded by iPhone OS 3	iOS 4; 2010	Succeeded by iOS 5
