= IPad (1st generation) =

2010 Apple tablet computer

iPad
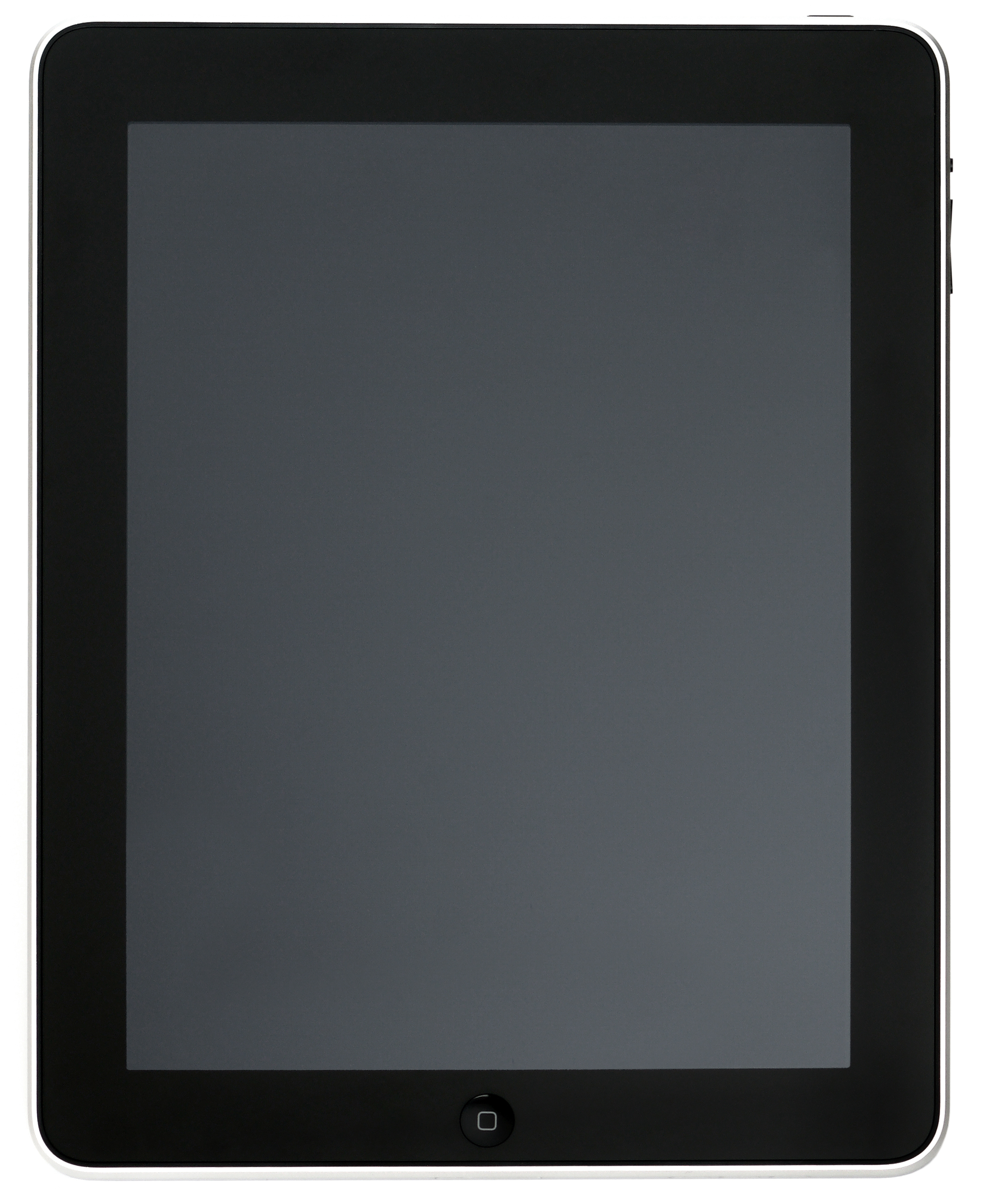
- Developer: Apple
- Manufacturer: Foxconn
- Product family: iPad
- Type: Tablet computer
- Generation: 1st
- Released: April 3, 2010: United States; April 23, 2010: Chile; Indonesia; Malaysia; Philippines; May 28, 2010: Spain; Italy; Switzerland; United Kingdom; Germany; Australia; Japan; Canada; France; Turkey; July 23, 2010: Austria; Belgium; Hong Kong; Ireland; Luxembourg; Mexico; Netherlands; New Zealand; Singapore; September 17, 2010: China; November 9, 2010 or November 8, 2010: Russia
- Lifespan: 2010–2011
- Introductory price: US$499
- Discontinued: March 2, 2011
- Units sold: 15 million
- Operating system: Original: iPhone OS 3.2; Last: iOS 5.1.1, released May 7, 2012 iOS 6.1.3 (unofficial) iOS 7.1.2 (unofficial)
- System on a chip: Apple A4
- CPU: 1 GHz ARM Cortex-A8
- Memory: 256 MB DDR RAM
- Storage: 16, 32 or 64 GB flash memory
- Display: 1024 × 768 px 132 PPI 4:3 aspect ratio 9.7 in (250 mm) diagonal XGA, LED-backlit IPS LCD
- Graphics: PowerVR SGX535
- Sound: Bluetooth, speaker, microphone, headset jack
- Input: Multi-touch screen, proximity and ambient light sensors, 3-axis accelerometer, digital compass
- Camera: Did not include any sort of camera until the iPad 2.
- Connectivity: Wi-Fi 802.11 a/b/g/n Bluetooth 2.1 + EDR 30-pin dock connector GSM models also include UMTS / HSDPA 850, 1,900, 2,100 MHz GSM / EDGE 850, 900, 1,800, 1,900 MHz)
- Power: Built-in rechargeable Li-Ion battery 3.75 V 24.8 W·A (6,600 mA·h, 10hr life
- Online services: iTunes Store, App Store, iCloud, iBookstore
- Dimensions: 9.56 in (243 mm) (h); 7.47 in (190 mm) (w); 0.50 in (13 mm) (d)
- Weight: Wi-Fi: 1.5 lb (680 g); Wi-Fi + 3G: 1.6 lb (730 g)
- Successor: iPad 2
- Related: iPhone, iPod Touch (comparison)
- Made in: China
- Website: iPad at the Wayback Machine (archived May 26, 2010)

The first-generation iPad (/ˈaɪpæd/; EYE-pad; retrospectively referred to unofficially as the iPad 1 or original iPad) is a tablet computer designed and marketed by Apple as the first device in the iPad lineup of tablet computers. It features an Apple A4 SoC, a 9.7 in (250 mm) touchscreen display, and, on certain variants, the capability of accessing cellular networks. Using the iOS operating system, the iPad can play music, send and receive emails and browse the web. Other functions, which include the ability to play games and access references, GPS navigation software and social network services, can be enabled by downloading apps.

The device was announced and unveiled on January 27, 2010 by Apple CEO Steve Jobs at an Apple press event. On April 3, 2010, the Wi-Fi variant of the device was released in the United States, followed by the release of the "Wi-Fi + 3G" variant on April 30. On May 28, 2010, it was released in Australia, Canada, France, Japan, Italy, Germany, Spain, Switzerland and the United Kingdom.

The device received positive reviews from various technology blogs and publications. Reviewers praised the device for its wide range of capabilities and labeled it as a competitor to laptops and netbooks. Some aspects were criticized, including the closed nature of the operating system and the lack of support for the Adobe Flash multimedia format. During the first 80 days, 3 million iPads were sold. By the launch of the iPad 2, Apple had sold more than 15 million iPads.

On March 2, 2011, the first-generation iPad was discontinued following Apple's announcement of the iPad 2. Remaining stock of the first iPad were temporarily available from Apple at reduced price.

== History ==
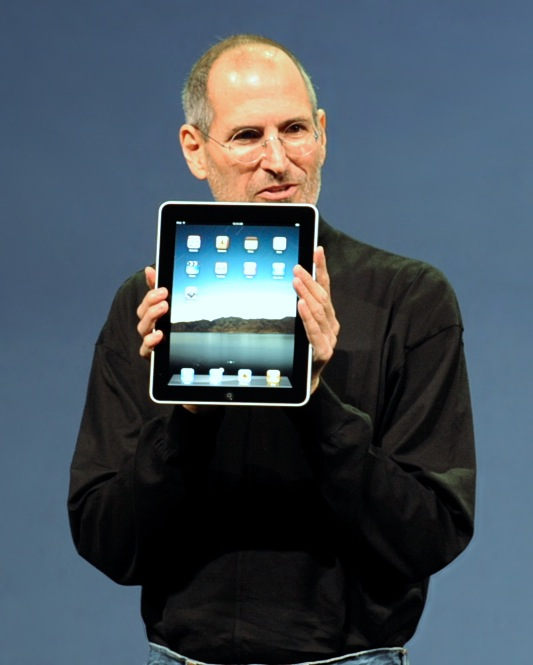
Former Apple chief executive officer Steve Jobs introducing the iPad at Apple's 2010 keynote address

Apple co-founder Steve Jobs stated in a 1983 speech about the company:

"[Our] strategy is really simple. What we want to do at Apple, is we want to put an incredibly great computer in a book that you can carry around with you and learn how to use in 20 minutes ... And we really want to do it with a radio link in it so you don't have to hook up to anything and you're in communication with all of these larger databases and other computers."

Apple's first tablet computer was the Newton MessagePad 100, introduced in 1993, which led to the creation of the ARM6 processor core with Acorn Computers. Apple also developed a prototype PowerBook Duo-based tablet, the PenLite, but decided not to sell it in order to avoid hurting MessagePad sales. Apple released several more Newton-based PDAs; the final one, the MessagePad 2100, was discontinued in 1998.

Apple reentered the mobile-computing market in 2007 with the iPhone. Smaller than the (not yet announced) iPad and featuring a camera and mobile capabilities, it pioneered the multitouch finger-sensitive touchscreen interface of Apple's iOS mobile operating system.

By late 2009, the iPad's release had been rumored for several years. Such speculation mostly talked about "Apple's tablet"; specific names included iTablet and iSlate. The actual name is reportedly an homage to the Star Trek PADD, a fictional device very similar in appearance to the iPad.

The iPad was announced on January 27, 2010, by Jobs at an Apple press conference at the Yerba Buena Center for the Arts in San Francisco.

Jobs later said that Apple began developing the iPad before the iPhone, but temporarily shelved the effort upon realizing that its ideas would work just as well in a mobile phone. The iPad's internal codename was K48, which was revealed in the court case surrounding leaking of iPad information before launch.

Apple began taking pre-orders for the iPad from US customers on March 12, 2010. The only major change to the device between its announcement and being available to pre-order was the change of the behavior of the side switch from sound muting to that of a screen rotation lock. The Wi-Fi version of the iPad went on sale in the United States on April 3, 2010. The Wi-Fi + 3G version was released on April 30. 3G service for the iPad in the United States is provided by AT&T and was initially sold with 2 prepaid contract-free data plan options: 1 for unlimited data and the other for 250 MB per month at 1/2 the price. On June 2, 2010, AT&T announced that, effective June 7, the unlimited plan would be replaced for new customers with a 2 GB plan at slightly lower cost; existing customers would have the option to keep the unlimited plan. The plans are activated on the iPad itself and can be cancelled at any time.

The iPad was initially only available for purchase on Apple's online store and its retail locations; it has since become available through retailers including Amazon, Walmart, and network operators. The iPad was launched in countries including Australia, Canada, France, Germany, Japan and the United Kingdom on May 28. Online pre-orders in those countries began on May 10. Apple released the iPad in Hong Kong, Ireland, Mexico, New Zealand and Singapore on July 23, 2010. Israel briefly prohibited importation of the iPad because of concerns that its Wi-Fi might interfere with other devices. On September 17, 2010, the iPad was officially launched in Mainland China.

== Features ==
=== Software ===
The iPad originally shipped with iPhone OS 3.2. On September 1, 2010, it was announced the iPad would get iOS 4.2 by November 2010; to fulfill this, Apple released iOS 4.2.1 to the public on November 22. (This update brought important features to the first-generation iPad, including multitasking capabilities and the introduction of app folders for better organization.) It comes with several applications, including Safari, Mail, Photos, Video, iPod, iTunes Store, App Store, Maps, Notes, Calendar, and Contacts. Several are improved versions of applications developed for the iPhone or Mac.

The iPad syncs with iTunes on a Mac or Windows PC. Apple ported its iWork suite from the Mac to the iPad, and sells pared-down versions of Pages, Numbers, and Keynote apps in the App Store. Although the iPad isn't designed to replace a mobile phone, a user can use a wired headset or the built-in speaker and microphone to place phone calls over Wi-Fi or 3G using a VoIP application.

On October 12, 2011, iOS 5 was released to various iOS devices, including the first-generation iPad, and was downloadable through iTunes. The update was reported to contain hundreds of new features and tweaks, including Twitter integration, the Notification Center and iMessage, which is a feature that allows users to send messages or multimedia files to other users on iOS or OS X, the operating system for Apple computers. iCloud, an iOS app and Apple-provided internet storage service which allows users to sync and backup their user data and settings to/from other devices, was also made available through this update.

On June 11, 2012, Apple announced the iOS 6 update – which brought several new features, like:

- A redesigned Maps app (replacing Google Maps with Apple's own)
- Passbook (later known as Wallet)
- Facebook integration
- FaceTime over cellular
- A full-screen Safari experience
- The Clock app for iPad (new for iPads in iOS 6)
- Enhanced Siri functionality

However, the first-generation iPad did not officially receive this update due to hardware limitations, making iOS 5.1.1 the last update available for the device.

In 2026, a developer on GitHub unofficially ported iOS 6 to the iPad. Shortly after, another developer on GitHub unofficially ported iOS 7 to the iPad.

=== Hardware ===
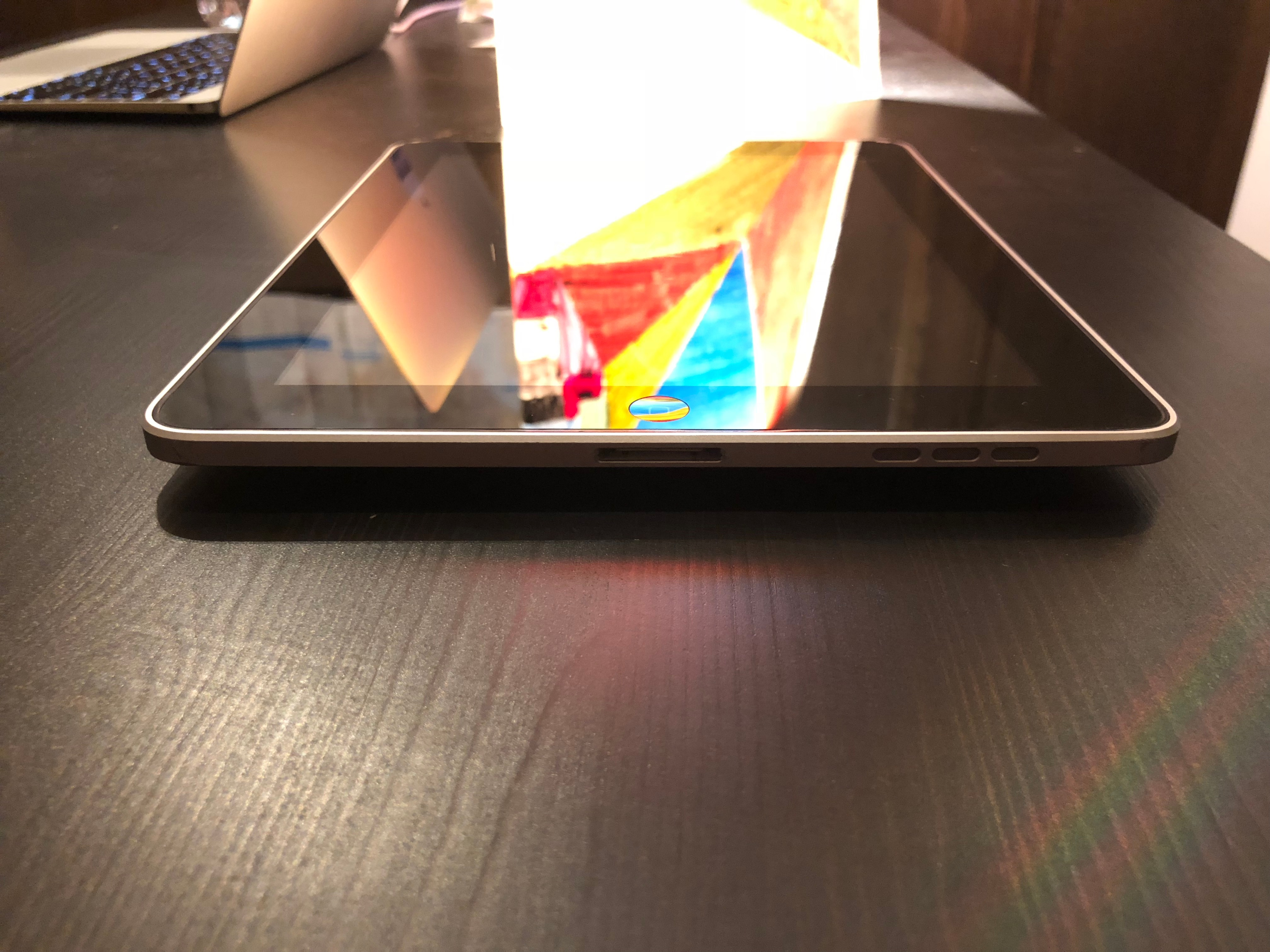
The lower portion of the iPad, showing the charging port and audio output grilles

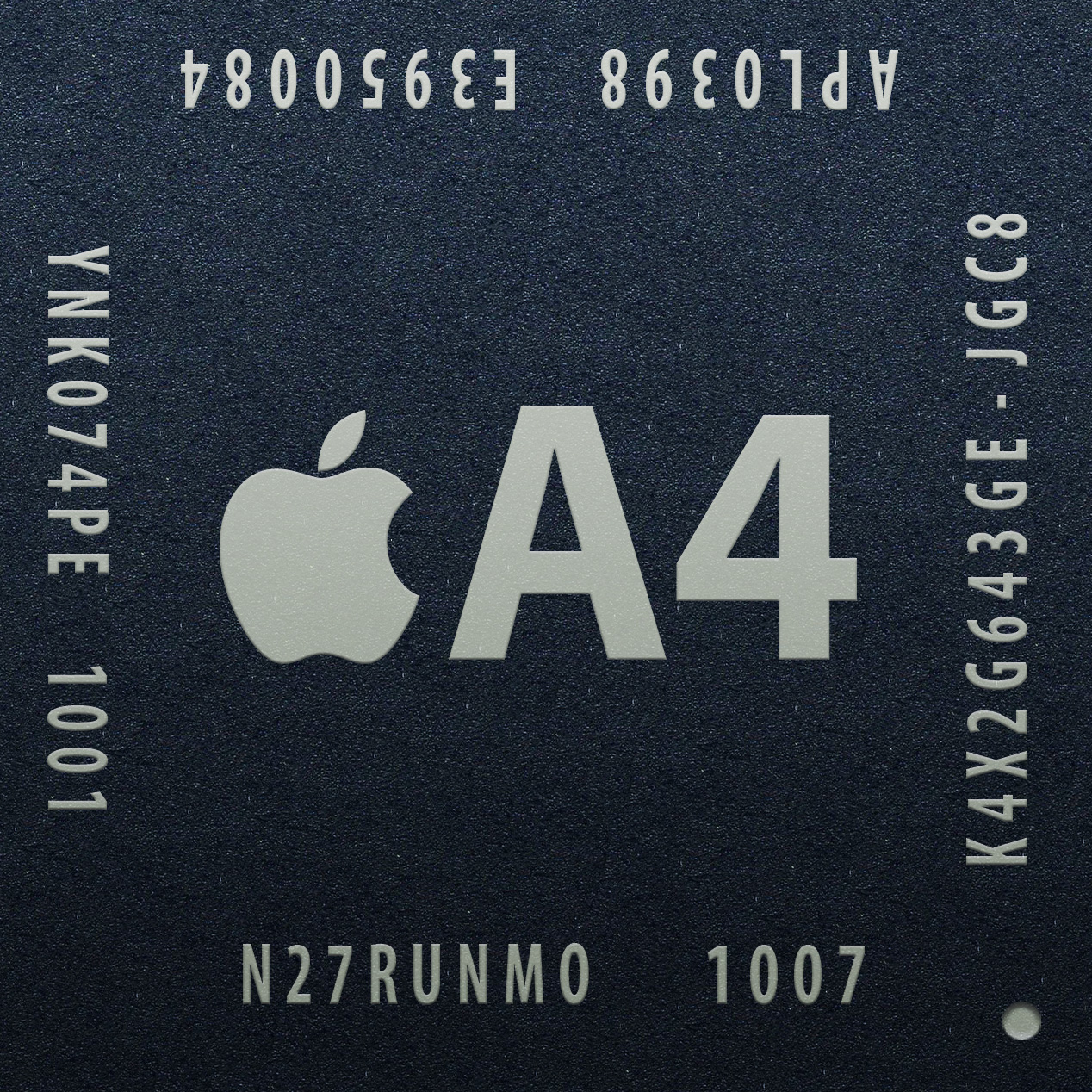
The Apple A4 chip, used in the first-generation iPad and the iPhone 4

The first-generation iPad features an Apple A4 SoC, which comprises a 1 GHz processor, 256 MB of RAM and a PowerVR SGX535 GPU. There are four physical switches on the iPad, including a home button near the display that returns the user to the main menu, and three plastic physical switches on the sides: wake/sleep and volume up/down, plus a software-controlled switch whose function has changed with software updates. Originally the switch locked the screen to its current orientation, but iOS 4.2 changed it to a mute switch, moving the rotation lock function to an onscreen menu. In the iOS 4.3 update, a setting was added to allow the user to specify whether the side switch was used for rotation lock or mute. Unlike its successors, the first-generation iPad has no cameras.

The iPad's touchscreen display is a 1,024 by 768 pixel, 7.75 × 5.82 in (197 × 148 mm) liquid crystal display (diagonal 9.7 in (246.4 mm)), with fingerprint- and scratch-resistant glass. As a result of the device's screen dimensions and resolution, the screen has a pixel density of 132 ppi. The display responds to other sensors: an ambient light sensor to adjust screen brightness and a 3-axis accelerometer to sense the iPad's orientation and switch between portrait and landscape modes. Unlike the iPhone and iPod Touch's built-in applications, which work in 3 orientations (portrait, landscape-left and landscape-right), the iPad's built-in applications support screen rotation in all four orientations, including upside-down. Consequently, the device has no intrinsic "native" orientation; only the relative position of the home button changes.

The iPad was equipped with 16 GB, 32 GB, or 64 GB (1 GB = 1 billion bytes) of solid-state (flash) storage for program and data storage. Furthermore, the device was available with two connectivity options: Wi-Fi only or Wi-Fi and 3G. Unlike its successors, the Wi-Fi + 3G variant of the first-generation iPad could only support carriers that utilized GSM/UMTS standards and was not compatible with CDMA networks; however, like its successors, assisted GPS services are supported. Bluetooth was also available on all models.

The weight of the first-generation iPad varied, dependent upon the connectivity options chosen. The Wi-Fi only variant weighs 1.5 lb (680 g) whereas the variant with Wi-Fi + 3G weighs 1.6 lb (730 g). Its dimensions, however, are identical across the entire range of variants, measuring 9.56×7.47×0.5 in (243×190×13 mm).

=== Accessories ===
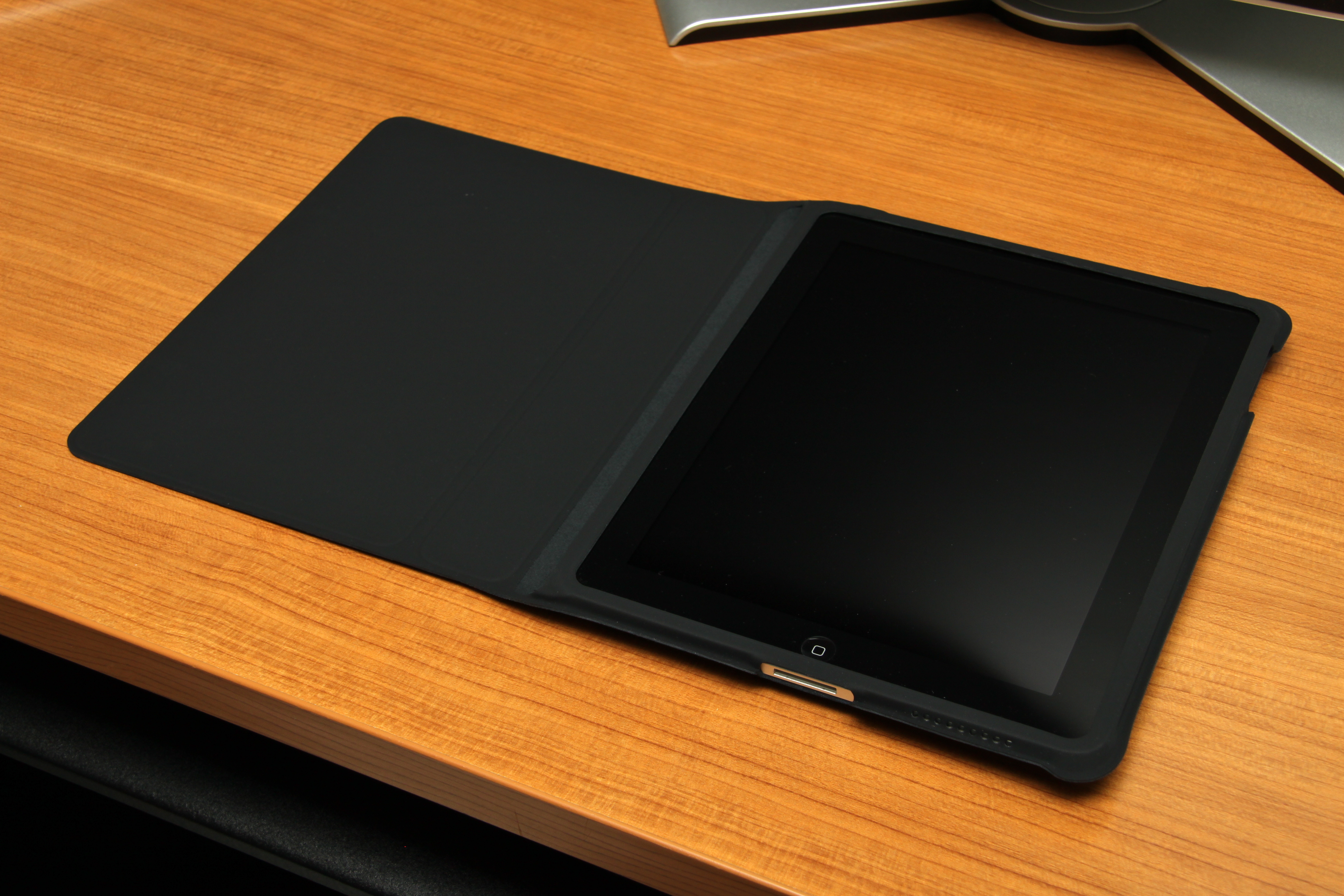
The original iPad in its black case

Apple offers several iPad accessories, most of which are adapters for the proprietary 30-pin dock connector, the iPad's only port besides the headphone jack. A dock holds the iPad upright at an angle, and has a dock connector and audio line-out port. Each generation of iPad requires a corresponding dock. A dock that included a physical keyboard was only supported for the original iPad, but all generations are compatible with Bluetooth keyboards that also work with Macs and PCs. The iPad can be charged with a 10 W standalone power adapter, which is also compatible with iPods and iPhones.

== Reception ==
=== Critical reception ===
Media reaction to the announcement of the device and the device itself was mixed. The media noted that thousands of people queued on the first day of sale in a number of countries with many of those who waited claiming that "it was worth it."

Walt Mossberg (of The Wall Street Journal) wrote, "It's about the software, stupid", meaning hardware features and build are less important to the iPad's success than software and user interface, his first impressions of which were largely positive. Mossberg also called the price "modest" for a device of its capabilities, and praised the ten-hour battery life. Others, including PC Advisor and the Sydney Morning Herald, wrote that the iPad would also compete with proliferating netbooks, most of which use Microsoft Windows. The base model's price of US$499 (equivalent to $737 in 2025) was lower than pre-release estimates by Wall Street analysts, and Apple's competitors, all of whom were expecting a much higher entry price point.

The media also praised the quantity of applications, as well as the bookstore and other media applications. In contrast, some sources, including the BBC, criticized the iPad for being a closed system and mentioned that the iPad faces competition from Android-based tablets. However, at the time of the first-generation iPad's launch, Yahoo! News noted that the Android tablet OS, known as "Honeycomb", was not open source and has fewer apps available for it than for the iPad; although later Google released the source code for Honeycomb. The Independent criticized the iPad for not being as readable in bright light as paper but praised it for being able to store large quantities of books. After its UK release, The Daily Telegraph said the iPad's lack of Adobe Flash support was "annoying".

The iPad was selected by Time magazine as one of the 50 Best Inventions of the Year 2010, while Popular Science chose it as the top gadget behind the overall "Best of What's New 2010" winner Groasis Waterboxx.

=== Commercial reception ===
300,000 iPads were sold on their first day of availability. By May 3, 2010, Apple had sold a million iPads; this was just half the time it took Apple to sell the same number of original iPhones. After passing the one million mark, they continued selling rapidly, reaching 3 million sales after 80 days. During the financial conference call on October 18, 2010, Steve Jobs announced that Apple had sold more iPads than Macs for the fiscal quarter. In total, Apple sold more than 15 million first-generation iPads prior to the launch of the iPad 2 – more than all other tablet PCs combined since the iPad's release, and reaching 75% of tablet PC sales at the end of 2010.

=== Criticism ===
CNET criticized the iPad for its apparent lack of wireless sync, which other portable devices such as Microsoft's Zune have had for a number of years.

Walt Mossberg called it a "pretty close" laptop killer. David Pogue of The New York Times wrote a "dual" review, one part for technology-minded people, and the other part for non-technology-minded people. In the former section, he notes that a laptop offers more features for a cheaper price than the iPad. In his review for the latter audience, however, he claims that if his readers like the concept of the device and can understand what its intended uses are, then they will enjoy using the device. PC Magazine's Tim Gideon wrote, "you have yourself a winner" that "will undoubtedly be a driving force in shaping the emerging tablet landscape." Michael Arrington of TechCrunch said, "the iPad beats even my most optimistic expectations. This is a new category of device. But it also will replace laptops for many people." PC World criticized the iPad's file sharing and printing abilities, and ArsTechnica critically noted that sharing files with a computer is "one of our least favorite parts of the iPad experience."

The lack of Adobe Flash support was criticized with The Daily Telegraph saying that the iPad's lack of Adobe Flash support was "annoying."

== See also ==
- List of iPad accessories
- E-book reader
- Comparison of tablet computers

Preceded by –	iPad (1st generation); 2010	Succeeded by iPad 2
