= IPad Mini (1st generation) =

2012 tablet computer by Apple

iPad Mini

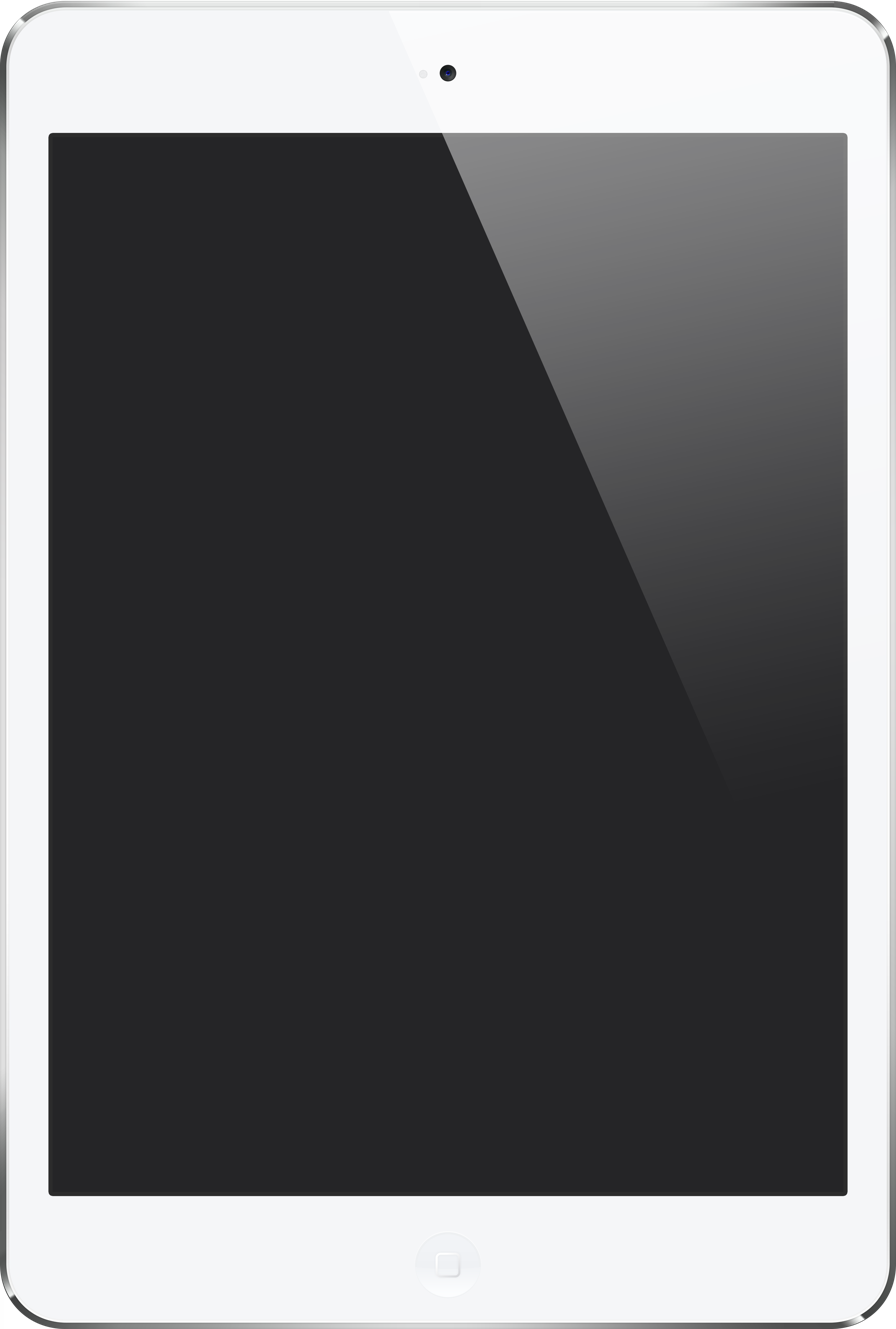
- iPad Mini in Silver
- Developer: Apple Inc.
- Manufacturer: Foxconn, Pegatron
- Product family: iPad Mini
- Type: Tablet computer
- Generation: 1st
- Released: November 2, 2012
- Discontinued: 32 & 64 GB: October 22, 2013; 16 GB: June 19, 2015
- Operating system: Original: iOS 6.0; Last: iOS 9.3.6, released July 22, 2019 (cellular models only), otherwise iOS 9.3.5 (released August 25, 2016)
- System on a chip: Apple A5 2nd Generation (32 nm)
- CPU: 1 GHz dual-core, dual-thread ARM Cortex-A9
- Memory: 512 MB DDR2 RAM
- Storage: 16, 32, 64 GB flash memory
- Display: 7.9-inch (200 mm) diagonal LED-backlit Multi-Touch display with IPS technology 1024 x 768 px at 163 PPI 4:3 aspect ratio
- Graphics: PowerVR SGX543MP2
- Input: Multi-touch screen, headset controls, proximity and ambient light sensors, 3-axis accelerometer, gyroscope, digital compass
- Camera: Front-facing 1.2 MP and rear-facing 5 MP
- Connectivity: All models Wi-Fi 802.11 a/b/g/n @ 2.4 GHz and 5 GHz Bluetooth 4.0 GSM LTE 700 / 2,100 (Band 4) MHz UMTS / HSPA+ / DC-HSDPA 850 / 900 / 1,900 / 2,100 MHz GSM / EDGE 850 / 900 / 1,800 / 1,900 MHz CDMA LTE 750 / 850 / 1,800 / 1,900 / 2,100 (Band 1) MHz CDMA / EV-DO Rev. A & B 800 / 1,900 / 2,100 MHz UMTS / HSPA+ / DC-HSDPA 850 / 900 / 1,900 / 2,100 MHz GSM / EDGE 850 / 900 / 1,800 / 1,900 MHz
- Power: Built-in rechargeable Li-Po battery 3.72 V 16.5 W·h (4,440 mA·h), 10hr life
- Online services: iTunes Store, App Store, iBookstore, Game Center, iCloud
- Dimensions: 200 mm × 134.7 mm × 7.2 mm (7.87 in × 5.30 in × 0.28 in)
- Weight: Wi-Fi: 308 g (0.679 lb); Wi-Fi + Cellular: 312 g (0.688 lb)
- Successor: iPad Mini 2
- Website: Apple – iPad mini at the Wayback Machine (archived November 5, 2012)

The iPad Mini (stylized as iPad mini), known retrospectively as the iPad Mini 1, is the first generation of the mini tablet computer developed and marketed by Apple Inc. It was announced on October 23, 2012, as the fourth major product in the iPad line and the first of the iPad Mini line. It features a reduced screen size of 7.9 inches (20 cm), compared to the 9.7-inch (25 cm) display on standard iPads at that time.

The first generation iPad Mini was succeeded by the iPad Mini 2.

== History ==
Before its official unveiling, the iPad Mini was the subject of months of speculation about its development and launch, with several photos of the possible product circulating online. Since 2010, reports and discussions suggested that Apple was working on a smaller tablet. Steve Jobs himself initially dismissed the idea of a 7-inch iPad and a larger-screen iPhone, though both concepts were later realized with the introduction of the iPhone 5 and the iPad Mini.

On October 16, 2012, Apple announced a media event for October 23 at the California Theatre in San Jose, California. The company did not predisclose the subject of the event, but it was widely expected to be the iPad Mini. On the day of the event, Apple CEO Tim Cook introduced a new version of MacBook family and new generations of the MacBook Pro, Mac Mini, and the iMac before the iPad Mini and the higher end fourth-generation iPad.

The iPad mini was released on November 2, 2012. The US list price started at $329 for the 16 GB model; the UK list price was £269 for the 16 GB model, £349 for the 32 GB model and £429 for the 64 GB model. Similar releases were made in nearly all of Apple's markets. The 32 GB and 64 GB models were discontinued with the release of its successor, the iPad Mini 2 and the iPad Air 1 on October 22, 2013. After almost 3 years on June 19, 2015, the remaining 16 GB model was discontinued as well. It was discontinued from stores, and from Apple's software updates and support.

== Features ==
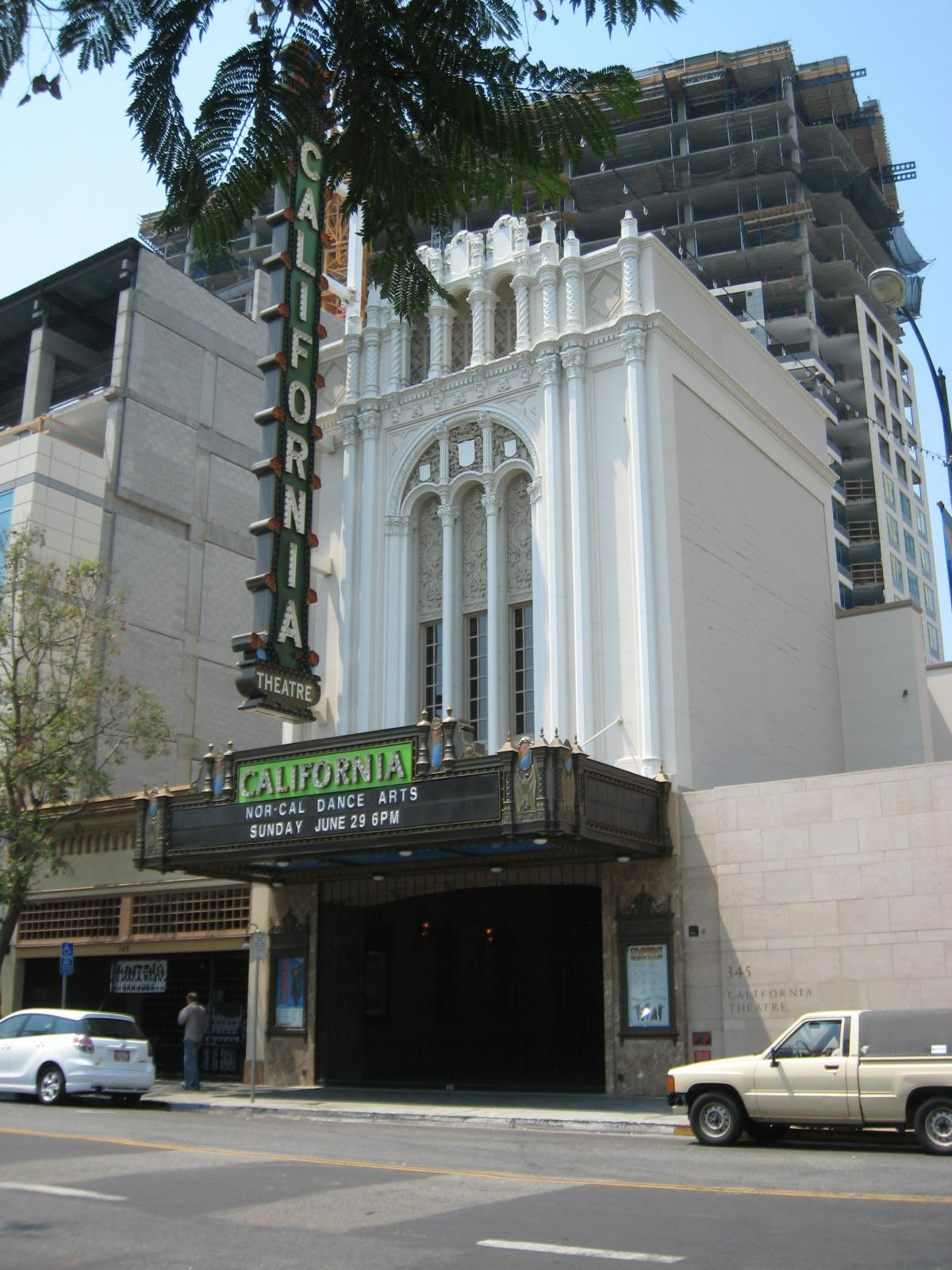
The California Theatre hosted the iPad Mini announcement on October 23, 2012.

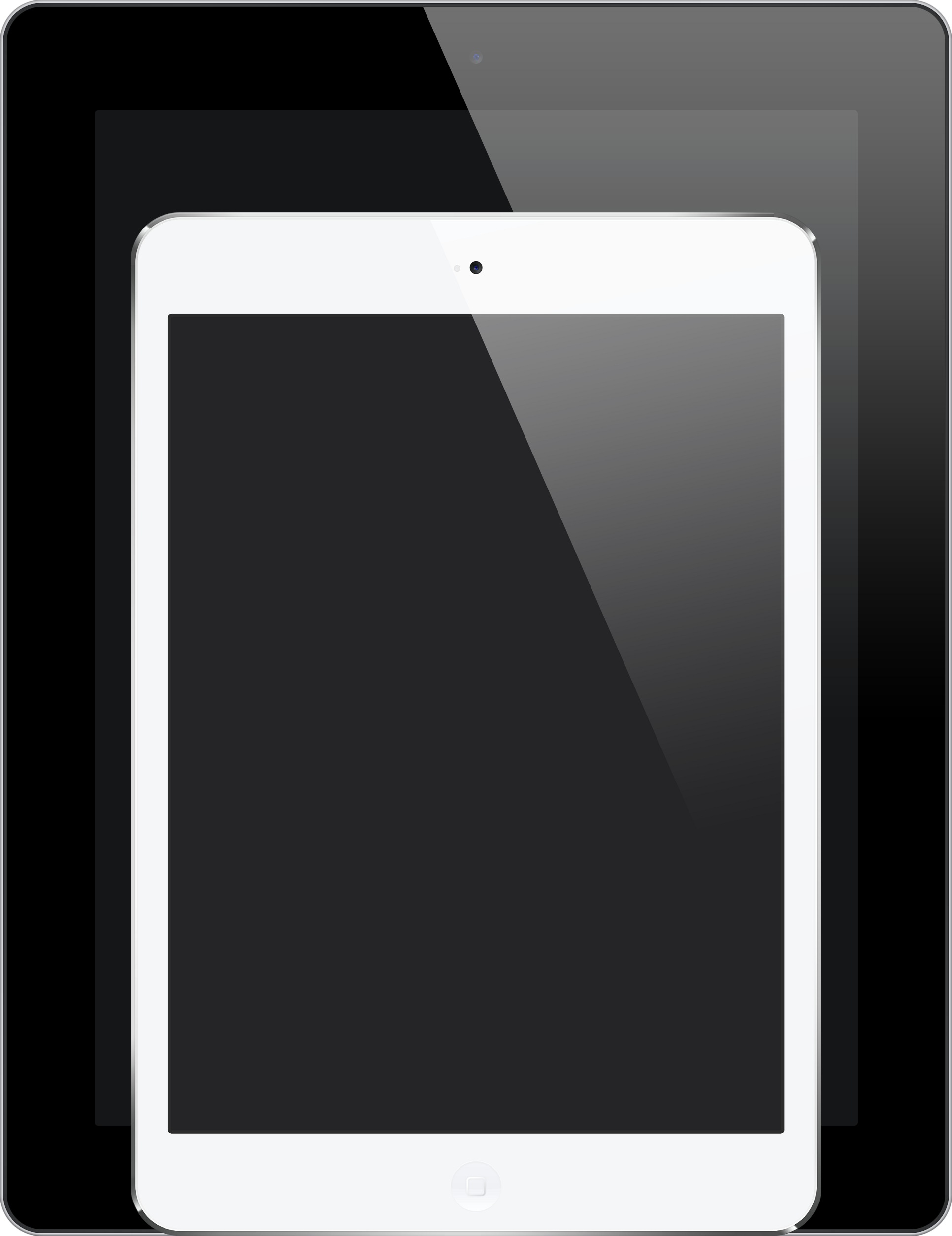
Size comparison between iPad Mini and iPad 3rd and 4th generations

=== Software ===
The iPad Mini was shipped with IOS 6.0 It can act as a hotspot with some carriers, sharing its Internet connection over Wi-Fi, Bluetooth, or USB, and also access the App Store, a digital application distribution platform for iOS that is developed and maintained by Apple. The service allows users to browse and download applications from the iTunes Store that were developed with Xcode and the iOS SDK and were published through Apple. From the App Store, GarageBand, iMovie, iPhoto, and the iWork apps (Pages, Keynote, and Numbers) are available. Currently the latest versions are IOS 9.3.6 (for Wi-Fi+Cellular models) and iOS 9.3.5 (for Wi-Fi-only models)

The iPad Mini comes with several pre-installed applications, including Siri, Safari, Mail, Photos, Video, Music, iTunes, App Store, Maps, Notes, Calendar, Game Center, Photo Booth, and Contacts. Like all iOS devices, the iPad can sync content and other data with a Mac or PC using iTunes, although iOS 5 and later can be managed and backed up with iCloud. Although the tablet is not designed to make telephone calls over a cellular network, users can use a headset or the built-in speaker and microphone and place phone calls over Wi-Fi or cellular using a VoIP application, such as Skype. The device has dictation, using the same voice recognition technology as the iPhone 4S. The user speaks and the iPad types what they say on the screen provided that the iPad is connected to a Wi-Fi or cellular network.

The device has an optional iBooks application, which displays books and other ePub-format content downloaded from the iBookstore. Several major book publishers including Penguin Books, HarperCollins, Simon & Schuster and Macmillan have committed to publishing books for the device. Despite being a direct competitor to both the Amazon Kindle and Barnes & Noble Nook, both Amazon.com and Barnes & Noble offer e-reader apps for the iPad.

On September 17, 2014, iOS 8 was released to the first-generation iPad Mini and all Apple Devices. However, some newer software features are not supported due to the relatively aged hardware shared with the iPad 2 and iPhone 4S.

On September 16, 2015, Apple rolled out iOS 9 to the iPad Mini 1, but it does not have the new split-screen multitasking feature present in the other iPads due to hardware limitations of the A5 chip with 512 MB RAM. That feature let iPads run two apps side by side (iPad Air 2 and later, iPad mini 4 and later, all iPad Pros, and iPad (5th generation) and later). Additionally, the iPad mini (1st generation) does not support Slide Over (temporary app overlay — available on the iPad Air and later, iPad mini 2 and later, all iPad Pros, and iPad (5th generation) and later) or Picture in Picture (floating video — available on the iPad Air and later, iPad mini 2 and later, all iPad Pros, and iPad (5th generation) and later).

On June 13, 2016, Apple announced the iOS 10 update – with some major updates to the mobile operating system. However, the iPad Mini did not receive this update (along with other devices using the A5 processor including the iPhone 4S, iPad 2, iPad (3rd generation), and iPod Touch (5th generation)) due to hardware limitations.

The industry expected Apple to discontinue iOS updates for the iPad Mini, but it has led to some criticism, as the device was sold until June 2015 and support was discontinued beyond iOS 9 by June 2016.

=== Hardware ===
Four buttons and one switch are on the iPad Mini, including a "home" button near the display that returns the user to the home screen, and three aluminum buttons on the right side and top: wake/sleep and volume up and volume down, plus a software-controlled switch whose function varies with software updates. The tablet is manufactured either with or without the capability to communicate over a cellular network. All models can connect to a wireless LAN via Wi-Fi. The iPad Mini is available with 16, 32, 64 GB of internal flash memory, with no expansion option. Apple sells a "camera connection kit" with an SD card reader, but it can only be used to transfer photos and videos.

The iPad Mini features partially the same hardware as the iPad 2. Both screens have resolutions of 1024 x 768, but the iPad Mini has a smaller screen and thus higher pixel density than iPad 2 (163 PPI vs 132 PPI). Unlike the iPad 2, it has 5 MP and 1.2 MP cameras and the Lightning connector. The system-on-chip is A5, which is the same one found in the later revision of the iPad 2 (32 nm). The audio processor is the same found in iPhone 5 and iPad 4th generation, which allows the iPad Mini to have Siri and voice dictation unlike the iPad 2. The graphics processor (GPU) of the iPad Mini is the same one found in the iPad 2 (PowerVR SGX543MP2). The iPad Mini was initially featured with slate and silver colors, however on the release of the Mini 2 the slate color was changed to space gray; the silver color remained.

=== Accessories ===
Apple Lightning connector

The Smart Cover, introduced with the iPad 2, is a screen protector that magnetically attaches to the face of the iPad. A smaller version was available for the iPad Mini, but later models including the iPad Mini 4 also use their own Smart Cover. The cover has three folds, which allow it to convert into a stand, held together by magnets. Smart Covers have a microfiber bottom that cleans the front of the iPad, and wakes up the unit when the cover is removed. It comes in six colors of polyurethane.

Apple offers other accessories, including a Bluetooth keyboard, several types of earbuds or headphones and many adapters for the Lightning connector. AppleCare and free engraving are also available for the iPad Mini.

== Reception ==
Reviews of the first generation iPad Mini have been positive, with reviewers praising the device's size, design, and availability of applications. However, reviewers criticized its use of a proprietary Lightning connector, lack of expandable storage, underpowered Apple A5 chip with 512 MB of RAM, and the lack of a Retina display. The device competes with tablets such as the Amazon Kindle Fire HD, Google Nexus 7, and Barnes & Noble Nook HD. Joshua Topolsky of The Verge praised the industrial design of the iPad Mini, however panned its lack of Retina display and price.

== See also ==
- Comparison of tablet computers
- List of iPad models

Preceded by N/A	iPad Mini (1st generation); 2012	Succeeded by iPad Mini 2
