= IOS 6 =

2012 mobile operating system

iOS 6
- Version of the iOS operating system
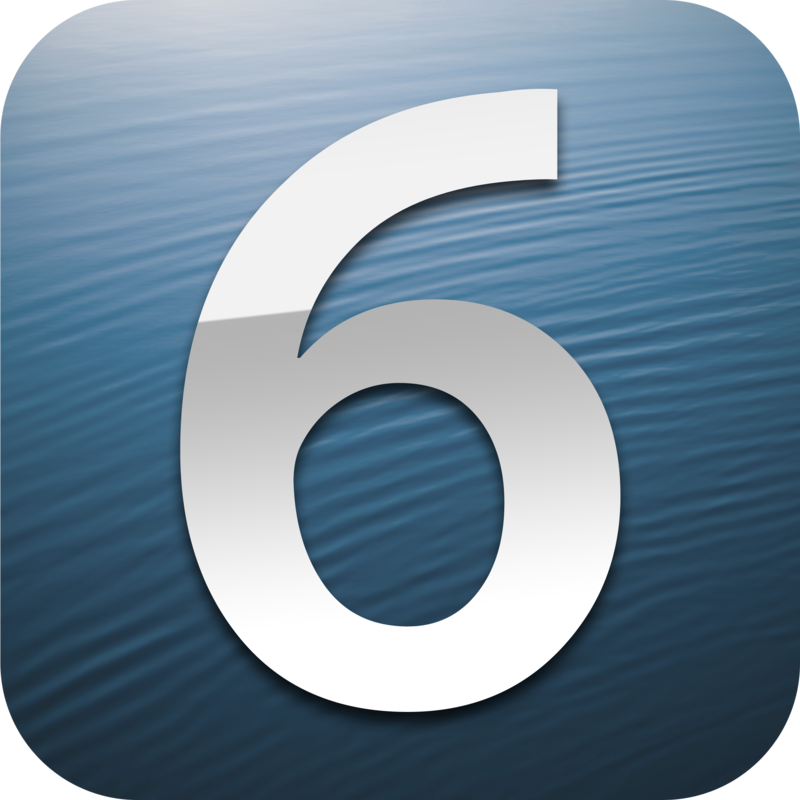

- iOS 6 home screen on an iPhone 5
- Working state: No longer supported
- Source model: Closed, with open source components
- Initial release: September 19, 2012; 14 years ago
- Latest release: 6.1.6 (10B500) / February 21, 2014; 12 years ago
- Update method: Software Update
- Package manager: App Store
- Supported platforms: iPhone, iPod Touch, iPad
- Kernel type: Hybrid (XNU)
- Default user interface: Springboard
- License: Proprietary EULA except for open-source components
- Preceded by: iOS 5
- Succeeded by: iOS 7
- Official website: Apple - iOS 6 at the Wayback Machine (archived September 4, 2013)
- Tagline: It takes your iPhone, iPad, and iPod touch in entirely new directions.

Support status
- Obsolete, unsupported

iOS 6 is the sixth major release of the iOS mobile operating system developed by Apple Inc., being the successor to iOS 5. It was announced at the 2012 Worldwide Developers Conference on June 11, 2012, and was released on September 19, 2012. It was succeeded by iOS 7 on September 18, 2013. It was also the last iOS major release to feature a skeuomorphic design, as iOS 7 would introduce a completely new flat design overhaul.

iOS 6 introduced Apple Maps, which replaced Google Maps as the default mapping service for the operating system; a dedicated Podcasts app, as a central location for podcasts; and a Passbook app, for managing different types of tickets, boarding passes, coupons, and loyalty cards. The App Store received a visual overhaul, featuring a card-based app layout and improved search algorithms. Facebook integration was added to the operating system, allowing status messages, like buttons, and contact and event synchronization with several of Apple's apps. New privacy controls gave users more fine-grained app permissions, as well as an option to prevent targeted advertising. Siri was expanded to more devices and updated with more functionality, such as the ability to make restaurant reservations, launch apps, retrieve movie reviews and sports statistics, and read items from the Notification Center. iOS 6 also added LTE support for more carriers, the ability to purchase movie tickets through Fandango with Siri (USA only), a new button to reset the Advertising Identifier, and improvements to Maps in Japan. Additionally, iOS 6 improved the Photos and Camera apps, allowing users to share photos with iCloud Photo Stream, add filters to their camera shots, and take panoramic photos. The Phone app also received some enhancements, such as the option to reply with a message or set a callback reminder when declining a call, and the ability to enable a Do Not Disturb mode.

iOS 6 received positive reviews. Critics noted that the operating system did not offer any significant speed improvements or major redesigns, but instead focused on refinements, with a general consensus that Apple "isn't overhauling things for the sake of it." iOS 6 did not "completely change the way you use your device," but "each of the tweaks will make many daily smartphone actions easier across the board," and critics praised the refinement of "something that already works extremely well" as "something other companies would do well to emulate."

The release of Apple Maps, however, drew significant criticism, due to inaccurate or incomplete data. The issues prompted an open letter of apology from Apple CEO Tim Cook. Scott Forstall, who had overseen iOS development since its inception, announced his departure from the company shortly after the release of iOS 6.

iOS 6 is the last version of iOS that supports the iPhone 3GS and the fourth-generation iPod Touch.

== History ==
iOS 6 was introduced at the Apple Worldwide Developers Conference on June 11, 2012. It was officially released on September 19, 2012.

== System features ==
iOS 6.0.1 home screen on an iPad (4th generation)

=== Siri ===
Apple's Siri intelligent personal assistant, introduced in iOS 5 with the release of the iPhone 4s, was updated to include the ability to make restaurant reservations, launch apps, read items from the Notification Center, dictate Facebook and Twitter updates, retrieve movie reviews, detailed sports statistics, and more.

Siri received language support for Italian, Korean, and Cantonese, and device support for the iPhone 5, fifth-generation iPod Touch, and third-generation iPad.

In iOS 6.1, Siri was integrated with Fandango, allowing users to buy film tickets by voice. The feature was only available in the United States at launch.

=== Facebook integration ===
Facebook came integrated in several of Apple's native apps with iOS 6. Facebook features could be directly accessed from within native apps such as Calendar, which could synchronize Facebook events; Contacts, which could show Facebook friend information, and the App Store and Game Center, which featured Facebook's like button; as well as through a widget in the Notification Center, which allowed users to post status updates to the social network.

=== Settings ===
The Settings app received multiple changes in iOS 6. The icon was revised to match the System Preferences icon used in OS X, and a "Do Not Disturb" mode was added, which allows users to disable phone sounds. Additional options for Do Not Disturb mode include being able to allow phone calls from a specific group of contacts, and allowing sound on the second call if someone calls repeatedly. A crescent moon icon will appear in the status bar when Do Not Disturb mode is enabled.

New privacy settings became available to users. In addition to "Location Services," the following menus were added in iOS 6: "Contacts," "Calendars," "Reminders," and "Photos." The updated privacy menus allow users more fine-grained privacy permission controls for each app, with new notifications when apps want access to information in each of the categories.

iOS 6 also came with a "Limit ad tracking" user control setting to allow users the option to prevent targeted advertising. Apple's "Advertising Identifier" was described by Apple as "a non-permanent, non-personal, device identifier, that advertising networks will use to give you more control over advertisers' ability to use tracking methods. If you choose to limit ad tracking, advertising networks using the Advertising Identifier may no longer gather information to serve you targeted ads."

In iOS 6.1, a "Reset Advertising Identifier" setting was added to allow users to reset the identifier used by advertising companies.

=== Notification center ===
iOS 6 added a Twitter widget, where users could tweet without going into the app. This saved resources.

=== App grid ===
A newly downloaded app now shows a banner reading as such.

=== Other ===
The Share Sheet interface was updated to display a grid of icons, as opposed to a list, of different apps to which users could share content.

== App features ==
=== Maps ===
A new Apple Maps app replaced Google Maps as the default mapping app on the operating system. Apple Maps used Apple's vector-based engine, making for smoother zooming. New to Maps was turn-by-turn navigation with spoken directions and 3D views in certain countries, "Flyover" views in some major cities, and real-time traffic.

At launch, turn-by-turn navigation was only available for the iPhone 4s and later, and iPad 2 (cellular capability required) and later, while "Flyover" view was only available for iPhone 4s and later, fifth-generation iPod Touch, and iPad 2 and later.

=== Passbook ===
A new Passbook app was added, to retrieve documents such as boarding passes, admission tickets, coupons and loyalty cards.

An iOS device with Passbook can replace a physical card when scanned to process a mobile payment at participating locations. The app has context-aware features such as notifications for relevant coupons when in the immediate vicinity of a given store, and automatic visibility of boarding passes when the user is at an airport, with notifications for gate changes.

=== Photos and Camera ===
The Camera app was updated to include a new Panorama mode that allowed users to take 240-degree panoramic photos.

The Photos app received updates to the Photo Stream functionality, letting users remove images, as well as share custom Photo Streams with other people or the public.

=== App Store ===
The App Store on iOS 6 had a brand new user interface that removed the "Categories" tab and replaced it with "Genius," Apple's search and recommendation engine. It also made use of cards rather than lists to present apps. There were also tweaks to the App Store's search algorithm, resulting in a "trend to favor newer companies," which sparked both developer concerns and praise.

The App Store also updated apps without requiring the iTunes password, and when installing or updating an app, users were no longer automatically returned to the home screen.

=== Phone ===
Upon receiving calls, iOS 6 enabled users to swipe up the lock screen to reveal "Reply with message" or "Remind me later." The "Reply with message" feature shows several pre-determined messages with an option for a custom message, while the "Remind me later" feature offers several options (such as an hour later, when the user gets home, or when the user leaves the current location) to enable a reminder.

=== Podcasts ===
Podcast functionality was separated from the iTunes app and received its own Podcasts app in iOS 6, in order to "centralize and promote podcast listening and downloading for users."

=== Safari ===
The Safari web browser was updated with a full-screen landscape view for iPhone and iPod Touch users. Reading List also received offline support, in which text, images, and layout from saved articles get stored on the user's device.

=== FaceTime ===
FaceTime video calling was updated to work over a cellular connection, in addition to Wi-Fi.

=== Clock ===
The Clock app, which had been on iPhone and iPod Touch since their original release, became available on iPad. The clock design looked similar to a Swiss railway clock, and Apple formed an agreement with the Swiss Federal Railways to license the design for its own use.

=== Music ===
The Music app was redesigned for iPhone and iPod Touch users. The interface was now completely white, while the Now Playing UI was now equipped with motion sensitive scrubber bars similar to the iPod Nano 7th generation. The three buttons for controlling the music were also redesigned.

A comparison between the two music players
iOS 5 and below	iOS 6

=== YouTube ===
The YouTube app, which had been a default app on iOS since its release, was removed. Apple told The Verge that the reason for the removal was due to an expired license, but that YouTube users could still view videos through the Safari web browser. The company also confirmed that Google, which owns YouTube, was developing its own app, with a then-upcoming release through the App Store. The Apple-developed YouTube app remained on iOS 5 and previous iOS versions. In June 2017, former YouTube employee Hunter Walk tweeted that Apple contacted YouTube to make it a default app on the original iPhone to ensure mass market mobile launch for the video-sharing service, but required handling development efforts itself. In 2012, YouTube made the "gutsy move" to discontinue the license in an effort to "take back control of our app" by developing it themselves.

== Reception ==
The reception of iOS 6 was positive. Dan Seifert of The Verge wrote that "iOS 6 looks nearly identical to iOS 5. There are a few subtle tweaks here and there. But for every small change to the look of iOS details, there are ten things that remain the same." While praising the iPhone 4s for being a "snappy performer," he noted that "When it comes to speed, iOS 6 doesn't feel terribly different from iOS 5". Craig Grannell of TechRadar wrote that "iOS 6 is rather like the iPhone 5 or OS X Mountain Lion - the refinement of something that already works extremely well. Apple isn't overhauling things for the sake of it but, in the main, making the iOS experience gradually better. That in itself is something other companies would do well to emulate." Jason Parker of CNET wrote that "iOS 6 is a welcome upgrade for any iOS user, but it's not going to completely change the way you use your device. Instead, each of the tweaks here will make many daily smartphone actions easier across the board and offer some relief to those waiting for certain features (sending images from email and call controls, for example)."

== Problems ==
=== Maps app launch ===
In iOS 6, Apple replaced Google Maps with its own Apple Maps as the default mapping service for the operating system, and immediately faced criticism for inaccurate or incomplete data, including a museum in a river, missing towns, very inaccurate directions, satellite images obscured by clouds, missing local places, and more.

Apple CEO Tim Cook issued a letter on Apple's website apologizing for the "frustration caused by the Maps application," and recommended downloading alternative map apps from the App Store. Scott Forstall, the then-VP of iOS software engineering, was involuntarily dismissed from his role at Apple in October 2012 after he "refused to sign his name to a letter apologizing for shortcomings in Apple's new mapping service."

=== Advertising Identifier privacy skepticism ===
In September 2012, Sarah Downey, a "privacy expert" with the software company Abine expressed her concern that in spite of the new "Advertising Identifier," Apple didn't disclose details on what the identifier was actually based on. She stated: "I need them to tell me why it's not identifying because as we've seen from a lot other "non-identifying" pieces of data, they can identify you quite easily," and that "If you're using the opt-out, [Apple] may no longer gather information to serve you targeted ads. To me, that says they may still collect your information to do things other than serve you targeted ads, like build databases about you to send you marketing or to sell to third parties."

=== Abnormal data usage ===
Many users reported a higher-than-normal data usage after upgrading to iOS 6, causing some to be heavily billed for data largely exceeding their data plan. Steve Rosenbaum of The Huffington Post wrote that "The bug is the result of an iOS 6 problem that connects the phone to the cellular data network whenever the phone is connected to a WiFi signal," and also stated that Apple had released a patch.

=== FaceTime certificate expiration ===
In April 2014, users who were still running iOS 6 could not connect to FaceTime due to the expiration of a certificate. Apple released a support document explaining the problem, adding that devices capable of upgrading to iOS 7 must do so to fix the issue, while devices stuck on iOS 6 would receive an iOS 6.1.6 update.

== Supported devices ==
Given some of the new iOS 6 features required a rear & front camera, and other iOS 6 compatible devices having similar hardware did not support many of the new features such as the iPhone 3GS and the iPod Touch (4th generation), therefore, with this release, Apple dropped support for devices that did not include a camera, thus the third-generation iPod Touch and the first-generation iPad did not receive the iOS 6 update. iOS 6 is the first version of iOS to drop support for an iPad.

=== iPhone ===
- iPhone 3GS
- iPhone 4
- iPhone 4S
- iPhone 5

=== iPod Touch ===
- iPod Touch (4th generation)
- iPod Touch (5th generation)

=== iPad ===
- iPad 2
- iPad (3rd generation)
- iPad (4th generation)
- iPad Mini (1st generation)

== Version history ==
Version	Build	Codename	Release date	Notes
6.0	10A402; 10A403; 10A405 (Note: iPhone 5 only); 10A406 (Note: iPad mini (1st generation) and iPod Touch (5th generation) only); 10A407 (Note: iPad (4th generation) only)	Sundance	August 27, 2012; September 19, 2012; September 21, 2012; October 11, 2012; November 2, 2012	Initial release on iPhone 5, iPod touch (5th generation), iPad mini (1st generation), and iPad (4th generation): Introduces Apple Maps, to replace Google Maps.; Siri can now tell you sport related information.; Facebook has now been integrated into Settings.; FaceTime calls can now be done over cellular data on iPhone 4S, iPhone 5, and iPad 3 (Wi-Fi + Cellular).; Do Not Disturb can be activated to suppress incoming calls and notifications.; Adds a Reply with Message feature if a call is declined.; Adds the Clock app to the iPad.; Custom vibrations can be set for alerts on iPhone.; Fixes a bug that allows a local attacker to learn what third-party app was in use before the device was locked.; Fixes bugs that allowed a local attacker to bypass a device locked with a passcode.; Fixes a bug that allowed a local attacker to initiate a FaceTime call on a locked device.; Fixes a bug that allowed users to make purchases without inputting Apple ID credentials.; Fixes a bug that caused SMS messages to disrupt cellular connectivity.
6.0.1	10A523; 10A525; 10A8426 (Note: iPad (4th generation) (Wi-Fi + Cellular) and iPad mini (1st generation) (Wi-Fi + Cellular) only)	Sundance	October 29, 2012	Fixes a bug that prevented iPhone 5 from installing updates wirelessly.; Fixes a bug that prevented camera flash from activating.; Fixes a bug that prevented cellular connectivity from being available.; Fixes a bug that allowed a maliciously crafted website to execute arbitrary code
6.0.2	10A550 (Note: iPad mini (1st generation) (Wi-Fi) only); 10A551; 10A8500 (Note: iPad mini (1st generation) (Wi-Fi + Cellular) only)	Sundance	December 13, 2012	iPhone 5 and iPad mini (1st generation) only: Fixes a bug that prevented Wi-Fi from working
6.1	10B137; 10B141; 10B142 (Note: iPhone 4S only); 10B143; 10B144 (Note: iPhone 4 (GSM) and iPod Touch (4th generation) only)	Brighton	January 7, 2013; January 28, 2013	iOS 6.1 changed the lock screen music controls. The new controls have a more silver appearance, from its previous appearance which was more blue. Also the clock was shrunk while playing music, where in iOS 6.0 and previous versions it was still legible as normal.; Adds support for more LTE cellular carriers; Integrates Siri and Fandango to allow Siri to purchase movie tickets (U.S. only).; Adds the Reset Advertising Identifier button in Settings.; iTunes Match subscribers can download individual songs from iCloud.
6.1.1	10B145	Brighton	February 11, 2013	iPhone 4S only, improves cellular reliability for iPhone 4S.
6.1.2	10B146; 10B147	Brighton	February 19, 2013	Fixes a bug in Exchange calendar that increased network activity and reduced battery life.
6.1.3	10B329	BrightonMaps	March 13, 2013	Fixes a bug that allowed a passcode lock screen bypass to access the Phone app.; Improves the Maps app in Japan.; Fixes a bug that allowed a user to execute unsigned code.
Exclusive to iPhone 5
6.1.4	10B350	BrightonMaps	April 27, 2013	Fixes a speakerphone bug for iPhone 5
Exclusive to iPod touch (4th generation)
6.1.5	10B400	BrightonMaps	November 14, 2013	Fixes a bug for iPod Touch 4 that caused FaceTime calls to fail.
Exclusive to iPhone 3GS and iPod touch (4th generation)
6.1.6	10B500	BrightonMaps	February 21, 2014	Fixes the infamous goto fail; SSL verification bug.

Preceded by iOS 5	iOS 6; 2012	Succeeded by iOS 7
