= IPod Touch (5th generation) =

Mobile device made by Apple Inc.

iPod Touch
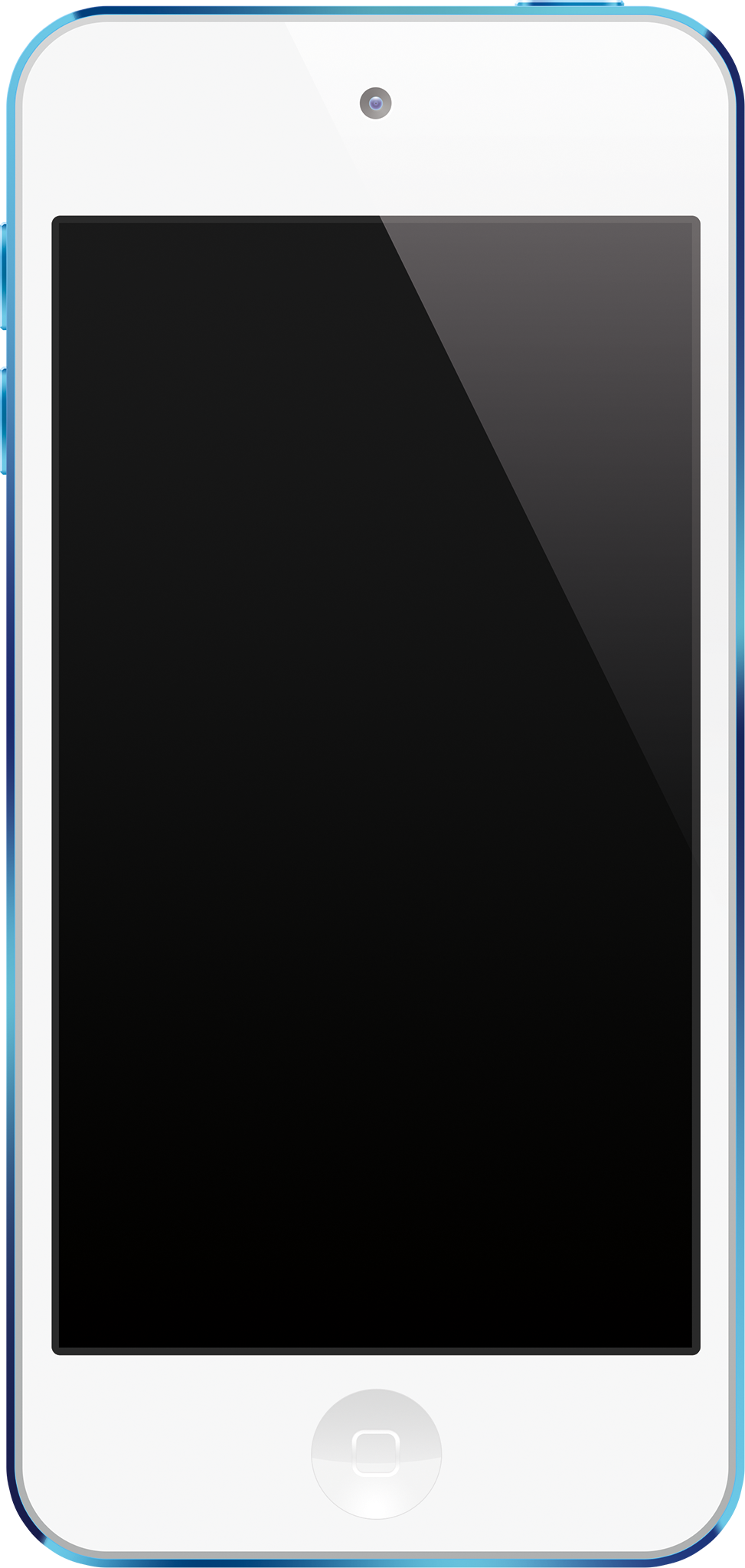
- iPod Touch (5th generation) in blue
- Developer: Apple Inc.
- Manufacturer: Apple Inc.
- Product family: iPod
- Type: Mobile device
- Released: October 11, 2012 (32 and 64 GB); May 30, 2013 (16 GB 2013); June 26, 2014 (16 GB 2014)
- Lifespan: October 11, 2012 – July 15, 2015
- Discontinued: July 15, 2015
- Operating system: Original: iOS 6.0; Last: iOS 9.3.5, released August 25, 2016
- System on a chip: Dual-core Apple A5
- CPU: ARM dual-core Cortex-A9 Apple A5 1 GHz (underclocked to 800 MHz)
- Memory: 512 MB DRAM
- Storage: 16, 32 or 64 GB flash memory
- Display: 4 in (100 mm) diagonal (16:9 aspect ratio), multi-touch display, LED backlit IPS TFT LCD, 1136×640 px at 326 PPI; 800:1 contrast ratio (typical), 500 cd/m^{2} max. brightness (typical), fingerprint-resistant oleophobic coating
- Graphics: PowerVR SGX543MP2
- Input: Multi-touch touchscreen display; Volume buttons; Microphone; Built-in speaker; voice control; 3-axis gyroscope; 3-axis Accelerometer
- Camera: Rear: 5 MP back-side illuminated sensor HD video recording 1080p up to 30 frames/s with audio Aperture f/2.4 Facial recognition (stills only) Panorama; Front: FaceTime HD camera with 1.2 MP HD video recording 720p up to 30 frames/s with audio
- Connectivity: Wi-Fi 802.11a/b/g/n (802.11n 2.4 GHz and 5 GHz); Bluetooth 4.0
- Power: 3.7 V, 3.8 Wh (1030 mAh) rechargeable lithium-ion battery Audio: 40 hours; Video: 8 hours
- Online services: App Store, iTunes Store, iBookstore, iCloud, Passbook - iOS 8 and below, Wallet - iOS 9 only
- Dimensions: 123.4 mm (4.86 in) H 58.6 mm (2.31 in) W 6.1 mm (0.24 in) D
- Weight: 88 g (3.1 oz)
- Predecessor: iPod Touch (4th generation)
- Successor: iPod Touch (6th generation)
- Related: iPhone 4s iPhone 5

The fifth generation iPod Touch (stylized and marketed as the iPod touch, and colloquially known as the iPod Touch 5G or iPod Touch 5) is a mobile device designed and marketed by Apple Inc. with a touchscreen-based user interface. The successor to the 4th-generation iPod Touch, it was unveiled at Apple's media event alongside the iPhone 5 on September 12, 2012, and was released on October 11, 2012. It is compatible with up to iOS 9.3.5, which was released on August 25, 2016.

Like the iPhone 5, the fifth-generation iPod Touch is a slimmer, lighter model that introduces a higher-resolution, 4-inch screen to the series with 16:9 widescreen aspect ratio, similar to the iPhone 5, 5c, and 5s. Other improvements include support for recording 1080p video and panoramic still photos via the rear camera, an LED flash, Apple's A5 chip (the same chip used in the iPad Mini (1st generation), iPad 2, and iPhone 4s) and support for Apple's Siri.

The fifth-generation iPod Touch was released with more color options than its predecessors. It initially featured with a black screen and slate back and a white screen with five back color options including silver, pink, yellow, blue, and Product Red, however on the release of the iPhone 5S the slate color was changed to space gray and all the other colors remained unchanged.

The device was initially only sold in 32 GB and 64 GB models. The first 16 GB model, introduced on May 30, 2013, was only available in one color combination (black screen with a silver back) and lacks the rear iSight camera, LED flash and the iPod Touch Loop that is included in the 32 GB models. On June 26, 2014, it was replaced with a new 16 GB model that no longer omits the rear camera and full range of color options. The pricing for the iPod Touch had also changed. The 16 GB model was changed to $199 instead of $229, the 32 GB model is $249 instead of $299, and the 64 GB model is $299 instead of $399. The iPod Touch (5th generation) was officially discontinued by Apple on July 15, 2015, with the release of its successor, the iPod Touch (6th generation).

== Features ==
=== Software ===
The fifth generation iPod Touch features iOS, Apple's mobile operating system.

Initially shipped with iOS 6, which was released on September 19, 2012, it can play music, movies, television shows, eBooks, audiobooks, and podcasts and can sort its media library by songs, artists, albums, videos, playlists, genres, composers, podcasts, audiobooks, and compilations. Users can rotate their device horizontally to landscape mode to access Cover Flow. This feature shows the different album covers in a scroll-through photo library. Scrolling is achieved by swiping a finger across the screen. Alternatively, headset controls can be used to pause, play, skip, and repeat tracks. However, the EarPods that come with the iPod do not include a remote and mic.

Like the iPhone 4S and later models, the fifth generation iPod Touch was the first in the iPod Touch line-up to support Siri, which allows the user to operate the device by spoken commands. The software was improved in iOS 6 to include the ability to make restaurant reservations, launch apps, dictate Facebook or Twitter (now X) updates, retrieve movie reviews and detailed sports statistics. Some newer applications and features that came with iOS 6 included Apple Maps, Passbook and screen mirroring. AirPlay was made available, which allows screen mirroring through an Apple TV or other supported external device allows the screen of the iPod Touch to be mirrored, and was the first generation of the iPod Touch to support it.

iOS 7 was released on September 18, 2013 to all iOS devices. This generation was the only iPod Touch in the iPod Touch line-up to run iOS 7. On June 2, 2014, it was announced that the iPod Touch 5th generation would receive iOS 8 that fall. It was released on September 17, 2014.

It was confirmed on June 8, 2015, at WWDC 2015 that the iPod Touch 5th generation would support iOS 9. This made it the first iPod touch to support 4 major versions of iOS being iOS 6, iOS 7, iOS 8 and iOS 9. Other A5-based devices also supported iOS 9 including the iPad 2 (6 major iOS versions), the iPhone 4s (5 major iOS versions) and the iPad mini 1st generation (4 major iOS versions). iOS 9.3.5 is the last update that supports the iPod Touch 5th generation as it is incompatible with iOS 10 along with the iPhone 4s, iPad 2 and 3, and iPad mini 1st generation due to hardware limitations.

=== Hardware ===
The fifth generation iPod Touch features the Apple A5 chip which is similar to the one on the iPhone 4S, iPad 2 and the iPad Mini. The chip comprises a 1 GHz dual core ARM Cortex-A9 processor and a PowerVR SGX543MP2 (2-core) GPU making it faster than the fourth generation iPod Touch, which uses the Apple A4 chip. Storage capacities are available at 32 or 64 GB with a 16 GB announced at a later date to replace the previous generation.

The Retina Display of the iPod is similar to the one on the iPhone 5, measuring 1,136 by 640 pixels with an aspect ratio of almost exactly 16:9. Measuring 4 inches diagonally, it has a display size of 6.7 square inches and a pixel density of 326 ppi which remains the same as the fourth generation. Screen icons are arranged in a matrix of 6 rows of 4 icons each. With a larger screen than the previous generation model, the fifth generation iPod Touch allows a 6th row of icons to be added to the 5 rows that were present in the fourth generation iPod Touch. However, the fifth generation iPod Touch does not include an ambient light sensor which was included in the previous generation. The new iSight camera has 5 megapixels and is capable of 1080p video recording with an illuminated sensor and a LED flash. The front-facing camera was also upgraded to 1.2 megapixels capable of 720p video compared to the VGA 0.3 megapixels front camera on the fourth generation.

=== Design ===
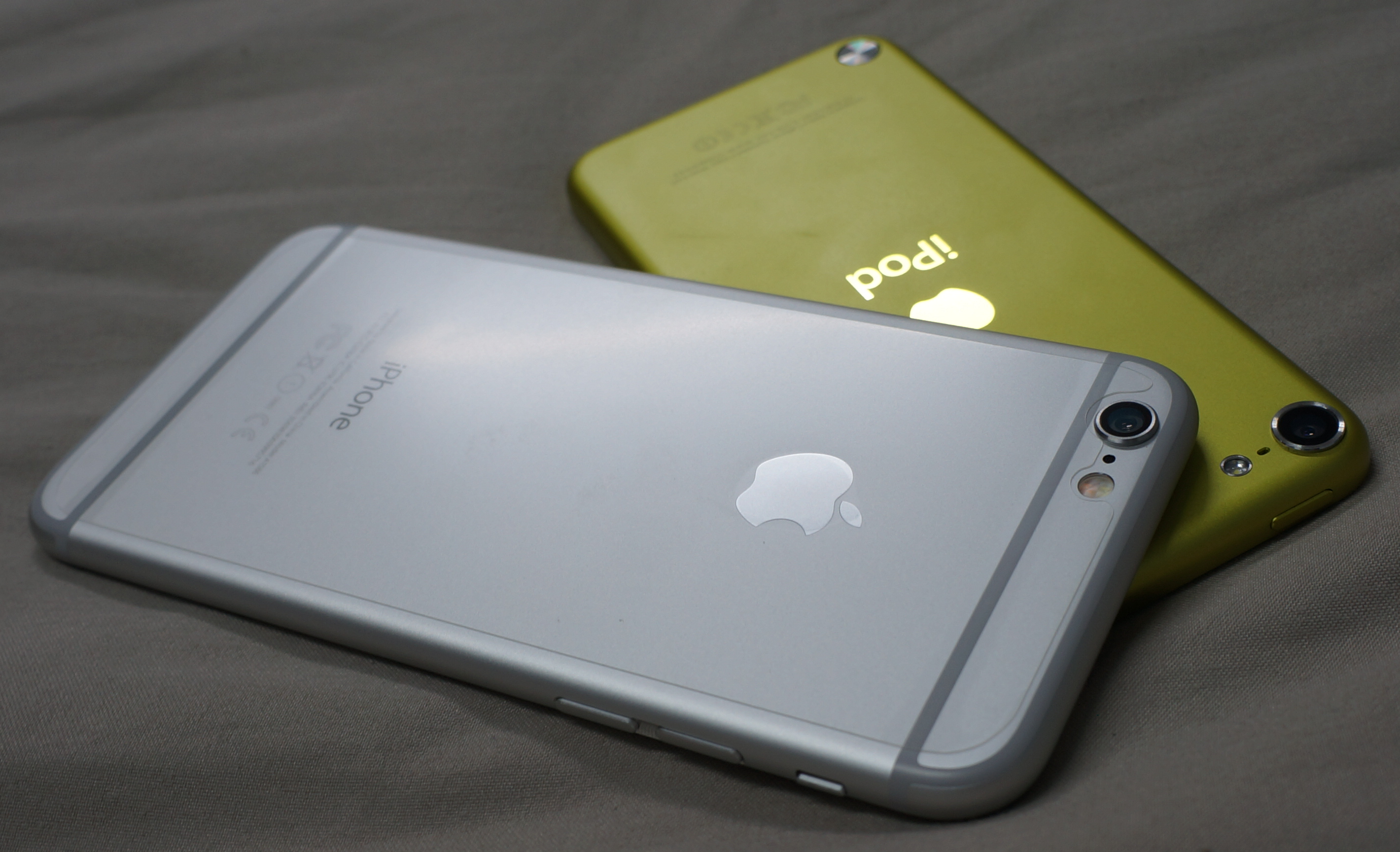
iPod touch 5th gen next to iPhone 6

Fifth-generation iPod touch in black

The fifth-generation iPod Touch's finish features an aluminum unibody, which is made from the same kind of anodized aluminum used in the MacBook line. With a new iSight camera and LED flash, the iPod Touch includes a new feature known as the iPod Touch Loop. At the bottom left corner of the back of the iPod Touch, there is a button that can be pressed to allow a wrist strap to attach to the iPod Touch. Other changes to the iPod Touch include the addition of colors and the return of the black Wi-Fi antenna.

A 16 GB version that did not include the iSight camera, LED flash and Loop was released on May 30, 2013. This model was replaced with a 16 GB model of the original design on June 26, 2014.

Back Color Name	Front	Camera Ring	Loop Button	Antenna	Capacities Available
Slate	Black	Black	Black	Black	32 GB; 64 GB
Space Gray	Black	Black	Silver	Black	16 GB; 32 GB; 64 GB
Silver	White	Silver	Silver	Black	16 GB; 32 GB; 64 GB
Yellow	White	Silver	Silver	Black	16 GB; 32 GB; 64 GB
Blue	White	Silver	Silver	Black	16 GB; 32 GB; 64 GB
Pink	White	Silver	Silver	Black	16 GB; 32 GB; 64 GB
(PRODUCT) Red	White	Silver	Silver	Black	16 GB; 32 GB; 64 GB

=== Accessories ===
Apple Lightning connector

The fifth generation iPod Touch, as well as the iPhone 5, iPod Nano (7th generation), iPad (4th generation), and iPad Mini feature a new dock connector named Lightning, replacing the 30-pin Apple dock connector which was first introduced by Apple in 2003 on the third generation iPod. The Apple Lightning connector has eight pins and all signaling is digital. The new connector also can be inserted either way, unlike the 30-pin connector which can only be inserted in one way. Adapters will be released by Apple to convert the Apple Lightning connector to the older 30-pin Apple Dock connector or USB, although not all accessories will work with the adapter as not all signals are available, in particular video output and the iPod Out feature for BMW automobiles.

Earphones known as Apple EarPods are also included with the fifth generation iPod touch and other devices announced at the Apple media event on September 12, 2012. They superseded earphones that were included with previous generation iPhones and iPods. According to technology commentators, the redesign of the earphones is aimed to improve sound quality by allowing air to travel in and out more freely. Apple states that the redesign of their earphones allows it to "rival high-end headphones that cost hundreds of dollars more". Reviews by Gizmodo and TechRadar reported that although the redesigned earphones sounded better than its predecessor, reviewers felt that the quality of sound produced was still underwhelming. Both have further stated that the EarPods pale in comparison to other earphones of a similar price.

Other accessories that were sold with the iPod Touch include the lanyard for the iPod Touch loop (not available for the 16 GB model.)

== Reception ==
Andrew Williams from TrustedReviews noted the 5th generation iPod touch's common features with the iPhone 5, while praising the design and the respectable connectivity. Graham Barlow of TechRadar commended the improved screen, more color variants, greater quality earphones and the iPod's light weight while criticizing the "reset" of the lightning port. Scott Stein of CNET praised the enhanced camera quality and design, but remarked that the iPod touch is still weaker and outclassed compared to other iOS devices.

== See also ==
- List of iPod models
- List of iOS devices

Preceded by iPod Touch (4th generation)	iPod Touch (5th generation); September 2012 - July 2015	Succeeded by iPod Touch (6th generation)
