= IOS 5 =

2011 mobile operating system

iOS 5
- Version of the iOS operating system

- iOS 5 home screen on an iPhone 4s
- Developer: Apple Inc.
- Working state: No longer supported
- Source model: Closed, with open source components
- Initial release: October 12, 2011; 15 years ago
- Latest release: 5.1.1 / May 25, 2012; 14 years ago
- Update method: Software Update
- Package manager: App Store
- Supported platforms: iPhone, iPod Touch, iPad
- Kernel type: Hybrid (XNU)
- License: Proprietary EULA except for open-source components
- Preceded by: iOS 4
- Succeeded by: iOS 6
- Official website: Apple - iOS 5 - 200+ new features for iPad, iPhone, and iPod Touch. at the Wayback Machine (archived September 10, 2012)
- Tagline: We've taken iOS to a whole new level.

Support status
- Obsolete, unsupported

iOS 5 is the fifth major release of the iOS mobile operating system developed by Apple Inc., being the successor to iOS 4. It was announced at the company's Worldwide Developers Conference on June 6, 2011, and was released on October 12, 2011. It was succeeded by iOS 6 on September 19, 2012.

iOS 5 revamped notifications, adding temporary banners that appear at the top of the screen and introducing the Notification Center, a central location for all recent notifications. iOS 5 also added iCloud, Apple's cloud storage service for synchronization of content and data across iCloud-enabled devices, and iMessage, Apple's instant messaging service. For the first time, software updates could be installed wirelessly, without requiring a computer and iTunes. iOS 5 also featured deep integration with Twitter, introduced multitasking gestures on iPads, and added an easily accessible camera shortcut from the lock screen.

iOS 5 was the subject of criticism for iPhone 4s users, as the initial release had poor battery life, failures of SIM cards, and echoes during phone calls. These problems were fixed in subsequent releases.

iOS 5 is the last version of iOS that supports the third-generation iPod Touch and first-generation iPad.

== History ==
=== Introduction and initial release ===
iOS 5 was introduced at the Apple Worldwide Developers Conference on June 6, 2011, with a beta version available for developers later that day.

iOS 5 was officially released on October 12, 2011.

== System features ==
iOS 5.1 home screen on an iPad (3rd generation)

=== Notifications ===
In previous iOS versions, notifications popped up on the screen as dialog boxes, interrupting the current activity. In iOS 5, notifications are revamped, and show up as a temporary banner at the top of the screen. Recent notifications can also be accessed by pulling a "Notification Center" down from the top of the screen. Users who prefer the old notification system can keep it by choosing the appropriate option in the Settings menu.

=== iCloud ===
iOS 5 introduces iCloud, Apple's cloud storage service. The new service allows users to synchronize their music, photos, videos, and application data across all of their iCloud-enabled devices for free.

=== Wireless updates ===
iOS 5 enables Wireless system updates on supported devices, meaning a computer and iTunes aren't necessary to update devices. Both activation of new devices and updates can be done wirelessly.

=== Twitter integration ===
iOS 5 features deep Twitter integration. Users are able to sign in to Twitter directly from the Settings menu. Photos can be "tweeted" directly from the Photos or Camera apps, and users are also able to tweet from the Safari, YouTube, and Google Maps apps.

=== Multitasking ===
Multitasking gestures debut on the iPad with the release of iOS 5. Multitasking allows users to jump between apps without double-tapping the home button or first going to the home screen. Multitasking gestures were only available on the iPad 2.

=== Keyboard ===
The iPad keyboard could be undocked from the bottom of the screen, and could be split into two half-keyboards.

=== Siri ===
Siri, Apple's voice assistant, is supported on the iPhone 4s only. It was later extended to other devices (such as the iPhone 5) in iOS 6 and expanded further with each new major software release.

== App features ==
=== App Store ===
The updater in the App Store no longer treats updates as separate apps from version to version, meaning users no longer has to redownload the app to receive the changes made. This is done to be consistent with the Mac App Store in Mac OS X Lion.

=== Photos and Camera ===
The first iOS 5 release allowed the Camera app to be easily accessed from the lock screen for the first time. If users double-clicked the home button, a camera icon would appear next to the "slide to unlock" message, and users would click on it to directly access the camera. The iOS 5.1 update streamlined this process by removing the home button double-click procedure, and replacing it with a process requiring users to swipe up the camera icon. For security purposes when the device is locked with a passcode, this method of accessing the camera only allows access to the Camera app, and no other features of the device.

Pressing the volume-up button allows the user to take a picture.

=== Messages ===
iMessage, a new instant messaging service built into the Messages app, allowed anyone with an iOS 5 device to send both basic and multimedia messages to anyone else with a compatible iOS 5 device. In contrast to SMS, messages sent through iMessage use the Internet rather than regular cellular texting, but also in contrast to regular SMS, Android and BlackBerry devices are not compatible with the service. iMessages are synchronized across the user's devices, and are color-coded blue, with regular SMS in green.

=== Mail ===
The Mail app included rich text formatting, better indent control, flagging of messages, and the ability to drag addresses between To, CC, and BCC lines.

=== Reminders ===
Reminders allows users to create lists of tasks with alerts that can either be date-based or location-based.

=== Newsstand ===
Newsstand does not act as a native app, but rather a special folder. When selected, it shows icons for all of the periodicals that the user has subscribed to, such as newspapers and magazines. New issues are downloaded automatically.

=== Music and Videos ===
The iPod app was replaced by separate Music and Videos apps on the iPhone and iPad, as with the iPod Touch.

== Problems ==
=== Initial upgrade issues ===
The initial October 2011 release of iOS 5 saw significant upgrade issues, with errors during installation and Apple server overload.

=== iPhone 4S battery life ===
Following user complaints, Apple officially confirmed that iOS 5 had poor battery life for some iPhone 4s users, and stated that an upcoming software update would fix the issues. The iOS 5.0.1 update fixed bugs related to battery issues.

=== Wi-Fi connectivity drops ===
In November 2011, Engadget reported that the iOS 5 update caused Wi-Fi connection drops for some users. The report also wrote that "The recent iOS 5.0.1 update certainly hasn't fixed the matter, either", and questioned whether the events were unrelated or part of a larger issue.

=== SIM card failure ===
Some iPhone 4s users reported issues with the SIM card in iOS 5, being given error messages about "Invalid SIM" and "SIM Failure". Apple released a second software build of the 5.0.1 update designed to fix SIM card issues.

=== Phone call echo ===
Some iPhone 4s users reported the random appearance of echoes during phone calls made with earphones in the initial release of iOS 5. The other party in the call was sometimes unable to hear the conversation due to this problem.

== Reception ==
Many aspects of iOS 5 received positive reviews, including the new notification center, the ability to sync and update wirelessly, iMessage, and more. Richmond Shane of Telegraph said "iOS 5 is a brilliant upgrade to an already brilliant operating system. Different people look for different things in a mobile operating system. That's why some people prefer BlackBerry, Android or Windows Mobile. I value ease of use and attention to detail in design. With iOS 5, Apple continues to deliver the best user experience available."

Richard Goodwin of Know Your Mobile said "All in all, we reckon iOS 5 is everything it needs to be and more. We can't wait to get our teeth stuck into it as soon as it's released in the Autumn of 2011."

== Supported devices ==
iOS 5 drops support for devices with less than 256 MB of RAM thus ending support for the iPhone 3G and the iPod Touch (2nd generation). The iPhone 4s has full support, the iPhone 4 and iPod touch (4th generation) have partial support, and the iPhone 3GS has limited support.

=== iPhone ===
- iPhone 3GS
- iPhone 4
- iPhone 4s

=== iPod Touch ===
- iPod Touch (3rd generation)
- iPod Touch (4th generation)

=== iPad ===
- iPad (1st generation)
- iPad 2
- iPad (3rd generation)

=== Apple TV ===
- Apple TV (2nd generation)
- Apple TV (3rd generation)

== Version history ==
Version	Build	Codename	Release date	Notes
5.0	9A334	Telluride	October 12, 2011	Initial release on iPhone 4s: Introduces iCloud; Devices can be set up, activated, and configured with Setup Assistant without iTunes; System updates can now be installed via Settings, not requiring iTunes; Music, Photos, Documents, Apps, Contacts, and more can be synced in iCloud; Find My iPhone allows users to track their iPhones running iOS 5; Apps and Books now have purchase history and can be automatically updated; Introduces the Notification Center; Notifications now briefly appear at the top of the screen; Notifications can be viewed from Lock Screen; Slide notifications on Lock Screen right to go to the app; Introduces iMessage; Other iOS 5 users can send and receive unlimited text, photo, and video messages with other iOS 5 users; iMessages can track delivery and read receipts; All messages are encrypted; Support for group messages; iMessage works over Wi-Fi and cellular; Integrates Twitter into Settings; Adds a Camera shortcut to a sleeping device; Double-click the home button to open the Camera app; Volume Up takes a picture; Overlays grid lines to better line up shots; Pinch to zoom is added to the preview screen; Red-eye removal, crop and rotate, and one-tap enhance edit features have been added to Photos; Text in Mail can be formatted with bold, italic, or underlines; Text can be indented; Personal photos can be used for Game Center profiles; Adds Multitasking Gestures to the iPad 2; Use 4 or 5 fingers to pinch to the home screen; Swipe left or right to switch between apps; Improves Accessibility features; LED flash can be lit when receiving a call or an alert on iPhone 4 and iPhone 4S; Highlighted text can be spoken aloud; Fixes a bug that allowed a user's Apple ID password to be logged to a local file; Fixes a bug that allowed remote attackers to reset a device; Fixes a bug that allowed local attackers to reset a device; Fixes a bug that allowed local attackers to recover the parental controls passcode
5.0.1	9A405	Telluride	November 10, 2011	Fixes a bug that caused iPhone battery life to deplete rapidly; Adds Multitasking Gestures to the iPad 1; Fixes a bug that caused Documents to fail to sync to iCloud; Improves voice recognition for Australian users; Fixes a bug that allowed an application to execute unsigned code; Fixes a bug that allowed local attackers to access user data on a locked iPad 2
5.0.1	9A406 (Note: iPhone 4s only)	Telluride	December 12, 2011	Fixes an issue that caused iPhone 4s users' phones to report "No SIM" or "No Service" when a valid, active SIM was inserted
5.1	9B176; 9B179	Hoodoo	March 7, 2012	Initial release on iPad (3rd generation): Adds Japanese support for Siri; Photos can be deleted from Photo Stream; The Camera shortcut is now always visible on Lock Screen for iPhone 3GS, iPhone 4, iPhone 4s, and iPod Touch (4th generation); Camera face detection now highlights all faces; The camera app has been redesigned for iPad 2; Adds Genius Mixes and Genius Playlists for iTunes Match subscribers; Audio for TV shows and movies is tweaked to sound louder and clearer for iPad; Adds playback speed and a 30-second rewind option for Podcasts on iPad; Improves battery life; Updates the AT&T network indicator; Fixes a bug that caused audio to drop for outgoing phone calls; Increases App Store app download limit over 3G to 50MB, from 20MB; Fixes a bug where applications could bypass their sandbox; Fixes a lock screen bypass; Fixes a bug that caused web browsing history to be recorded in Private Browsing
5.1.1	9B206	Hoodoo	May 7, 2012	Improves reliability of HDR photos being taken using the Lock Screen Camera shortcut; Fixes a bug that caused the iPad 2 to fail to switch between 2G and 3G networks; Fixes a bug that affected AirPlay video playback from working correctly; Fixes an issue where "Unable to Purchase" displayed after a successful App Store purchase; Fixes a bug that allowed a maliciously crafted website to spoof the currently loaded website link
5.1.1	9B208 (Note: iPhone 4 (GSM) only)	Hoodoo	May 25, 2012	Improves reliability of HDR photos being taken using the Lock Screen Camera shortcut; Fixes a bug that caused the iPad 2 to fail to switch between 2G and 3G networks; Fixes a bug that affected AirPlay video playback from working correctly; Fixes an issue where "Unable to Purchase" displayed after a successful App Store purchase; Fixes a bug that allowed a maliciously crafted website to spoof the currently loaded website link

Preceded by iOS 4	iOS 5; 2011	Succeeded by iOS 6
