= IPod Touch =

Series of mobile devices by Apple (2007–2022)

iPod Touch

- iPod Touch 6th generation in Pink
- Developer: Apple
- Manufacturer: Foxconn
- Product family: iPod
- Type: Multi-purpose mobile device
- Released: 1st gen: September 5, 2007; 2nd gen: September 9, 2008; 3rd gen: September 9, 2009; 4th gen: September 12, 2010; 5th gen: October 11, 2012 (32 & 64 GB models), May 2013 (16 GB model A1509), June 2014 (16 GB model A1421); 6th gen: July 15, 2015; 7th gen: May 28, 2019
- Discontinued: May 10, 2022; 4 years ago
- Units sold: 100 million (as of May 2013)
- Operating system: iOS
- Storage: 1st gen & 2nd gen: 8, 16 & 32 GB (Note: 1 GB = 1 billion bytes) flash memory; 3rd gen: 32 & 64 GB flash memory; 4th gen: 8, 16, 32 & 64 GB flash memory; 5th gen: 16, 32 & 64 GB flash memory; 6th gen: 16, 32, 64 & 128 GB flash memory; 7th gen: 32, 128 & 256 GB flash memory
- Input: Multi-touch touchscreen display; Volume buttons; Microphone; Built-in speaker; voice control; 3-axis accelerometer, gyroscope
- Online services: iTunes Store; App Store; iCloud; Apple Books; Podcasts; Apple Music; Apple Wallet
- Related: iPhone iPod Nano iPod Classic iPod Shuffle; Music (app)
- Website: support.apple.com/ipod-touch/

The iPod Touch (stylized as iPod touch) is a discontinued line of iOS-based mobile devices designed and formerly marketed by Apple with a touchscreen-controlled user interface. As with other iPod models, the iPod Touch can be used as a portable media player and a handheld gaming device, but can also be used as a digital camera, a web browser, and for email and messaging. It is nearly identical in design to the iPhone, and can run most iPhone third-party apps from the App Store, but it connects to the Internet only through Wi-Fi and uses no cellular network data, as it lacks a cellular modem.

The iPod Touch was introduced in September 2007, and around 100 million units were sold by May 2013. The final iPod Touch model, released on May 28, 2019, is the seventh-generation model.

iPod Touch models were distinguished by storage space and color; all models of the same generation typically offered identical features, performance, and operating system upgrades. An exception is the fifth generation, in which the low-end (16 GB) model was initially sold without a rear-facing camera and in a single color.

The iPod Touch was the last product in Apple's iPod product line after the discontinuation of the iPod Nano and iPod Shuffle on July 27, 2017, after which Apple revised the storage and pricing for the iPod Touch with 32 and 128 GB of storage. On May 10, 2022, Apple discontinued the iPod Touch, effectively ending the iPod product line. The last iOS version to support the seventh-generation iPod Touch is iOS 15.

== Features ==
=== Software ===
The iPod Touch ran on iOS, the same operating system as the iPhone. It included Safari, Google Maps, a Mail app, apps for Music and Videos, and several more. Users type on a virtual keyboard displayed on the screen. Apple operates online stores, allowing users to buy and directly download music, videos and third-party software. From launch, the iPod Touch was described by journalists as an "iPhone without the phone," and each succeeding iPod Touch model was introduced with the same release of iOS as the contemporary iPhone model.

On April 8, 2010, Apple announced iOS 4 in the Apple Special Event, covering seven main new features, such as multitasking, folders, mail enhancements, iBooks, better enterprise features, Game Center, and iAd. It supports both the iPod touch second, third and fourth-generation models, and this marks the first iOS release that drops the iPod touch first-generation. Prior to the release, iOS 4 was mostly criticized for the second-generation iPod Touch for not having multitasking and Home Screen wallpapers due to poor performance and lagging icon animations, while both the third and fourth-generation iPod Touches fully support all of the main seven and other hidden features covered in the Special Event.

iOS updates to iPod Touch models prior to iOS 4 were required to be purchased by their owners. Apple received criticism for this decision and for excluding certain iPhone features from the iPod Touch software. Apple's position was that they could add features for free to the iPhone because it realizes revenue via subscription, rather than as a one-time payment (as iPhones at the time were typically sold with a carrier contract). At WWDC in June 2010, as of iOS 4, Steve Jobs announced that Apple had "found a way" to make subsequent OS upgrades available free to iPod Touch owners.

In June 2011, iOS 5, the fifth major release of iOS software, was announced at Apple's WWDC 2011, adding notification, messaging, and reminder features. Apple limited some features, such as the voice control system Siri, which was only exclusive to the iPhone 4S on launch, and like the iPhone 4 and 3GS, it was absent for both the third- and fourth-generation iPod Touches.

The following year, iOS 6, which was released on September 19, 2012, for the fourth- and fifth-generation iPod Touch models, contains 200 new features, including Passbook, Facebook integration, and Apple Maps. The fifth-generation iPod Touch gained the ability to take panoramic photos, a feature shared with the iPhone 4S and iPhone 5.

On June 8, 2015, it was announced at the WWDC that the fifth-generation iPod Touch would support iOS 9, along with other A5 chip devices, becoming the first iPod Touch to support four major versions of iOS.

==== Setup and synchronization ====
iPod Touch units running iOS 4 or earlier were required to be connected to a Mac or PC for first-time setup. Downloading apps or media from the iTunes Store and App Store does not require a computer, though media not purchased through the iTunes Store still has to be added through a computer.

iPod Touch units produced since October 12, 2011 have iOS 5.0 or later preloaded; they can be set up wirelessly, without the need of a PC or Mac.

==== Purchasing content ====
To purchase content on the iPod Touch, the user must create an Apple Account or have an existing account. With this account one may download music and videos from the iTunes Store, apps from the App Store, or books from the Apple Books Store. An Apple Account created without a credit card can be used to get free content, and gift cards can be used to pay for apps instead of using a credit card.

==== Third-party applications ====
The only official way to obtain third-party applications for the iPod Touch is through Apple's App Store, which is a branch of iTunes Store. The App Store application, available in all versions of iOS from 2.0 onwards, allows users to browse and download applications from a single online repository (hosted by Apple) with the iTunes Store.

Sideloading apps outside the App Store is done through the Xcode application. It is intended for developers and enterprises, though tools for sideloading outside of Xcode exist, and are mainly used for applications not allowed in the App Store.

=== Design and hardware ===
The iPod Touch is generally similar to the iPhone models prior to the iPhone 6. Compared to a same-generation iPhone, an iPod Touch is thinner, lighter, and less expensive, while lacking some hardware and software features. Steve Jobs once referred to the iPod Touch as "training wheels for the iPhone."

All iPod Touch models lack biometric authentication, 3D Touch, NFC, GPS, an earpiece speaker, and a noise-cancelling microphone. Depending on the generation, the iPod Touch may have a smaller or inferior display and camera(s) compared to the iPhone. Newer models (fifth, sixth, and seventh generation) lack the ambient light sensor that makes automatic brightness available. The first-generation iPod Touch lacks a built-in speaker, and all iPod Touches prior to the fourth generation lack a microphone, camera, and flash. Starting with the 4th generation iPod Touch, a camera and microphone were added, and starting with the fifth-generation iPod Touch, LED flash was added.

The iPod Touch has no cellular modem, and therefore, cannot directly make phone calls on the public switched telephone network. However, it can make VoIP calls such as FaceTime, and send iMessages to other iPhones, Macs, iPads, and iPod Touch models with an Apple Account. The fifth-generation iPod Touch and later can forward and receive standard phone calls through a separate iPhone (a feature introduced in iOS 8), with the Wi-Fi Calling feature. The two devices must be linked to the same Apple Account, and the iPhone's carrier must support this feature.

==== Connectivity ====
Apple Lightning connector

The iPod Touch can communicate with a computer through Wi-Fi or USB using a cable and a dock connector.

iPod models released before 2012 feature a 30-pin dock connector (known colloquially as the iPod dock connector), which carried analog signals.

The fifth, sixth, and seventh generations of the iPod Touch feature a new digital dock connector, called Lightning, which was introduced alongside the iPhone 5, fourth-generation iPad and first-generation iPad Mini, and the seventh-generation iPod Nano models. This new connector is smaller than the previous one allowing for a slimmer form factor, and is reversible. Various accessories are available to connect the Apple Lightning connector to the older 30-pin dock connector or USB, although not all old accessories will work, because the Lightning connector cannot handle analog signals.

== User-made modifications ==
Like all of Apple's iOS devices, the iPod Touch is a tightly controlled platform. Communication between apps is limited and controlled, and Apple is the only authorized software vendor for firmware and applications. Hackers have attempted to "jailbreak" all iOS devices to enable forbidden or unsupported features, such as multitasking in iOS versions before 4.0, themes for the home screen, and enabling the battery-percentage indicator (limited to the iPhone prior to the seventh-generation iPod Touch). Jailbreaks for the iPod Touch first surfaced a month after the original model was released in September 2007, when hackers released JailbreakMe 1.0 (also called "AppSnapp") to jailbreak iPhone OS 1.1.1. This allowed users to install third-party programs on their devices before Apple permitted this with iPhone OS 2.

Apple's warranty statement implies that, after jailbreaking or other modification made by unofficial means, an iPod Touch is not covered by Apple's warranty. Jailbreaking is a violation of the terms and conditions for using iOS. While the jailbreaking process can normally be undone by performing a restore through iTunes, there is a risk of rendering the device unusable.

== Models ==
| Model | Announced | Release | | Discontinued | Latest release | | Support lifespan |
| Model | Announced | OS | Date | Discontinued | OS | Date | Support lifespan |
|---|---|---|---|---|---|---|---|
| iPod Touch (1st) | September 5, 2007 | iPhone OS 1.1 | September 5, 2007 | September 9, 2008 | iPhone OS 3.1.3 | June 21, 2010 | 2 years, 9 months |
| iPod Touch (2nd) | September 9, 2008 | iPhone OS 2.1.1 | September 9, 2008; September 9, 2009 (MC model) | September 9, 2009; September 1, 2010 (MC model) | iOS 4.2.1 | March 9, 2011 | 2 years, 6 months 1 year, 6 months (MC model) |
| iPod Touch (3rd) | September 9, 2009 | iPhone OS 3.1.1 | September 9, 2009 | September 1, 2010 | iOS 5.1.1 | September 19, 2012 | 3 years |
| iPod Touch (4th) | September 1, 2010 | iOS 4.1 | September 1, 2010 | May 30, 2013 | iOS 6.1.6 | February 21, 2014 | 3 years, 5 months |
| iPod Touch (5th) | September 12, 2012 | iOS 6.0 | October 11, 2012; May 30, 2013 (16 GB; Mid 2013) | July 15, 2015; June 26, 2014 (16 GB; Mid 2013) | iOS 9.3.5 | September 13, 2016 | 3 years, 11 months 3 years, 3 months (16 GB; Mid 2013) |
| iPod Touch (6th) | July 15, 2015 | iOS 8.4 | July 15, 2015 | May 28, 2019 | iOS 12.5.8 | January 26, 2026 | 10 years, 6 months |
| iPod Touch (7th) | May 28, 2019 | iOS 12.3 | May 28, 2019 | May 10, 2022 | iOS 15.8.8 | May 11, 2026 | 6 years, 11 months |

| Model | | iPod Touch (7th) | iPod Touch (6th) | iPod Touch (5th) 16 GB, Mid 2013 | iPod Touch (5th) | iPod Touch (4th) | iPod Touch (3rd) | iPod Touch (2nd) | iPod Touch (1st) |
|---|---|---|---|---|---|---|---|---|---|
| Picture | | | | | | | | | |
| Initial release operating system | | iOS 12.3 | iOS 8.4 | iOS 6.1.3 | iOS 6.0 | iOS 4.1 (Black model) iOS 5.0 (White model) | iPhone OS 3.1.1 | iPhone OS 2.1.1 | iPhone OS 1.1 |
| Latest release operating system | | iOS 15.8.8 | iOS 12.5.8 | iOS 9.3.5 | | iOS 6.1.6 iOS 7.0 (unofficial) | iOS 5.1.1 | iOS 4.2.1 | iPhone OS 3.1.3 |
| Display | Screen Size | 4 in (100 mm) (diagonal); 3.5 by 1.9 in (89 by 48 mm) | | | | 3.5 in (89 mm) (diagonal); 2.9 by 1.9 in (74 by 48 mm) | | | |
| Display | Backlight | LED-backlit | | | | | | | |
| Display | Multi-touch | Yes | | | | | | | |
| Display | Technology | Retina display widescreen with IPS technology | | | | Retina display widescreen with TN technology | Widescreen with TN technology | | |
| Display | Resolution | 1136 × 640 | | | | 960 × 640 | 480 × 320 | | |
| Display | Pixel Density (ppi) | 326 | | | | | 163 | | |
| Display | Aspect Ratio | 71:40 (~16:9) | | | | 3:2 | | | |
| Display | Typical Max brightness ( cd/m^{2}) | 500 | | | | | ? | | |
| Display | Contrast ratio (typical) | 800:1 | | | | | 200:1 | | |
| Display | Fingerprint-resistant oleophobic coating | Yes | | | | | No | | |
| Display | Full sRGB Display | Yes | | | | No | | | |
| Display | Night Shift | Yes | | No | | | | | |
| Display | Taptic | —N/a | | | | | | | |
| Processor | Chip | Apple A10 Fusion | Apple A8 | Apple A5 | | Apple A4 | Samsung S5L8922 | Samsung S5L8720 | Samsung S5L8900 |
| Processor | Technology Node | 16 nm | 20 nm | 32 nm | | 45 nm | | 65 nm | 90 nm |
| Processor | Total Cores | 4 | 2 | | | 1 | | | |
| Processor | High-Performance Cores | 2 × Hurricane | 2 × Typhoon | 2 × Cortex-A9 | | 1 × Cortex-A8 | | 1 × ARM 11 | |
| Processor | Energy-Efficiency Cores | 2 × Zephyr | —N/a | | | | | | |
| Processor | Clock Speed | 2.36 GHz (Underclocked to 1.64 GHz) | 1.4 GHz (Underclocked to 1.1 GHz) | 1 GHz (Underclocked to 800 MHz) | | | 833 MHz (Underclocked to 600 MHz) | 620 MHz (Underclocked to 533 MHz) | 620 MHz (Underclocked to 420 MHz) |
| Processor | Bit | 64-bit | | 32-bit | | | | | |
| Processor | Motion Coprocessor | Embedded in SoC | M8 | —N/a | | | | | |
| Processor | Bus width | 64-bit | | | | | 32-bit | | 16-bit |
| Processor | Graphics Processor | PowerVR GT7600 Plus (6-core) | PowerVR GX6450 (4-core) | PowerVR SGX543MP2 | | PowerVR SGX535 | | PowerVR MBX Lite 3D | |
| Storage | | 32 GB, 128 GB, 256 GB | 16 GB, 32 GB, 64 GB, 128 GB | 16 GB | 16 GB, 32 GB, 64 GB | 8 GB, 16 GB, 32 GB, 64 GB | 32 GB, 64 GB | 8 GB, 16 GB, 32 GB | |
| Storage Type | | NAND Flash driven by NVMe-based controller that communicates over a PCIe connection | NAND Flash (eMMC) | | | | | | |
| RAM | | 2 GB | 1 GB | 512 MB | | 256 MB | | 128 MB | |
| RAM Type | | LPDDR4 1600 MHz (25.6 GB/s) | LPDDR3 800 MHz (12.8 GB/s) | LPDDR2 400 MHz (6.4 GB/s) | | LPDDR2 200 MHz (3.2 GB/s) | LPDDR2 200 MHz (1.6 GB/s) | LPDDR 133 MHz (1066 MB/s) | LPDDR 133 MHz (533 MB/s) |
| Connector | | 8-pin Lightning connector | | | | 30-pin connector | | | |
| Connectivity | Wi-Fi (802.11) | Wi-Fi (802.11a/b/g/n/ac) | | Wi-Fi (802.11a/b/g/n); 802.11n in both 2.4 GHz and 5 GHz | | Wi-Fi (802.11b/g/n); 802.11n in 2.4 GHz only | | Wi-Fi (802.11b/g) | |
| Connectivity | MIMO | No | | | | | | | |
| Connectivity | Bluetooth | Bluetooth 4.1 | | Bluetooth 4.0 | | Bluetooth 2.1 | | | —N/a |
| Sensors | Three-axis gyro | Yes | | | | | No | | |
| Sensors | Accelerometer | Yes | | | | | | | |
| Rear Camera | Camera | 8 MP | | —N/a | 5 MP | 0.7 MP | —N/a | | |
| Rear Camera | Aperture | f/2.4 | | —N/a | f/2.4 | ? | —N/a | | |
| Rear Camera | Auto Image Stabilization | Yes | | —N/a | Yes | No | —N/a | | |
| Rear Camera | Element Lens | Five-element lens | | —N/a | Five-element lens | ? | —N/a | | |
| Rear Camera | Optical Zoom | 1× | | —N/a | 1× | | —N/a | | |
| Rear Camera | Digital Zoom | 5× | | —N/a | 5× | ? | —N/a | | |
| Rear Camera | Autofocus | Yes | | —N/a | Yes | No | —N/a | | |
| Rear Camera | Panorama | Up to 43 MP | | —N/a | Supported | —N/a | | | |
| Rear Camera | Burst Mode | Yes | | —N/a | No | —N/a | | | |
| Rear Camera | Flash | LED flash | | —N/a | LED flash | —N/a | | | |
| Rear Camera | Live Photos | No | | —N/a | No | —N/a | | | |
| Rear Camera | HDR for photos | Yes | | —N/a | Yes | —N/a | | | |
| Rear Camera | Video Recording | 1080p HD at 25 fps, 30 fps or 60 fps | 1080p HD at 30 fps | —N/a | 1080p HD at 30 fps | 720p HD at 30 fps | —N/a | | |
| Rear Camera | Optical Video Zoom | 1× | | —N/a | 1× | | —N/a | | |
| Rear Camera | Digital Video Zoom | 3× | | —N/a | 3× | | —N/a | | |
| Rear Camera | Slow-motion video | 720p at 120 fps | | —N/a | | | | | |
| Rear Camera | Time-lapse video with stabilization | Without stabilization | | —N/a | No | | —N/a | | |
| Front Camera | Camera | 1.2 MP FaceTime HD | | | | 0.3 MP | —N/a | | |
| Front Camera | Aperture | f/2.4 | | f/2.2 | | ? | —N/a | | |
| Front Camera | Live Photos | No | | | | | —N/a | | |
| Front Camera | Retina Flash | No | | | | | —N/a | | |
| Front Camera | Video Recording | 720p at 30 fps | | | | 480p at 30 fps | —N/a | | |
| Front Camera | Slow-motion video | No | | | | | —N/a | | |
| Front Camera | HDR for photos | No | | | | | —N/a | | |
| Front Camera | Auto Image Stabilization | No | | | | | —N/a | | |
| Front Camera | FaceTime | Yes | | | | | —N/a | | |
| Audio | Playback | Mono | | | | | | | No |
| Audio | Dolby Atmos | No | | | | | | | |
| Audio | 3.5 mm Jack | Yes | | | | | | | |
| Compatible with Made for iPhone Hearing Aids | | Yes | | | | No | | | |
| Live Listen | | Yes | | | | No | | | |
| Materials | Front | Space Gray: Black glass front Silver, Gold, Pink, Blue, (PRODUCT)RED: White glass front | | Black glass front | Space Gray: Black glass front Silver, Yellow, Blue, Pink, (PRODUCT)RED: White glass front | Black: Black glass front White: White glass front | All models have black glass front | | |
| Materials | Back | Anodized contoured aluminum back | | | | All models have contoured stainless steel back | | | |
| Materials | Side | Anodized contoured aluminum side | | | | All models have contoured stainless steel side | | | |
| Colors | | | | | | | | | |
| Power | | 3.83 V 3.99 W·h (1,043 mA·h) | | 3.7 V 3.8 W·h (1,030 mA·h) | | 3.7 V 3.44 W·h (930 mA·h) | 3.7 V 2.92 W·h (789 mA·h) | 3.7 V 2.73 W·h (739 mA·h) | 3.7 V 2.15 W·h (580 mA·h) |
| Dimensions | Height | 123.4 mm (4.86 in) | | | | 110 mm (4.3 in) | | | |
| Dimensions | Width | 58.6 mm (2.31 in) | | | | 58 mm (2.3 in) | 61.8 mm (2.43 in) | | |
| Dimensions | Depth | 6.1 mm (0.24 in) | | | | 7.1 mm (0.28 in) | 8.5 mm (0.33 in) | | 8 mm (0.31 in) |
| Weight | | 88 g (3.1 oz) | | 86 g (3.0 oz) | 88 g (3.1 oz) | 101 g (3.6 oz) | 115 g (4.1 oz) | | 120 g (4.2 oz) |
| Total greenhouse gas emissions | | 32 kg CO_{2}e | 70 kg CO_{2}e | 45 kg CO_{2}e | 60 kg CO_{2}e | 50 kg CO_{2}e | 33 kg CO_{2}e | 30 kg CO_{2}e | —N/a |
| Hardware strings | | iPod9,1 | iPod7,1 | iPod5,1 | | iPod4,1 | iPod3,1 | iPod2,1 | iPod1,1 |
| Model number | | A2178 | A1574 | A1509 | A1421 | A1367 | A1318 | A1288; A1319 | A1213 |
| Announced Date | | May 28, 2019 | July 15, 2015 | May 30, 2013 | September 12, 2012 | September 1, 2010 | September 9, 2009 | September 9, 2008 | September 5, 2007 |
| Released Date | | May 28, 2019 | July 15, 2015 | May 30, 2013 | 32 and 64 GB: October 11, 2012; 16 GB: June 26, 2014 | Black (8 GB, 32 GB, and 64 GB): September 1, 2010; White (8 GB, 32 GB, and 64 GB): October 12, 2011; Black and white (16 GB): September 12, 2012 | September 9, 2009 | A1288: September 9, 2008; A1319 8 GB: September 9, 2009 | 8 GB and 16 GB: September 5, 2007; 32 GB: February 27, 2008 |
| Discontinued Date | | May 10, 2022 | 16 GB and 64 GB: July 27, 2017; 32 GB and 128 GB: May 28, 2019 | June 26, 2014 | July 15, 2015 | 8 GB and 64 GB: September 12, 2012; 16 GB and 32 GB: May 30, 2013 | September 1, 2010 | A1288: September 9, 2009; A1319 8 GB: September 1, 2010 | September 9, 2008 |
| Unsupported Date | | May 11, 2026 | January 26, 2026 | September 13, 2016 | | February 21, 2014 | September 19, 2012 | March 9, 2011 | June 21, 2010 |

=== Supported OS releases ===
Supported iOS versions on the iPod Touch
| Model | iPhone OS | | | iOS | | | | | | | | | | | |
| Model | 1 | 2 | 3 | 4 | 5 | 6 | 7 | 8 | 9 | 10 | 11 | 12 | 13 | 14 | 15 |
|---|---|---|---|---|---|---|---|---|---|---|---|---|---|---|---|
| iPod Touch (1st) | 1.1 | Yes | Yes | No | No | No | No | No | No | No | No | No | No | No | No |
| iPod Touch (2nd) | —N/a | 2.1.1 | Yes | 4.2.1 | No | No | No | No | No | No | No | No | No | No | No |
| iPod Touch (3rd) | —N/a | | 3.1.1 | Yes | Yes | No | No | No | No | No | No | No | No | No | No |
| iPod Touch (4th) | —N/a | | | 4.1 | Yes | Yes | No | No | No | No | No | No | No | No | No |
| iPod Touch (5th) | —N/a | | | | | Yes | Yes | Yes | Yes | No | No | No | No | No | No |
| iPod Touch (6th) | —N/a | | | | | | | 8.4 | Yes | Yes | Yes | Yes | No | No | No |
| iPod Touch (7th) | —N/a | | | | | | | | | | | 12.3 | Yes | Yes | Yes |

=== Timeline of iPod touch models ===
Sources: Apple press release library, Mactracker Apple Inc. model database

== Reception ==
Upon launch in 2007, the first generation iPod Touch received mostly good reviews for its display, its full Web browser, and YouTube support. However, it was also criticized for being a "stripped down" iPhone, lacking external volume buttons on its initial models, and having a lower-quality display.

Notable competing products as of 2009 included Creative's ZEN X-Fi2, Sony's Walkman X Series, Microsoft's Zune HD, and as of 2011, the Samsung Galaxy Player and Sony Walkman Z Series.

Later models received a more lukewarm reception, with reviewers questioning whether an iPod Touch made sense as a product in a time when smartphones had become more affordable.

== Discontinuation ==
In May 2022, Apple announced that after over 20 years, the iPod Touch, and the iPod line as a whole, were to be discontinued; the iPod Touch would remain available only while supplies last.

== See also ==
- List of iPhone models
