= JailbreakMe =

Series of iOS jailbreaks

- JailbreakMe 2.0
- Developers: 2.0–3.0: comex, Grant Paul (chpwn), Jay Freeman (saurik), MuscleNerd, et al.; 4.0: tihmstar; TotallyNotSpyware: JakeBlair420 team
- Stable release: TotallyNotSpyware / September 7, 2018; 7 years ago
- Operating system: iOS
- Type: iOS jailbreaking
- License: Freeware
- Website: jailbreakme.com

JailbreakMe is a series of jailbreaks for Apple's iOS mobile operating system that took advantage of flaws in the Safari browser on the device, providing an immediate one-step jailbreak, unlike more common jailbreaks, such as Blackra1n and redsn0w, that require plugging the device into a computer and running the jailbreaking software from the desktop. JailbreakMe included Cydia, a package management interface that serves as an alternative to the App Store. Although it does not support modern devices, the websites remain available for compatible devices.

JailbreakMe's first version in 2007 worked on iPhone and iPod Touch firmware 1.1.1, the second version was released in August 2010 for firmware 4.0.1 and earlier, and the third and final version was released in July 2011 for iOS versions 4.3 to 4.3.3 (and was the first jailbreak for the iPad 2). JailbreakMe 3.0 has been used to jailbreak at least two million devices.

== Versions ==
=== JailbreakMe 1.0 (iOS 1.1.1) ===
JailbreakMe, released on October 28, 2007, was originally used to jailbreak the iPhone and iPod Touch running the 1.1.1 version of iOS, then named iPhone OS. Using a TIFF exploit against Safari, it installed Installer.app. The vulnerability used in this exploit was patched by Apple in the 1.1.2 firmware.

This tool, also called "AppSnapp", was created by a group of nine developers, and hosted by Conceited Software. The team estimated that 100,000 devices were jailbroken in the first three days of its release, growing past 1 million in the first month.

=== JailbreakMe 2.0 (iOS 3.1.2–4.0.1) ===
JailbreakMe 2.0 "Star", released by comex on August 1, 2010, exploited a vulnerability in the FreeType library used while rendering PDF files. This was the first publicly available jailbreak for the iPhone 4, able to jailbreak iOS 3.1.2 through 4.0.1 on the iPhone, iPod Touch, and iPad models then current. This jailbreak was activated by visiting the jailbreakme.com web page on the device's Safari web browser.

The vulnerability used by JailbreakMe 2.0 was patched by Apple in iOS 4.0.2 for iPhone and iPod Touch, and iOS 3.2.2 for iPad.

=== JailbreakMe 3.0 (iOS 4.3–4.3.3) ===
JailbreakMe 3.0 "Saffron", released on July 6, 2011, will jailbreak most iOS devices on iOS 4.3-4.3.3 and iPad 2 on 4.3.3. It was the first publicly available jailbreak for iPad 2. JailbreakMe 3.0 exploited a FreeType parser security flaw (similar to JailbreakMe 2.0), using the form of a PDF file rendered by Mobile Safari, which then used a kernel vulnerability to complete the untethered jailbreak. Comex also released a patch for this FreeType flaw, named PDF Patcher 2, which is available as a free package installable via Cydia.

A few days before the initial release, a beta tester leaked JailbreakMe 3.0 to the public. Comex said on Twitter that this put him on a "time limit" to release the final version quickly.

The JailbreakMe website looked similar to downloading an App Store app. It included a blue button indicating "FREE", which changed into a green "INSTALL" button when pressed once, much like an application on the App Store. After tapping "INSTALL", Safari would close, Cydia would load as a new app, and the device would be jailbroken with no reboot necessary.

On July 15, 2011, Apple released iOS 4.3.4 (GSM) and 4.2.9 (CDMA) to patch the flaws used by JailbreakMe.

Comex received a Pwnie Award at the Black Hat Conference in 2011 for "Best Client-Side Bug" for this work.

Comex was hired by Apple as an intern in August 2011.

=== JailbreakMe 4.0 (iOS 9.1–9.3.4) ===
JailbreakMe 4.0, released by tihmstar on December 12, 2017, exploited three serious vulnerabilities (CVE-2016-4655, CVE-2016-4656 and CVE-2016-4657), already utilized by the spyware Pegasus. It was mainly based on HomeDepot, a semi-untethered jailbreak released by jk9357. HomeDepot targeted all 32-bit devices between iOS 9.1 and iOS 9.3.4.

The vulnerabilities used by HomeDepot and JailbreakMe 4.0 were patched by Apple in iOS 9.3.5.

The jailbreak was hosted by Corellium founder Chris Wade at jailbreak.me. Whilst technically semi-untethered, the jailbreak could be made fully untethered with the use of tihmstar's UntetherHomeDepot package.

=== TotallyNotSpyware (iOS 10) ===
TotallyNotSpyware, created by the JakeBlair420 team, released on September 7, 2018, is a JailbreakMe-style exploit that works on any 64-bit device running between iOS 10 to 10.3.3. As with JailbreakMe 4.0, the web browser is induced to sideload Cydia using a payload, either Meridian or doubleH3lix. It is hosted at totally-not.spyware.lol, and is semi-untethered.

== Domain name transfer ==
On October 7, 2011, Conceited Apps, which had been allowing Comex to use the domain name for hosting, sold the domain name jailbreakme.com to an allegedly "unknown" party. SaurikIT acquired the domain the next day.

=== Domain redirection ===
jailbreakme.com would redirect to cydia.saurik.com if an incompatible device was detected.

Later, it redirects to totally-not.spyware.lol

== Compatible iOS versions ==
Device	iOS versions vulnerable to JailbreakMe
iPhone (1st generation)	1.1.1, 3.1.2 to 3.1.3
iPhone 3G	3.1.2 to 4.0.1
iPhone 3GS	3.1.2 to 4.0.1, 4.3 to 4.3.3
iPhone 4 (GSM)	4.0 to 4.0.1, 4.3 to 4.3.3
iPhone 4 (CDMA)	4.2.6 to 4.2.8
iPhone 4S and later	9.1 to 9.3.4
iPod Touch (1st generation)	1.1.1, 3.1.2 to 3.1.3
iPod Touch (2nd generation)	3.1.2 to 4.0.1
iPod Touch (3rd generation)	3.1.2 to 4.0.1, 4.3 to 4.3.3
iPod Touch (4th generation)	4.3 to 4.3.3
iPod Touch (5th generation) and later	9.1 to 9.3.4
iPad (1st generation)	3.2 to 3.2.1, 4.3 to 4.3.3
iPad 2	4.3.3
iPad (3rd generation) and later	9.1 to 9.3.4
iPad Mini (all models)	9.1 to 9.3.4, 10.0 to 10.3.3
