= Jailbreak (computer science) =

Removing vendor-installed limitations in tech products

In computer security, jailbreaking is defined as the act of removing limitations that a vendor attempted to hard-code or hard-wire into its hardware and/or software. It is a form of privilege escalation. The term may have originated with the use of toolsets to break out of a chroot or jail in UNIX-like operating systems. This allowed the user to see files outside of the file system that the administrator intended to make available to the application or user in question. The term was first used in its modern meaning in the iPhone/iOS jailbreaking community and has also been used as a term for PlayStation Portable hacking; these devices have repeatedly been subject to jailbreaks, allowing the execution of arbitrary code, and sometimes have had those jailbreaks disabled by vendor updates, especially in the case of iOS devices.

== iOS jailbreaking ==
iOS systems including the iPhone, iPad, and iPod Touch have been subject to iOS jailbreaking efforts since they were released, and continuing with each firmware update. iOS jailbreaking tools have included the option to install package frontends such as Cydia and Installer.app, third-party alternatives to the App Store, as a way to find and install system tweaks and binaries. To prevent iOS jailbreaking, Apple has made the device boot ROM execute checks for SHSH blobs in order to disallow uploads of custom kernels and prevent software downgrades to earlier, jailbreakable firmware. In an "untethered" jailbreak, the iBoot environment is changed to execute a boot ROM exploit and allow submission of a patched low level bootloader or hack the kernel to submit the jailbroken kernel after the SHSH check.

== Other phones ==
A similar method of jailbreaking exists for S60 Platform smartphones, where utilities such as HelloOX allow the execution of unsigned code and full access to system files. or edited firmware (similar to the M33 hacked firmware used for the PlayStation Portable) to circumvent restrictions on unsigned code. Nokia has since issued updates to curb unauthorized jailbreaking, in a manner similar to Apple. Rooting is the equivalent concept for Android phones and other devices.

== Console jailbreaking ==
In the case of gaming consoles, jailbreaking is often used to execute homebrew games. In 2011, Sony, with assistance from law firm Kilpatrick Stockton, sued 21-year-old George Hotz and associates of the group fail0verflow for jailbreaking the PlayStation 3 (see Sony Computer Entertainment America v. George Hotz and PlayStation Jailbreak).

== AI jailbreaks ==
Jailbreaking can also occur in systems and software that use generative AI models, such as ChatGPT. In jailbreaking attacks on artificial intelligence systems, users are able to manipulate the system to behave differently than it was intended, making it possible to reveal information about how the model was instructed by the vendor (the "system prompt") or to induce it to respond in an anomalous or harmful way.

These attacks typically simply require prompting the AIs with specific phrasal templates – no software is typically required, although software could theoretically be used to "industrialise" such exploits, and some research has been done in this direction. In 2024, a consortium of AI firms founded HackAPrompt.com, a competition to encourage users to find new and effective AI jailbreaking techniques. These and other findings from "ethical hackers" have been used by AI model providers to try to improve AI safety.

== See also ==
- Prompt injection – a technique where third parties leave instructions for AIs in text that may be fed to an AI, seeking to manipulate its behaviour and potentially derive unauthorised access to information and/or capabilities
