= Icy (application) =

- Original author(s): Ripdev
- Developer(s): Infini-Dev, WeAmDev
- Operating system: iOS
- Type: Package manager
- License: MIT License

Icy is a discontinued package manager for jailbroken iPhone and iPod Touch, originally created and maintained by Ripdev, which allows users to browse and download mobile apps from a range of sources. Most apps were available to download free of charge, with some requiring purchase after downloading, including other software created by Ripdev, such as Kate. Apps are downloaded directly to iPhone or iPod Touch and are generally located in the /Applications/ directory, in the same place where "Apple native" apps are located.

The Icy Project was closed on October 24, 2009, and the source code was released under the MIT License. Icy Installer was then taken over by two development teams, WeAmDev and Infini-Dev.

== History ==
Icy was intended as an alternative to Cydia as a source of unofficial apps, since development on Installer.app (created by Nullriver) was discontinued. The purpose of developing Icy was to create a package manager that used APT which is the same method used by Cydia, therefore making Icy compatible with Cydia sources, that was faster and more lightweight than Cydia.

The Icy Project was closed on October 24, 2009, and the source code was released under the MIT License. The Icy Project was picked up by WeAmDev. The latest version is the beta 2.3, which has support for iOS 7. A group called Infini Dev, has also taken up the project of reviving Icy. They have created this version from RipDev's source code and called their Icy version 1.5.1. Icy 1.4.7 added support to the iPad. The development member is Sammy Guichelaar.

Icy development has been halted in early 2014. It does not support iOS 9. Infini-Dev dropped Icy Support in order to support Installer X, a package manager for legacy devices.
