= Safe mode =

Computer operating system diagnostic mode

Safe mode is a diagnostic mode of a computer operating system (OS). It can also refer to a mode of operation by application software. Safe mode is intended to help fix most, if not all, problems within an operating system. It is also widely used for removing rogue security software.

== Background ==
Microsoft Windows, macOS, Android and Linux distributions such as Ubuntu and Linux Mint are examples of contemporary operating systems that implement a safe mode, as do other complex electronic devices.

In safe mode, an operating system has reduced functionality, but isolating problems is easier because many non-core components, such as sound, are disabled. An installation that will only boot into safe mode typically has a major problem, such as disk corruption or the installation of poorly configured software that prevents the operating system from successfully booting into its normal mode.

Though it varies by operating system, safe mode typically loads only essential executable modules and disables devices except for those necessary to display information and accept input. It can also take the form of a parallel "miniature" operating system that has no configuration information shared with the normal operating system. For example, on Microsoft Windows, the user can also choose to boot to the Recovery Console, a small text-based troubleshooting mode kept separate from the main operating system (which can also be accessed by booting the install CD) or to various "safe mode" options that run the dysfunctional OS but with features, such as video drivers, audio, and networking, disabled.

Safe mode typically provides access to utility and diagnostic programs, allowing a user to troubleshoot what is preventing the operating system from working normally. Safe mode is intended for maintenance, not functionality, and it provides minimal access to features.

== Operating systems ==
=== Windows ===
Windows 11 running in safe mode

Microsoft Windows' safe mode (for 7/Vista /XP /2000/ME/98/95) is accessed by pressing the F8 key as the operating system boots. Also, in a multi-boot environment with multiple versions of Windows installed side by side, the F8 key can be pressed at the OS selector prompt to get to safe mode. However, under Windows 8 (released in 2012), the traditional press-F8-for-safe-mode-options UI convention no longer works, and either Shift-F8 or a special GUI-based workaround is necessary.

=== Unix ===
An equivalently minimal setting in Unix-like operating systems is single-user mode, in which daemons and the X Window System are not started, and only the root user can log in. It can perform emergency repairs or maintenance, including resetting users' passwords on the machine without requiring the old one.

=== macOS ===
In addition to single-user mode, macOS also supports safe mode; holding the shift key after powering up activates Safe Boot, which has background maintenance features. Besides selecting the mode, it runs a file system repair, disables all fonts other than those in /System/Library/Fonts, moves all font caches to the Trash, and disables all startup items and any login items. Unlike in Windows, where safe mode with networking is disabled by default and requires using a safe mode with networking enabled, in macOS, Safe Boot always includes networking.

On Classic Mac OS versions 6, 7, 8, and 9, a mode similar to Safe Mode is achieved by holding down the shift key while booting, which starts the system without extensions.

=== iOS ===
iOS does not have a safe mode. However, some jailbreaks add a safe mode where all tweaks are disabled, the wallpaper is black, and a notification will tell one that they are in safe mode. In that mode, some apps may not launch.

=== Android ===
The way safe mode is activated on Android varies by vendor. Safe mode can be disabled by rebooting the device. To boot into safe mode on Android is done by long pressing the power button and selecting the safe mode option from the menu, or by long pressing the power button together with the volume down button.

== Application software ==
Application software sometimes offers a safe mode as well. In the PHP interpreter, prior to version 5.4, safe mode offers stricter security measures. The Glasgow Haskell Compiler from version 7.2 offers "Safe Haskell" mode, restricting usage of functions such as unsafePerformIO. Mozilla Firefox's safe mode allows the user to remove extensions, which may be preventing the browser from loading. Internet Explorer can run in "No Add-Ons" mode and Protected Mode. Cydia's Mobile Substrate also has a safe mode that allows users to uninstall tweaks and extensions that may crash the Springboard. Minecraft has a safe mode that activates if a player attempts to open a world with an invalid data pack, allowing the world to be loaded using only the vanilla data pack.

== See also ==
- BOOT.INI
- Bcdedit
- MSConfig
