= Absinthe (disambiguation) =

Absinthe is a distilled alcoholic beverage.

Absinthe may also refer to:

== Music ==
- Absinthe (Marc Almond album) (1993), by Marc Almond
- Absinthe (Naked City album) (1993), by Naked City
- "Absinthe" (song), by I Dont Know How But They Found Me
- Absinthe: La Folie Verte (2001), by Blood Axis and Les Joyaux De La Princesse
- "Absinthe", a 2022 song by Jean-Michel Blais from Aubades

== Other uses ==
- L'Absinthe, a 1876 painting by Edgar Degas
- Absinthe (1913 film), an American silent film starring Glen White
- Absinthe (1914 film), an American silent film starring King Baggot
- Absinthe (show), an American circus performance which premiered 2006
- Absinthe (software), a tool to untethered jailbreak the iPhone 4S and iPad 2
- Absinthe (stallion), a Soviet dressage horse

== See also ==
- AbsInt
- Absinthiana
- Absynthe (disambiguation)
