= David Wang (hacker) =

Mobile phone hacker

- Other name: planetbeing

David Wang (also known as planetbeing) is a mobile phone hacker.

In 2007, as part of the early iOS jailbreaking community, he developed instructions for how to jailbreak an iPhone while using Windows, along with contributing to the initial version of JailbreakMe. In 2010, Wang modified iPhone software to enable using the Android operating system on the phone. He worked on iOS jailbreaks as part of the iPhone Dev Team and the Evad3rs team, and he won a Pwnie Award for his jailbreaking work with the Evad3rs. Their work included Evasi0n. He also wrote an open source tool, xpwn, that was cited in books about iPhone hacking.

While working for Azimuth Security, Wang worked on a project for the FBI where he helped unlock an iPhone that belonged to an attacker who was part of the 2015 San Bernardino attack. That situation was part of the Apple–FBI encryption dispute.

In 2016, Wang and collaborators gave a talk at the Black Hat conference with technical details about the iPhone's Secure Enclave Processor.

Wang cofounded Corellium, a company that provides virtualization services for companies to test phone software. Corellium offered or sold the product to at least some companies that make spyware. While at Corellium, Wang worked on an experimental tool to run Android on iPhones in 2020. Apple sued Corellium in 2019, including accusations that the company sold the product to governments that wanted to use it to find ways to break into iPhones, but the companies settled in 2023.

Wang also cofounded Quantum Metric, a data analytics company.
