= Evasi0n =

evasi0n
- evasi0n 1.5.1 on OS X
- Developer(s): Evad3rs (pod2g, MuscleNerd, planetbeing, pimskeks)
- Stable release: 1.5.3
- Operating system: Microsoft Windows, macOS and Linux
- Website: evasi0n.com/iOS6 (archived)

evasi0n7
- Developer(s): Evad3rs (pod2g, MuscleNerd, planetbeing, pimskeks)
- Stable release: 1.0.8
- Operating system: Microsoft Windows, and macOS
- Website: evasi0n.com (archived)

evasi0n is a jailbreak program for iOS 6.0-6.1.2, released on 4 February 2013, made by the evad3rs team. An updated version for iOS 7.0-7.0.6, evasi0n7, was released on 22 December 2013. More than seven million copies of evasi0n were downloaded in the first four days after release. It is known for a portable code base and minimal use of arbitrary code execution.

== History ==
Four of the six exploits used were patched by Apple on 18 March 2013 with the release of iOS 6.1.3. On 22 December 2013, the evad3rs released a new version of evasi0n that supports iOS 7.x, known as evasi0n7. One major exploit used by this jailbreak was patched by Apple with the 4th beta of iOS 7.1 and two more with beta 5. The final release of iOS 7.1 fixed all the exploits used by evasi0n7.

== Technology ==
The evasi0n jailbreak first remounts the root file system as read-write and then achieves persistence by editing the /etc/launchd.conf file, which launchd consults. Evasi0n then applies patches in the kernel, bypassing address space layout randomization by triggering a data fault and reconstructing the kernel slide by reading the faulting instruction from the appropriate ARM exception vector. It produces an "untethered" jailbreak, which means that the jailbreak continues to work even after rebooting the phone.

PCMag reported that evasi0n checks whether it is running on a Chinese-language computer, and, if so, installs Taiji, a Chinese app market, rather than Cydia.

== See also ==
- p0sixspwn, an userland jailbreak for iOS 6.1.3-6.1.6 developed by iH8sn0w, winocm and SquiffyPwn.
- Cydia, an open-source package manager for iOS which uses APT repositories to get apps and tweaks.
