= Effective power =

Effective power may refer to:

- Active power or real power, a concept in AC power
- A measurement of horsepower
- "effective power" (bug), a bug with the iPhone's SpringBoard app

== See also ==
- Mean effective pressure
