= PP Jailbreak =

- Developer: PP Assistant / PP25
- Initial release: January 19, 2015; 10 years ago
- Stable release: 5.9.6.4146 / October 5, 2018; 7 years ago
- Operating system: iOS 8
- Available in: Chinese
- Website: 25pp.com

PP Jailbreak, also commonly known as PP, PP25 App or PP25 Jailbreak, is a term describing a free Chinese app containing tools capable of jailbreaking iOS 8 devices, except for Apple TV. Eligible products include: iPod Touch, iPhone and iPad. This app was developed by a Chinese iOS hacking community known as PP Assistant. It was first released on January 19, 2015

== Features ==
The tools in the PP Jailbreak application help users bypass device restrictions in order to obtain root access to the operating system. Users are then able to install applications and customizations not typically available through the App Store for iOS.

PP Jailbreak is only available in Chinese and is notable as the only application able to jailbreak iOS 8.4 on Mac or iOS 8.4 on Windows.

PP Jailbreak gives users access to software that is unavailable on the iOS App Store using Cydia, an iOS application and digital distribution platform. Although PP Jailbreak was initially incompatible with Cydia, it now includes recommended resources for Cydia and other software tools such as OpenSSH.

If an iOS user removes PP Jailbreak from their device, they will have to update their device to the latest iOS version due to firmware updates by Apple. Furthermore, a device loaded with the latest iOS version cannot go back to a previous iOS version. The initial release of the PP Jailbreak tool included support for iOS 9.3, as the team suspected that an imminent firmware update by Apple would fix the vulnerabilities used in the tool.

=== PP Assistant ===
The PP Assistant (also known as M949mm) is the term for the iOS community that developed the jailbreaking tools in PP Jailbreak. It is said to be a fake of the taiG iOS jailbreak.

25PP PC (PP Helper) is a freeware software created to manage all Android and iOS devices (including iOS 12). Using this app you can easily install games, create backups, view all files on the device, automatically clean temp files created by software etc. There is also an option to install apps without using AppStore.

The user interface of the PP Helper app is in the Chinese language. This can be difficult for the most user but, the interface is quite easy to navigate.
