= Greenpois0n =

Series of iOS jailbreaking tools

greenpois0n
- Developer: Chronic Dev Team
- Release: October 12, 2010
- Stable release: RC 6.1 / February 18, 2011
- Operating system: OS X, Microsoft Windows, Linux
- Available in: English
- Type: iOS Jailbreaking
- License: GPL
- Website: greenpois0n.com (archived)

greenpois0n Absinthe
- Developers: Chronic Dev Team and iPhone Dev Team (Jailbreak Dream Team)
- Release: January 20, 2012
- Stable release: 2.0.4 / May 30, 2012
- Operating system: OS X, Microsoft Windows, Linux
- Available in: English
- Type: iOS Jailbreaking
- License: freeware
- Website: greenpois0n.com (archived)

greenpois0n is a name shared by a series of iOS jailbreaking tools developed by Chronic Dev Team (sometimes called the greenpois0n team) that use exploits to remove software restrictions on iPhones, iPads, iPod Touches, and Apple TVs. Greenpois0n's initial release in October 2010 jailbroke iOS 4.1, and its second version in February 2011 jailbroke iOS 4.2.1 as well as iOS 4.2.6 on CDMA iPhones. The second generation of the tool, greenpois0n Absinthe, was developed with iPhone Dev Team members and jailbroke iOS 5.0.1 in January 2012 (providing the first jailbreak of the iPhone 4S), and a second version jailbroke iOS 5.1.1 in May 2012 (providing the first jailbreak of the third generation iPad).

Jailbreaking enables root access to the iOS operating system, allowing the installation of applications and customizations that are unavailable through the official App Store for iOS. Jailbreaking voids the device's warranty, and Apple releases iOS updates to make jailbreaking more difficult.

== greenpois0n for iOS 3/4 ==
On October 12, 2010, Chronic Dev Team released Greenpois0n, a desktop-based tool for jailbreaking iOS 4.1 on iPhone 4, iPhone 3GS, iPod Touch third and fourth generation, and iPhone OS 3.2.2 on the iPad 1. During its development, Apple released the second generation Apple TV, and Greenpois0n's developers reported that it could jailbreak the Apple TV as well. The developers announced plans to release it on October 10, but after news spread of another jailbreak developer, George Hotz, preparing to release a jailbreaking tool called limera1n that would perform a similar function with a different exploit, the Greenpois0n developers delayed in order to integrate the limera1n exploit, which supported more devices. Using limera1n also meant that the original Greenpois0n exploit (SHAtter) could be saved for use in later jailbreaks. Both SHAtter and limera1n are boot ROM exploits, which means they cannot be patched by iOS updates because bootROM code is embedded in iOS devices during manufacturing, and cannot be overwritten at any time.

In February 2011, Chronic Dev Team released a new version of greenpois0n to jailbreak iOS 4.2.1 and to jailbreak iOS 4.2.6 on the iPhone 4 CDMA (Verizon), with desktop-based tools for OS X, Microsoft Windows, and Linux. It provides an "untethered" jailbreak, which means that the jailbroken device can be rebooted into a jailbroken state without computer assistance or user input. It supports iPad, iPhone, iPod Touch, and Apple TV. Chronic Dev Team announced support for the newly released iPhone 4 CDMA before the devices were in stores.

=== Chronic Dev Team ===
As of late 2011, Joshua Hill was described as a "head honcho" of Chronic-Dev Team, and as a principal. Other members, in addition to Hill, in early 2012 included Cyril, and Nikias Bassen.

== Greenpois0n Absinthe for iOS 5 ==
Developers from Chronic Dev Team and iPhone Dev Team released greenpois0n Absinthe (known as just "Absinthe") in January 2012, a desktop-based tool (for OS X, Microsoft Windows, and Linux) to jailbreak the iPhone 4S for the first time and the iPad 2 for the second time, on iOS 5.0.1 for both devices and also iOS 5.0 for iPhone 4S. Absinthe provides an "untethered" jailbreak, which means that the patched device can be rebooted directly into a jailbroken state without computer assistance (or, as with a semi-untethered jailbreak, without requiring an application to be launched on the device following startup, in order to reactivate the jailbreak exploit). It incorporated the untether exploit called Corona that pod2g had released in December for older iOS devices. The Next Web said that the jailbreak took a long time to be released, and VentureBeat said Absinthe wasn't as easy to use as the earlier jailbreaking tool JailbreakMe. According to iPhone Dev Team, approximately one million devices were newly jailbroken in the three days after Absinthe's release. The developers called their joint effort the Jailbreak Dream Team, which Apple credited in its document listing security patches in the subsequent version of iOS.

In May 2012, developers from Chronic Dev Team and iPhone Dev Team released Absinthe 2.0 (for OS X, Windows, and Linux), which can jailbreak iOS 5.1.1 untethered on all iPhone, iPad, and iPod Touch models that support iOS 5.1.1, including jailbreaking the third generation iPad for the first time. They announced it at the Hack In The Box security conference in Amsterdam at the end of a presentation about the earlier Absinthe jailbreak, and it did not initially support a recently released model of iPad 2. According to Chronic Dev Team, approximately one million devices were jailbroken over the weekend after its Friday release. PC World noted that devices jailbroken with tools such as Absinthe 2.0 can be a security concern for companies that have "bring your own device" policies.
