= Blackra1n =

Jailbreaking application for iOS

blackra1n
- Original author: George Hotz
- Developer: George Hotz
- Release: October 11, 2009; 17 years ago
- Stable release: RC3 / November 3, 2009; 16 years ago
- Operating system: Microsoft Windows, Mac OS X
- Type: Jailbreaking
- License: Freeware
- Website: blackra1n.com

blackra1n is a freeware jailbreaking utility developed by American hacker George Hotz for the iPhone and iPod touch. First released for Windows in October 2009, it provided a simplified jailbreak for devices running iPhone OS 3.1.2. A Mac OS X version followed two days later.

The original release only jailbroke the device and did not remove its carrier lock. In November 2009, blackra1n RC3 added Hotz's blacksn0w utility, which could unlock the iPhone 3G and iPhone 3GS when they used baseband version 05.11.07.

== History ==
Hotz released the first Windows version of blackra1n on October 11, 2009, shortly after Apple issued iPhone OS 3.1.2. Contemporary reports described it as compatible with the iPhone and iPod touch models then on sale, although newer iPod touch hardware required a computer-assisted, or tethered, restart. The initial version did not include carrier unlocking or activation bypassing. A Mac OS X port was released on October 13.

Release candidate 2, issued later that month, added reported support for both iPhone OS 3.1 and 3.1.2. It also corrected problems affecting the iPhone 3G and the Icy package manager, and introduced tethered support for devices fitted with newer boot ROMs.

RC3 was released on November 3, 2009. It incorporated blacksn0w, added support for activation without an official carrier SIM, and restored Apple's internet-tethering option on supported devices. The update also added compatibility with Mac OS X Tiger and PowerPC-based Macs.

== Operation ==
Unlike tools that created a modified firmware image for installation through iTunes, blackra1n communicated directly with the device over USB. After completing the jailbreak, it installed a small application through which users could add package managers such as Cydia and Rock, or install blacksn0w on supported iPhones.

The underlying exploit targeted the handling of USB control messages in iBoot, Apple's second-stage bootloader. It ran through recovery mode, which is handled by iBoot, rather than the BootROM-based DFU mode. The exploit redirected an interrupt handler and then patched signature checks in iBoot and the operating-system kernel, allowing unauthorized code to run.

On early iPhone 3GS units, blackra1n could also use the earlier 24kpwn BootROM exploit to break the device's chain of trust from startup. Newer iPhone 3GS and iPod touch models contained a revised boot ROM that was not vulnerable to 24kpwn. On those devices, blackra1n's iBoot exploit had to be run again after every reboot, producing a tethered jailbreak.

== Reception and later developments ==
Technology publications highlighted blackra1n's comparatively simple interface. Wired described the process as easier than the earlier jailbreak methods it had tested, while noting that the program combined jailbreaking, carrier unlocking and internet tethering in a single utility. The application's recovery screen displayed a stylized portrait of Hotz, making the tool visually distinct from other jailbreak utilities of the period.

When Apple released iPhone OS 3.1.3 in February 2010, blackra1n was not compatible with the update at launch. In May, the separately developed Spirit utility provided an untethered jailbreak for activated devices running iPhone OS 3.1.2 and 3.1.3, as well as the first-generation iPad running iPhone OS 3.2.

In April 2010, blackra1n's name was also used to distribute a malicious Windows package. According to The Register, the package bundled the genuine jailbreaking application with a Trojan that changed the computer's DNS settings. The malware affected the Windows PC rather than the connected iPhone.

== See also ==
- History of iOS jailbreaking
- iOS jailbreaking
