= KeyRaider =

Malware for Apple iOS devices

KeyRaider is a computer malware that affects jailbroken Apple iOS devices, specifically iPhones, and allows criminals to steal users' login and password information, as well as to lock the devices and demand a ransom to unlock them. It was discovered by researchers from Palo Alto Networks and WeiPhone in August 2015, and is believed to have led to more than 225,000 people having their login and password information being stolen, making it, according to cybersecurity columnist, Joseph Steinberg, "one of the most damaging pieces of malware ever discovered in the Apple universe." The malware was originally found on a Chinese website, but has spread to 18 countries including the United States. KeyRaider affects only iPhones that have been jailbroken.

== See also ==
- Ransomware
