= Jay Freeman =

American computer scientist

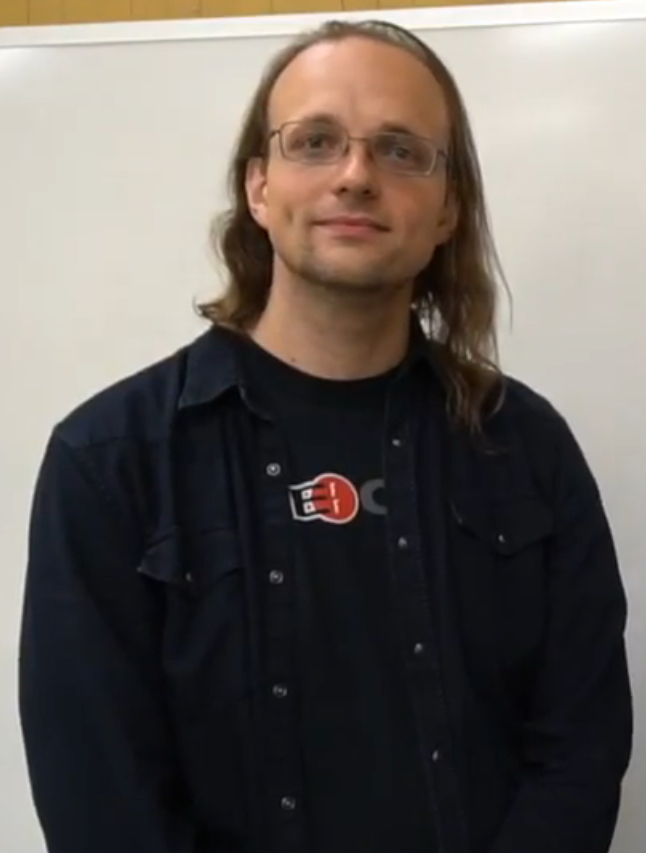
- Freeman in 2018
- Born: November 27, 1981 (age 44); Chicago, Illinois
- Other name: saurik
- Education: College of Creative Studies, University of California, Santa Barbara
- Occupations: Technologist, Entrepreneur
- Employer(s): SaurikIT, LLC
- Known for: Cydia
- Website: www.saurik.com

Jay Ryan Freeman (born November 27, 1981) is an American businessman and software engineer. He is known for creating the Cydia software application and related software for jailbroken iOS—a modified version of Apple's iOS (where OS stands for operating system) that allows for the installation and customization of software outside of the regulation imposed by the App Store system.

== Education and early work ==
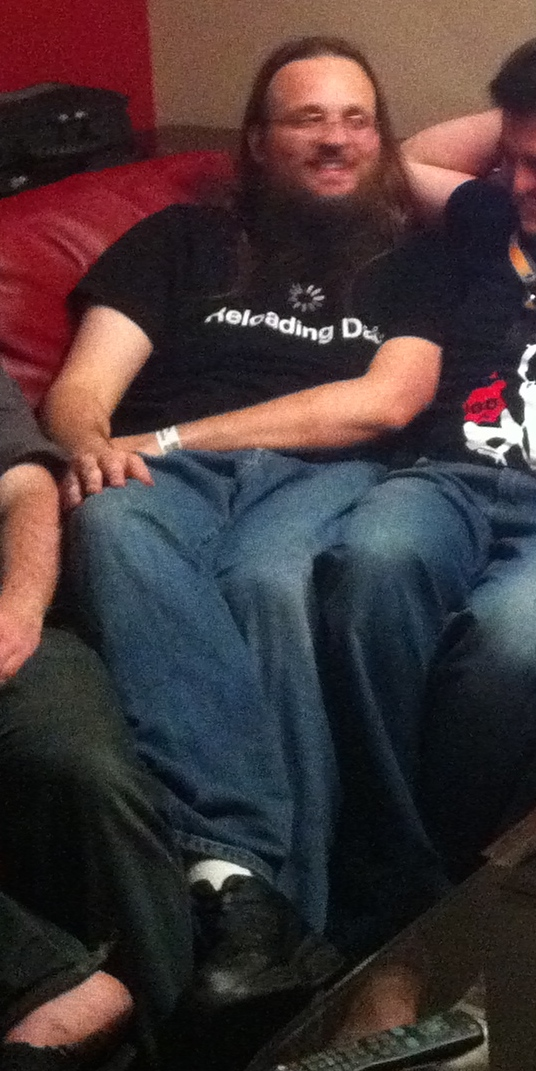
Saurik at Defcon 2011

Freeman studied and graduated with a degree in computer science from the College of Creative Studies at the University of California, Santa Barbara. In 2009, he was a doctoral student in computer science at UCSB.

He built Anakrino, a decompiler for .NET available in 2002. He co-authored a paper published in 2005 about a "Java runtime event specification and monitoring library." He has worked with Brian Fox on multiple freelance projects.

== Software ==
=== iOS ===
In February 2008, Freeman released the initial version of Cydia, a software distribution and installation tool for jailbroken iOS devices. In May 2009, he added a proprietary store system to Cydia which allows developers to sell their products. In September 2010, his company (SaurikIT, LLC) announced that it had acquired Rock Your Phone, Inc. (makers of Rock.app). SaurikIT and Rock Your Phone were the two largest providers of third-party apps.

He has published tools for developers to make software, particularly for jailbroken iOS. He made Cydia Substrate, a framework that developers use to help them modify iOS with extensions. He also made Cycript, a tool that developers use to inspect and modify applications on iOS and OS X.

He has developed a plethora of software extensions for jailbroken iOS users to add features to iOS, including Apple File Conduit 2, Cycorder, CyDialer, Cydget, Cyntact, Cyueue, Five Icon Dock, Veency, and WinterBoard. He has also released Cydia Eraser (previously named Cydia Impactor, but was renamed to avoid confusion) for jailbroken iOS, a tool for removing personal data and "unjailbreaking" the device while preserving the iOS version.

He is also a member of the iPhone Dev Team group, which has developed jailbreaks for iOS.

=== Android ===
Freeman has also done software development and security research on the Android OS. In 2008, he ported Debian for use on an Android phone. In April 2013, he built an implementation of a root (jailbreak) for Google Glass and published an analysis of the ramifications. In May 2013, he published a version of Cydia Substrate for Android. In July 2013, he published an analysis and implementation of "Master Key" vulnerabilities for Android.

== Politics ==
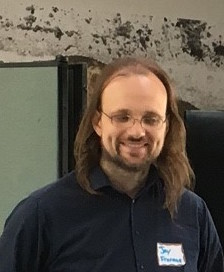
Freeman at an Isla Vista Community Center outreach event in 2016

Freeman supported incorporation of Isla Vista, California (the community adjoining UCSB). In January 2016, he announced his candidacy for the Santa Barbara County Board of Supervisors, and in June 2016 he lost in the primary election for that role. He then ran for a four-year seat on the board of directors for the Isla Vista Community Services District and was elected in November 2016.

Freeman was a Special District member of the Santa Barbara County Local Agency Formation Commission from 2019 until 2022. As of 2019, he was also a member of the Goleta Library Advisory Commission.
