= IOS jailbreaking =

Removal of limitations from iOS devices

iOS jailbreaking is the use of a kernel and/or userland exploit to remove software restrictions imposed by Apple on devices running iOS and iOS-based (Note: Such as tvOS (since the 2nd generation), watchOS or iPadOS.) operating systems.

While legacy jailbreaks modified the system partition, modern 'rootless' jailbreaks (iOS 15+) work around the Sealed System Volume (SSV) to grant root access (UID 0) and sandbox escapes without modifying the read-only root filesystem. This allows for the installation of software and tweaks unavailable through the App Store by localizing them within a writable directory named /private/preboot/$boot-manifest-hash$/procursus, accessed through the /var/jb symlink for quick accessibility.

A jailbroken device typically permits root access within the operating system and provides the right to install software unavailable through the App Store. Different devices and versions are exploited with modern tools like Dopamine or palera1n. Apple views jailbreaking as a violation of the end-user license agreement and strongly cautions device owners not to try to achieve root access through the exploitation of vulnerabilities.

While sometimes compared to rooting an Android device, jailbreaking bypasses several types of Apple prohibitions for the end-user. Since it includes modifying the operating system (enforced by a "locked bootloader"), installing non-officially approved (not available on the App Store) applications via sideloading, and granting the user elevated administration-level privileges (rooting), the concepts of iOS jailbreaking are therefore technically different from Android device rooting.

== Motivation ==
Expanding the feature set that Apple and its App Store have restricted is one of the motivations for jailbreaking. Apple checks apps for compliance with its iOS Developer Program License Agreement before accepting them for distribution in the App Store. However, the reasons for Apple to ban apps are not limited to safety and security and may be regarded as arbitrary and capricious. In one case, Apple mistakenly banned an app by a Pulitzer-Winning cartoonist because it violated its developer license agreement, which specifically bans apps that "contain content that ridicules public figures." To access banned apps, users rely on jailbreaking to circumvent Apple's censorship of content and features. Jailbreaking permits the downloading of programs not approved by Apple, such as user interface customization and tweaks.

=== Device customization ===
Software programs that are available through APT or Installer.app (legacy) are not required to adhere to App Store guidelines. Most of them are not typical self-contained apps, but instead are extensions and customizations for iOS or other apps (commonly called tweaks). Users can install these programs for purposes including personalization and customization of the interface using tweaks developed by developers and designers, adding desired features such as access to the root file system and fixing annoyances, and making development work on the device easier by providing access to the file system and command-line tools. Many Chinese iOS device owners also jailbreak their phones to install third-party Chinese character input systems because they are said to be easier to use than Apple's.

In some cases, features introduced by Apple resemble features earlier introduced as jailbreak features for iOS and iPadOS, though implementations often differ.

Features introduced by Apple that resemble jailbreak tweaks
Apple feature		Jailbreak tweak		
iOS version	Description	Title	Developer	Originally released for
5.0	Emoji support	Vmoji	Vintendo/ManChild Technologies	iOS 4
5.0	Keyboard shortcuts	Xpandr	Nicholas Haunold	iOS 4
5.0	Delete individual calls	Call Delete	IArrays	iOS 4
6.0	Custom songs as alarm sound	PlayAwake	Hanene Samara	iPhone OS 3
7.0	Control Center	SBSettings	BigBoss	iPhone OS 2
7.0	Control Center	NCSettings	JamieD360	iOS 5
7.0	Translucent Notification Center	BlurredNCBackground	Phillippe	iOS 5
8.0	Interactive Notifications	LockInfo	David Ashman	iOS 4
8.0	Interactive Notifications	biteSMS	biteSMS Team	iOS 5
8.0	Third-Party Keyboards	Fleksy Enabler	Sea Comet	iOS 6
8.0	Predictive Text	PredictiveKeyboard	Matthias Sauppe	iOS 6
9.0	Cursor Control	SwipeSelection	Kyle Howells	iOS 4
9.0	Lowercase Keys in Keyboard	ShowCase	Lance Fetters	iOS 4
10.0	Drawing on Messages	Graffiti	IanP	iOS 5
10.0	Floating Notification Center	Floater	Skylerk99	iOS 8
10.0	Bubble Notifications	WatchNotifications	Thomas Finch	iOS 8
10.0	Clear All Notifications	3D Touch to Clear Notifications	MohammadAG	iOS 8
10.0	Clear All Notifications	OneTapClear	Rave	iOS 8
10.0	Stickers in Messages	StickerMe	Alexander Laurus	iOS 8
10.0	Separate Control Center Pages	Auxo	A3Tweaks	iOS 9
11.0	Files app	FinderMobile	Kenneth Ackerson	iPhone OS 1
11.0	Files app	iFile	Carsten Heinelt	iPhone OS 3
11.0	Files app	Fiiza File Manager	TIGI Software	iOS 7
11.0	Cellular Data Control	SBSettings	BigBoss	iPhone OS 2
11.0	Cellular Data Control	CCSettings	plipala	iOS 8
11.0	Customizable Control Center	CChide/CCSettings	plipala	iOS 8
11.0	Customizable Control Center	Onizuka	Maximehip	iOS 8
11.0	Colored Controls	Cream	CP Digital Darkroom	iOS 8
11.0	One-Handed Keyboard (iPhone)	OneHandWizard	TheAfricanNerd, sharedRoutine	iOS 8
11.0	Low Power Mode in Control Center	CCLowPower	Cole Cabral	iOS 10
11.0	Notification design tweaks	CleanNotification10	Ayden Panhuyzen	iOS 10
13.0	Dark Mode	Eclipse	Guillermo Morán	iOS 7
13.0	Dark Mode	Noctis	LaughingQuoll	iOS 7
13.0	Download manager in Safari	Safari Plus	BigBoss	iOS 8
13.0	Redesigned volume HUD	Melior	SparkDev	iOS 7
13.0	Redesigned volume HUD	Ultrasound	Ayden Panhuyzen	iOS 11
13.0	Wi-Fi/Bluetooth settings in Control Center	WeatherVane	ATWiiks	iOS 11
13.0	Unlimited app download limit on Mobile Data	Appstore Unrestrict	iJulioverne	iOS 11
13.0	Third-party Controller Support	nControl	Kevin Bradley	iOS 12
14.0	Hide apps from Home screen	Poof	BigBoss	iOS 5, possibly older
14.0	Compact Call Interface	CallBar	Elias Limneos	iOS 7
14.0	Compact Call Interface	Scorpion	Esquilli	iOS 13
14.0	App Library	Vesta	SparkDev	iOS 13
14.0	Changing CarPlay background	Canvas	Leftyfl1p	iOS 13
14.0	Home Screen Widgets	HSWidgets	dgh0st	iOS 13
14.0	Smaller Siri	SmallSiri	Muirey03	iOS 13
15.0	Inset table design in settings app	iKSettings	iKarwan	iOS 11
15.0	Separation Alerts	Proximitus	LaughingQuoll	iOS 11
15.0	Low Power Mode (iPad)	LPMPad	iCraze	iOS 13
15.0	Focus	PureFocus	Dave Van Wijk	iOS 13
15.0	Notification Priority	Contacy	XCXiao	iOS 13
15.0	Redesigned Notifications	Quart	LaughingQuoll	iOS 13
15.0	Redesigned Notifications	Velvet	NoisyFlake	iOS 13
15.0	Redesigned Notifications	Velvet	HiMyNameIsUbik	iOS 13
16.0	Taptic Keyboard	TapticKeys	SparkDev	iOS 10
16.0	Redesigned Now Playing Interface	Colorflow	David Goldman	iOS 7
16.0	Redesigned Now Playing Interface	Chromaflow	Ryan Nair	iOS 14
16.0	Enhanced Lock Screen customization	Complications	Ben Giannis	iOS 12
17.0	Camera App Composition Features	CameraTweak	Samball	iOS 6
17.0	Crossfade in the Music App	Crossfade	H6nry	iOS 6
17.0	Improved Auto-correct	ManualCorrect Pro	Aaron Lindsay (aerialx)	iOS 7
17.0	Live Voicemail	Super Voicemail	hAcx	iOS 8
17.0	Informative App Store Downloads	App Percent	pxcex	iOS 10
17.0	Change Haptic Menu Speed	Better3DMenus	dpkg_	iOS 11
17.0	Safari Private Browsing Privacy	BioProtect XS	Elias Limneos	iOS 12
17.0	Additional AirPods gestures	Siliqua Pro	LaughingQuoll	iOS 12
17.0	Using Non-System Apps	EvilScheme	Lorenzo	iOS 13
17.0	Interactive Widgets	PowerWidget	Ginsu	iOS 14
17.0	Additional CarPlay Wallpapers	Airaw	Dcsyhi	iOS 14
17.0	Contact Posters	Phoenix	SouthernGirlWhoCode of titand3v	iOS 14
17.0	Verification code auto-deleting	NoMoreShortCodes	Arcas	iOS 14
17.0	Notes App Formatting	Textyle 3	Ryan Nair	iOS 15
17.0	StandBy Mode	Photon	cemck	iOS 13.0
17.0	Change Lock Screen Time Weight	SimpleTime	p2kdev	iOS 12.0
18.0	App icon customization	Winterboard	Jay Freeman (saurik)	iPhone OS 2, possibly older
18.0	Hide app labels	Winterboard	Jay Freeman (saurik)	iPhone OS 2, possibly older
18.0	Remote-control mobile device from computer	Veency	Jay Freeman (saurik)	iPhone OS 2, possibly older
18.0	App locking	Lockdown	ipodtouchmaster05	iPhone OS 3, possibly older
18.0	App locking	BioProtectXS	Elias Limneos	iOS 12
18.0	Unrestricted placement of app icons on grid	Gridlock	chpwn, p0sixninja	iOS 5
18.0	Text message scheduling	Kairos	CP Digital Darkroom	iOS 8
18.0	Text input for Siri	SpotlightSiri	MohammadAG	iOS 8
18.0	Third-party control center toggles	Silo	iOS Creatix	iOS 11
18.0	Third-party control center toggles	CCSupport	Lars Fröder (opa344)	iOS 11
18.0	T9 dialer	EasyDialer	TweakiOS	iOS 11
18.0	Lock Screen quick-action replacement	QuickActions	Cameron Katri	iOS 13
18.0	Floating tabs	FloatyTab	iOSthememOd	iOS 13
18.0	Resizing and rearranging control center modules	BetterCC	miguellamour	iOS 14
18.0	LLM Siri integration	SiriPlus	uckermark	iOS 14
26.0	Animated album art on Lock Screen background	Fullscreen Album Art	bushe	iOS 6
26.0	Animated album art on Lock Screen background	CanvasLite	sugiuta	iOS 13
26.0	Modifiable alarm snooze times	Safe Alarm PRO	Douglas Soares	iOS 7
26.0	Charging ETA	ChargeTime	Sticktron	iOS 10
26.0	CarPlay video playback	CarBridge	leftyfl1p	iOS 10
26.0	Dynamically hide home bar	AutoHideHomebarX	Asterix	iOS 11
26.0	Windowed multitasking on iPad OS	MilkyWay	akusio	iOS 12, possibly older
26.0	Message app backgrounds	ChatUI	CreatureCoding	iOS 13
26.0	AirPods low battery notification	AirPods Case Low Battery	ScenicJaguar101	iOS 13
27.0	Custom EQ (equalizer) for AirPods	EQE	rweichler	iOS 7
27.0	Siri app on homescreen	SiriApp	level3tig	iOS 11

=== Carrier unlocking ===
Jailbreaking also opens the possibility for using software to unofficially unlock carrier-locked iPhones so they can be used with other carriers. Software-based unlocks have been available since September 2007, with each tool applying to a specific iPhone model and baseband version (or multiple models and versions). This includes the iPhone 4S, iPhone 4, iPhone 3GS, and iPhone 3G models. An example of unlocking an iPhone through a Jailbreak utility would be Redsn0w. Through this software, iPhone users will be able to create a custom IPSW and unlock their device. Moreover, during the unlocking process, there are options to install the iPad baseband to the iPhone.

=== Installation of malware ===
Cybercriminals may jailbreak an iPhone to install malware or target jailbroken iPhones on which malware can be installed more easily. The Italian cybersecurity company Hacking Team, which used to sell hacking software to law enforcement agencies, advised police to jailbreak iPhones to allow tracking software to be installed on them.

=== Software piracy ===
On iOS devices, the installation of consumer software is generally restricted to installation through the App Store. Jailbreaking, therefore, allows the installation of pirated applications. It has been suggested that a major motivation for Apple to prevent jailbreaking is to protect the income of its App Store, including third-party developers and allow the buildup of a sustainable market for third-party software. However, the installation of pirated applications is also possible without jailbreaking, taking advantage of enterprise certificates to facilitate the distribution of modified or pirated releases of popular applications.

== Package managers ==
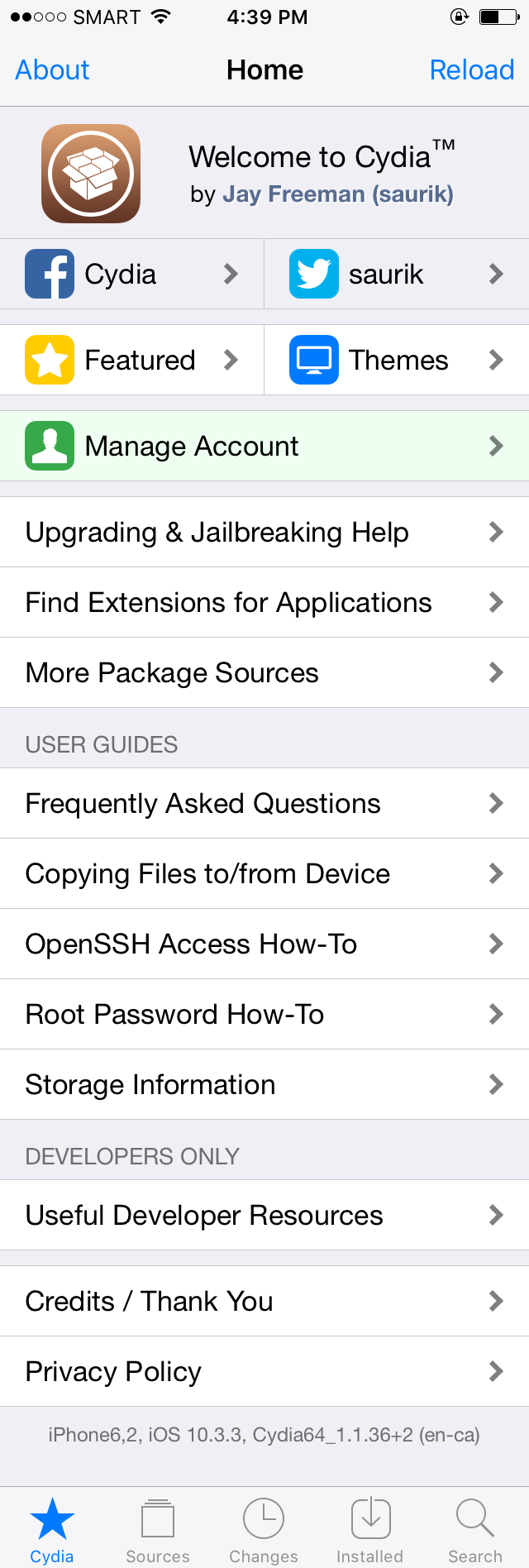
Cydia, a popular package manager installed on jailbroken devices

A package manager or package-management system is a collection of software tools that automates the process of installing, upgrading, configuring, and removing computer programs. For jailbreaks, this is essential for the installation of third-party content. There are a few package managers specifically for jailbroken iOS devices, of which the most popular are Cydia, Sileo, Zebra, Installer 5, and the now modern package manager Saily.

== Security concerns ==
Depending on the type of the jailbreak (i.e. 'rootless' or 'rootful'), different security structures may be compromised to various degrees. As jailbreaking grants freedom over running software that isn't confined to a sandbox typical to that of an App Store application, as well as modifications to system files, it ultimately allows for the threat of malware.

Users of a jailbroken device are also often forced to stay on an older iOS version that is no longer supported by Apple, commonly due to the unavailability of jailbreak on the newer versions. While using older versions of iOS is considered safe in most circumstances, the device may be vulnerable to publicly known security flaws.

In June 2021, ESET Research confirmed that malware did exist on one of the piracy repositories in the jailbreak community. The malware actively targeted iSecureOS to try to bypass the detection, but updates to the security app were quickly released and have mitigated the malware.

== Comparison to Android rooting ==
Jailbreaking of iOS devices has sometimes been compared to "rooting" of Android devices. Although both concepts involve privilege escalation, they do differ in scope.

Where Android rooting and jailbreaking are similar is that both are used to grant the owner of the device superuser system-level privileges, which may be transferred to one or more apps. However, unlike iOS phones and tablets, nearly all Android devices already offer an option to allow the user to sideload 3rd-party apps onto the device without having to install from an official source such as the Google Play store, although this is expected to change in September 2026 for Brazil, Indonesia, Singapore, and Thailand; and in 2027 worldwide. Many Android devices also provide owners the capability to modify or even replace the full operating system after unlocking the bootloader, although doing this requires a factory reset.

In contrast, iOS devices are engineered with restrictions including a "locked bootloader" which can not be unlocked by the owner to modify the operating system without violating Apple's end-user license agreement. And on iOS, until 2015, while corporations could install private applications onto corporate phones, sideloading unsanctioned, 3rd-party apps onto iOS devices from sources other than the App Store was prohibited for most individual users without a purchased developer membership. After 2015, the ability to install 3rd-party apps became free for all users; however, doing so requires a basic understanding of Xcode and compiling iOS apps.

Jailbreaking an iOS device to defeat all these security restrictions presents a significant technical challenge. Similar to Android, alternative iOS app stores utilizing enterprise certificates are available, offering modified or pirated releases of popular applications and video games, some of which were either previously released through Cydia or are unavailable on the App Store due to these apps not complying with Apple developer guidelines.

== Tools ==
=== Types ===
Many different types of jailbreaks have been developed over the years, differing in how and when the exploit is applied.

==== Untethered ====
When a jailbroken device is booting, it loads Apple's own boot software initially. The device is then exploited and the kernel is patched every time it is turned on. An untethered jailbreak is a jailbreak that does not require any assistance when it boots up. The kernel will be patched without the help of a computer or an application.

==== Tethered ====
A tethered jailbreak is the opposite of an untethered jailbreak, in the sense that a computer is required to boot the device. Without a computer running the jailbreaking software, the iOS device will not be able to boot at all. While using a tethered jailbreak, the user will still be able to restart/kill the device's SpringBoard process without needing to reboot. Many early jailbreaks were offered initially as tethered jailbreaks. The reason a computer is mandatory for booting is often related to the exploit targeting the device's iBoot process. While untethered jailbreaks find a way to make kernel patches persist in memory across reboots, the tethered exploit only temporarily modifies iBoot's signature verification checks. When the device is powered off, this temporary patch is lost. The unmodified iBoot then fails its integrity check on the modified files, preventing the device from booting until the computer is used to re-run the exploit and bypass the iBoot verification steps.

==== Semi-tethered ====
This type of jailbreak allows a user to reboot their phone normally, but upon doing so, the jailbreak and any modified code will be effectively disabled, as it will have an unpatched kernel. Any functionality independent of the jailbreak will still run as normal, such as making a phone call, texting, or using App Store applications. To be able to have a patched kernel and run modified code again, the device must be booted using a computer.

==== Semi-untethered ====
This type of jailbreak is like a semi-tethered jailbreak in which when the device reboots, it no longer has a patched kernel, but the key difference is that the kernel can be patched without using a computer. The kernel is usually patched using an application installed on the device without patches. This type of jailbreak has become increasingly popular, with most recent jailbreaks classified as semi-untethered.

=== History of tools ===
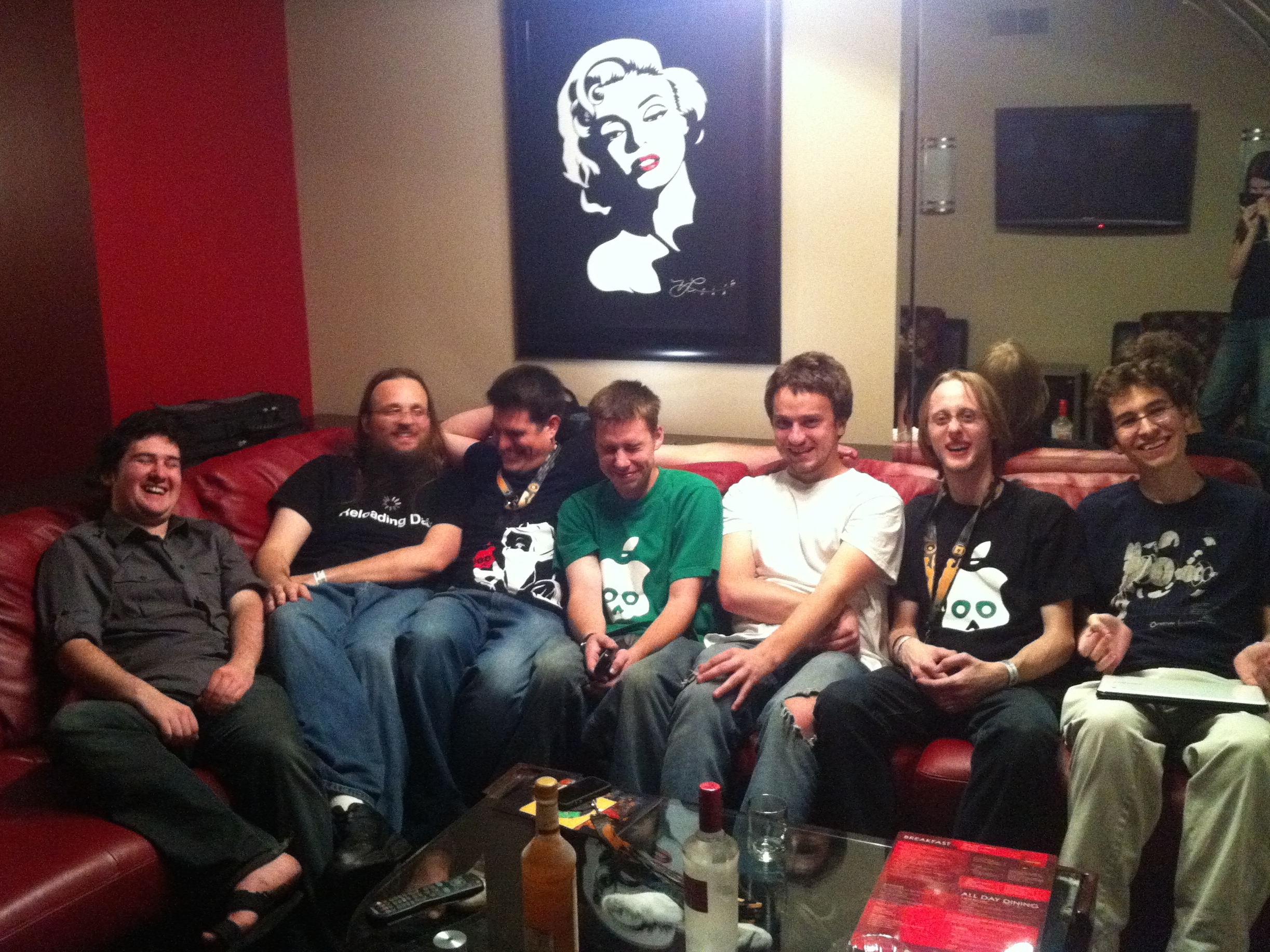
Several people (including saurik, p0sixninja, and geohot) who have contributed to building the early jailbreaking tools such as AppSnapp, greenpois0n, Absinthe, purplera1n, blackra1n, limera1n, and others. August 2011 at DEF CON.

==== JailbreakMe and AppSnapp ====
A few days after the original iPhone became available in July 2007, developers released the first jailbreaking tool for it, and soon a jailbreak-only game app became available. In October 2007, JailbreakMe 1.0 (also called "AppSnapp") allowed people to jailbreak iPhone OS 1.1.1 on both the iPhone and iPod Touch, and it included Installer.app as a way to get software for the jailbroken device.

==== ZiPhone ====
In February 2008, Zibri released ZiPhone, a tool for jailbreaking iPhone OS 1.1.3 and iPhone OS 1.1.4.

==== PwnageTool ====
The iPhone Dev Team, which is not affiliated with Apple, has released a series of free desktop-based jailbreaking tools. In July 2008 it released a version of PwnageTool to jailbreak the then new iPhone 3G on iPhone OS 2.0 as well as the iPod Touch, newly including Cydia as the primary third-party installer for jailbroken software. PwnageTool continues to be updated for untethered jailbreaks of newer iOS versions.

==== QuickPwn ====
In November 2008 the iPhone Dev Team released QuickPwn to jailbreak iPhone OS 2.2 on iPhone and iPod Touch, with options to enable past functionality that Apple had disabled on certain devices.

==== redsn0w ====
After Apple released iPhone OS 3.0 in June 2009, the Dev Team published redsn0w as a simple jailbreaking tool for Mac and Windows, and also updated PwnageTool primarily intended for expert users making custom firmware, and only for Mac. It continues to maintain redsn0w for jailbreaking most versions of iOS 4 and iOS 5 on most devices.

==== purplera1n & blackra1n ====
George Hotz developed the first iPhone unlock, which was a hardware-based solution. Later, in 2009, he released a jailbreaking tool for the iPhone 3G and iPhone 3GS on iPhone OS 3.0 called purplera1n, and blackra1n for iPhone OS version 3.1.2 on the 3rd generation iPod Touch and other devices.

==== limera1n ====
In October 2010, George Hotz released limera1n, a low-level exploit of boot ROM code that permanently works to jailbreak the iPhone 4 and is used as a part of tools including redsn0w.

==== Spirit and JailbreakMe ====
Nicholas Allegra (better known as "comex") released a program called Spirit in May 2010. Spirit jailbreaks devices including iPhones running iPhone OS 3.1.2, 3.1.3, and iPad running iPhone OS 3.2. In August 2010, comex released JailbreakMe 2.0, the first web-based tool to jailbreak the iPhone 4 (on iOS 4.0.1). In July 2011, he released JailbreakMe 3.0, a web-based tool for jailbreaking all devices on certain versions of iOS 4.3, including the iPad 2 for the first time (on iOS 4.3.3). It used a flaw in PDF file rendering in mobile Safari.

==== Greenpois0n ====
Chronic Dev Team initially released Greenpois0n in October 2010, a desktop-based tool for untethered jailbreaking iOS 4.1 and later iOS 4.2.1 on most devices including the Apple TV, as well as iOS 4.2.6 on CDMA (Verizon) iPhones.

==== ultrasn0w ====
As of December 2011, redsn0w included the "Corona" untether by pod2g for iOS 5.0.1 for iPhone 3GS, iPhone 4, iPad (1st generation), and iPod Touch (3rd and 4th generation). As of June 2012, redsn0w also includes the "Rocky Racoon" untether by pod2g for iOS 5.1.1 on all iPhone, iPad, and iPod Touch models that support iOS 5.1.1.

==== Absinthe ====
The iPhone Dev Team, Chronic Dev Team, and pod2g collaborated to release Absinthe in January 2012, a desktop-based tool to jailbreak the iPhone 4S for the first time and the iPad 2 for the second time, on iOS 5.0.1 for both devices and also iOS 5.0 for iPhone 4S. In May 2012 it released Absinthe 2.0, which can jailbreak iOS 5.1.1 untethered on all iPhone, iPad, and iPod Touch models that support iOS 5.1.1, including jailbreaking the third-generation iPad for the first time.

==== evasi0n ====
An iOS 6.X untethered jailbreak tool called "evasi0n" was released for Linux, OS X, and Windows on February 4, 2013. Due to the high volume of interest in downloading the jailbreak utility, the site initially gave anticipating users download errors. When Apple upgraded its software to iOS 6.1.3 it permanently patched out the evasi0n jailbreak.

==== TaiG ====
On November 29, 2014, TaiG team released their untethered jailbreak tool called "TaiG" for devices running iOS 8.0–8.1.1. On December 10, 2014, the app was updated to include support for iOS 8.1.2. On July 3, 2015, TaiG 2.3.0 was released, which includes support for iOS 8.0–8.4.

==== Pangu9 ====
On October 14, 2015, Pangu Team released Pangu9, their untethered jailbreak tool for iOS 9.0 through 9.0.2. On March 11, 2016, Pangu Team updated their tool to support iOS 9.1 for 64-bit devices.

=== Table of tools ===
Name	Release date	Hardware			iOS version		Untethered?	Developer(s)	License
Name	Release date	iPad	iPhone	iPod Touch	Oldest	Recent	Untethered?	Developer(s)	License
JailbreakMe 3.0	July 5, 2011	1; 2	3GS; 4	1	4.2.6	4.2.8; 4.3 – 4.3.3 (Note: The Verizon CDMA iPhone 4 ran on iOS 4.2.5 to 4.2.10, with incremental updates being bugfixes that were simultaneously applied from 4.3.1 to 4.3.5.)	Yes	comex	Proprietary
Seas0npass	October 18, 2011	2nd generation Apple TV			4.3	5.3; 6.1.2 (tethered)	4.3 – 5.3		GPLv3
redsn0w 0.9.15 beta 3	November 1, 2012	1	3GS; 4	1	4.1	6.1.6	Depends Untethered: 4.1 – 4.3.3; 4.2.6 – 4.2.8; 5.0.1; 5.1.1; 5.0 / 5.1 (only for iPhone 3GS with old boot ROM); Tethered: 4.2.9 – 4.2.10; 4.3.4 – 4.3.5; 5.0; 5.1; 6.0 – 6.1.6 (not available for devices newer than the iPhone 4, iPad 1, or iPod Touch 4)	iPhone Dev Team	Proprietary
Absinthe 2.0.4	May 30, 2012	1; 2; 3	3GS; 4; 4S	1	5.1.1		Yes	pod2g, Chronic Dev Team, iPhone Dev Team	Proprietary
evasi0n	February 4, 2013	2; 3; 4; Mini 1	3GS; 4; 4S; 5	4; 5	6.0	6.1.2	Yes	pod2g, MuscleNerd, pimskeks, and planetbeing (evad3rs)	Proprietary
evasi0n7	December 22, 2013	2; 3; 4; Air; Mini 1; Mini 2	4; 4S; 5; 5S; 5C	5	7.0	7.0.6	Yes	pod2g, MuscleNerd, pimskeks, and planetbeing (evad3rs)	Proprietary
p0sixspwn	December 30, 2013	2; 3; 4; Mini 1	3GS; 4; 4S; 5	4; 5	6.1.3	6.1.6	Yes	winocm, iH8sn0w, and SquiffyPwn	GPLv3
Pangu	June 23, 2014	2; 3; 4; Air; Mini 1; Mini 2	4; 4S; 5; 5C; 5S	5	7.1	7.1.2	Yes	dm557, windknown, ogc557, and Daniel_K4 (@PanguTeam)	Proprietary
Pangu8	October 22, 2014	2; 3; 4; Air; Air 2; Mini 1; Mini 2; Mini 3	4S; 5; 5C; 5S; 6; 6 Plus	5	8.0	8.1	Yes	windknown, ogc557, Daniel_K4, zengbanxian, INT80 (@PanguTeam)	Proprietary
TaiG	November 29, 2014	2; 3; 4; Air; Air 2; Mini 1; Mini 2; Mini 3	4S; 5; 5C; 5S; 6; 6 Plus	5; 6	8.0	8.4	Yes	TaiG	Proprietary
PPJailbreak	January 18, 2015	2; 3; 4; Air; Air 2; Mini 1; Mini 2; Mini 3	4S; 5; 5C; 5S; 6; 6 Plus	5; 6	8.0	8.4	Yes	PanguTeam and PPJailbreak	Proprietary
Pangu9	October 14, 2015	2; 3; 4; Air; Air 2; Mini 1; Mini 2; Mini 3; Mini 4; Pro	4S; 5; 5C; 5S; 6; 6 Plus; 6S; 6S Plus	5; 6	9.0	9.1	Yes	PanguTeam	Proprietary
Pangu9	March 23, 2016	4th generation Apple TV			9.0	9.0.1	Yes	PanguTeam	Proprietary
LiberTV	March 3, 2017	4th generation Apple TV			9.1	10.1	Semi-Untethered	Marco Grassi, Luca Todesco, Jonathan Levin	Proprietary
LiberTV 1.1	December 24, 2017	4th & 5th generation (4K) Apple TV			11.0	11.1	Semi-Untethered	Marco Grassi, Luca Todesco, Jonathan Levin	Proprietary
PPJailbreak	July 24, 2016	Air; Air 2; Mini 2; Mini 3; Mini 4; Pro	5S; 6; 6 Plus; 6S; 6S Plus; SE (1st)	6	9.2	9.3.3	Semi-Untethered	PanguTeam and PPJailbreak	Proprietary
mach_portal + Yalu	December 22, 2016	Pro	6S; 6S Plus; 7; 7 Plus	6	10.0.1	10.1.1 (depends on device)	Semi-Untethered	Luca Todesco	
yalu102	January 26, 2017	Air 2; Mini 2; Mini 3; Pro	5S; 6; 6 Plus; 6S; 6S Plus; SE (1st)	6	10.0.1	10.2	Semi-Untethered	Luca Todesco and Marco Grassi	WTFPL
Phœnix	August 6, 2017	2; 3; 4; Mini	4S; 5; 5C	5	9.3.5		Semi-Untethered	Siguza and tihmstar	Proprietary
Etason	September 19, 2017	2; 3; 4; Mini	4S; 5; 5C	5	8.4.1		Yes	tihmstar	Proprietary
Saïgon	October 15, 2017	Air 2; Mini 4	5S; 6; 6 Plus; 6S; 6S Plus; SE (1st)	6	10.2.1		Semi-Untethered	Abraham Masri	Proprietary
h3lix	December 24, 2017	4	5; 5c	No support	10.0	10.3.4	Semi-Untethered	tihmstar	Proprietary
Meridian	January 4, 2018	5; Air; Air 2; Mini 2; Mini 3; Mini 4; Pro	5S; 6; 6 Plus; 6S; 6S Plus; SE (1st)	6	10.0	10.3.3	Semi-Untethered	Sparkey, Ian Beer, Siguza, xerub, stek29, theninjaprawn, ARX8x, cheesecakeufo, FoxletFox, Sticktron, nullpixel, arpolix, EthanRDoesMC, CydiaBen, Comsecuris UG, Brandon Saldan, Lepidus, Cryptic, Samg_is_a_Ninja, M1sta	MIT
g0blin	January 13, 2018	5; Air; Air 2; Mini 2; Mini 3; Mini 4; Pro	5S; 6; 6 Plus; 6S; 6S Plus; SE (1st)	6	10.3	10.3.3	Semi-Untethered	Sticktron, Siguza, Ian Beer, windknown, Luca Todesco, xerub, tihmstar, saurik, uroboro, Abraham Masri, arx8x, PsychoTea, Cryptic	Proprietary
Spyware.lol	September 7, 2018	Air, Air 2; iPad Mini 2, Mini 4, Mini 3; iPad (5th generation); iPad Pro (9.7‑inch); iPad Pro (12.9‑inch); iPad Pro (10.5-inch); iPad Pro (12.9-inch) (2nd generation)	iPhone SE; iPhone 5s; iPhone 6s; iPhone 6; iPhone 6s plus; iPhone 6 plus; iPhone 7; iPhone 7 plus	6	10.0	10.3.3	Semi-Untethered	JakeBlair420	Proprietary
LiberiOS	December 25, 2017	Air 2; Mini 2; Mini 3; Mini 4; Pro	5S; 6; 6 Plus; 6S; 6S Plus; SE (1st); 7; 7 Plus; 8; 8 Plus; X	6	11.0	11.1.2	Semi-Untethered	Marco Grassi, Luca Todesco, Jonathan Levin, Ian Beer	Proprietary
Electra1112	January 12, 2018	5; Air; Air 2; Mini 2; Mini 3; Mini 4; Pro	5S; 6; 6 Plus; 6S; 6S Plus; SE (1st); 7; 7 Plus; 8; 8 Plus; X	6	11.0	11.1.2	Semi-Untethered	CoolStar, Ian Beer, xerub, Siguza, theninjaprawn, stek29, angelXwind, comex, isklikas, and goeo_, DHowett, and rpetrich	GPLv3
Electra1131	July 7, 2018	5; Air; Air 2; Mini 2; Mini 3; Mini 4; Pro	5S; 6; 6 Plus; 6S; 6S Plus; SE (1st); 7; 7 Plus; 8; 8 Plus; X	6	11.0	11.4.1	Semi-Untethered	CoolStar, Ian Beer, xerub, Siguza, theninjaprawn, Brandon Azad, stek29, Jamie Bishop, Pwn20wnd	GPLv3
ElectraTV	July 12, 2018	4th generation Apple TV			11.0	11.4.1	Semi-Untethered	nitoTV	
unc0ver	October 13, 2018	5; Air; Air 2; Mini 2; Mini 3; Mini 4; Pro	5S; 6; 6 Plus; 6S; 6S Plus; SE (1st); 7; 7 Plus; 8; 8 Plus; X; XS; XS Max; XR; 11; 11 Pro; 11 Pro Max; SE (2nd)	6; 7	11.0	14.8.1 (excludes 13.5.1)	Semi-Untethered	Pwn20wnd, Sam Bingner, Ian Beer, Brandon Azad, Jonathan Levin, xerub, sparkey, stek29, theninjaprawn	New BSD License
Chimera	April 30, 2019	5; Air; Air 2; Mini 2; Mini 3; Mini 4; Pro	5s; 6; 6 Plus; 6s; 6s Plus; SE (1st); 7; 7 Plus; 8; 8 Plus; X; XS; XS Max; XR	6; 7	12.0	12.5.7	Semi-Untethered	Coolstar, Jamie Bishop, tri'angle, ninjaprawn, Brandon Azad, PsychoTea, Ayden Panhuyzen, Umang Raghuvanshi, aesign	
checkra1n	November 10, 2019	All 64-bit iPads	5s; 6; 6 Plus; 6s; 6s Plus; SE (1st); 7; 7 Plus; 8; 8 Plus; X (all iPhones with A7 to A11 chips); 4th & 5th generation (4K) Apple TV	6; 7	12.0+	14.8.1	Semi-Tethered	argp, axi0mx, danyl931, jaywalker, kirb, littlelailo, nitoTV, nullpixel, pimskeks, qwertyoruiop, sbingner, siguza, haifisch, jndok, jonseals, xerub, lilstevie, psychotea, sferrini, Cellebrite, et al.	Proprietary
EtasonATV	January 22, 2020	3rd generation Apple TV			7.4+		Yes	tihmstar	Proprietary
Fugu	February 2, 2020	All A10-A10X-based iPads	7; 7 Plus	7	13.0	13.5.1	Semi-Tethered	Linus Henze	GPLv3
Odyssey	August 28, 2020	All iPads that support iOS 13	iPhone 6s or newer	7	13.0	13.7	Semi-Untethered	CoolStar, Hayden Seay, 23Aaron, Tihmstar	New BSD License
Taurine	April 1, 2021	A14 and below that support iOS 14	A14 and below that support iOS 14	7	14.0	14.8.1	Semi-Untethered	CoolStar, tihmstar, Diatrus, 23 Aaron, ModernPwner, pattern-f	BSD License
Fugu14	October 24, 2021	All A12-A14-based iPads	All A12-A14-based iPhones	No support	14.2	14.5.1	Yes	Linus Henze	MIT
p0laris	April 20, 2022	All A5/A5X-A6/A6X-based devices		5	9.3.5	9.3.6	Semi-Untethered	spv	LGPLv2.1
openpwnage	May 19, 2022	All A5/A5X-A6/A6X-based devices		5	8.4b4	9.3.6	Semi-Untethered	0xilis	LGPLv2.1
Blizzard Jailbreak	August 4, 2022	All A5/A5X-A6/A6X-based devices		5	8.4b4	9.3.6	Semi-Untethered	GeoSn0w	LGPLv3.0
palera1n	September 17, 2022	A11 and below that support iOS 15/16/17/18	A11 and below that support iOS 15/16	7	15.0	18.7.3 tvOS 26 (Apple TV HD and 4K 1st Gen only)	Semi-Tethered (Note: A tethered variant is also available prior to v2.0.0-beta.1.)	Nebula, Mineek, Nathan, Lakhan Lothiyi, Tom, Nick Chan, Flower	MIT
XinaA15	December 7, 2022	All A12-A15 based devices M1 based iPads		No support	15.0	15.4.1	Semi-Untethered	Xina520	Proprietary
Socket	February 25, 2023	All 32-bit devices that support iOS 10		No support	10.0	10.3.3	Yes (Note: Procyon untether was added in v1.3, versions before were semi-untethered.)	staturnz, LukeZGD	MIT
Dopamine	May 3, 2023	All A9-A16, M1-M2 based iPads	All A9-A17 pro based iPhones	7	15.0	26.0.1 / 18.7.1 (A12-A13) 18.7.1 (A9-A11) 17.3.1 (A12-A17 pro, M1-M2)	Semi-Untethered	Lars Fröder	MIT
Bootstrap	February 7, 2024	All A8-A15 based devices M1-M2 based iPads		7	15.0	17.0	Semi-Untethered	Tb	MIT
nathanlr	August 13, 2024	All A12-A15 based devices M1-M2 based iPads		No support	16.5.1	17.0	Semi-Untethered	verygenericname	New BSD License
Amethyst	June 23, 2026	All devices that support iOS 12/13		6; 7	12.0	13.7	Semi-Untethered	staturnz	MIT

== History of exploit-disabling patch releases ==
Apple has released various updates to iOS that patch exploits used by jailbreak utilities; this includes a patch released in iOS 6.1.3 to software exploits used by the original evasi0n iOS 6–6.1.2 jailbreak, in iOS 7.1 patching the Evasi0n 7 jailbreak for iOS 7–7.0.6-7.1 beta 3. Boot ROM exploits (exploits found in the hardware of the device) cannot be patched by Apple system updates but can be fixed in hardware revisions such as new chips or new hardware in its entirety, as occurred with the iPhone 3GS in 2009.

On July 15, 2011, Apple released a new iOS version that closed the exploit used in JailbreakMe 3.0. The German Federal Office for Information Security had reported that JailbreakMe uncovered the "critical weakness" that information could be stolen or malware unwillingly downloaded by iOS users clicking on maliciously crafted PDF files.

On August 13, 2015, Apple updated iOS to 8.4.1, patching the TaiG exploit. Pangu and Taig teams both said they were working on exploiting iOS 8.4.1, and Pangu demonstrated these chances at the WWDC 2015.

On September 16, 2015, iOS 9 was announced and made available; it was released with a new "Rootless" security system, dubbed a "heavy blow" to the jailbreaking community.

On October 21, 2015, seven days after the Pangu iOS 9.0–9.0.2 Jailbreak release, Apple pushed the iOS 9.1 update, which contained a patch that rendered it nonfunctional.

On January 23, 2017, Apple released iOS 10.2.1 to patch jailbreak exploits released by Google for the Yalu iOS 10 jailbreak created by Luca Todesco.

On December 10, 2019, Apple used DMCA takedown requests to remove posts from Twitter. The tweet contained an encryption key that could potentially be used to reverse engineer the iPhone's Secure Enclave. Apple later retracted the claim, and the tweet was reinstated.

On June 1, 2020, Apple released the 13.5.1 update, patching the zero-day exploit used by the Unc0ver jailbreak.

On September 20, 2021, Apple released iOS/iPadOS 15, which introduced signed system volume security to iOS/iPadOS, meaning that any changes to the root file system would revert to the latest snapshot on a reboot, and changes to the snapshot would make the device unbootable.

On March 11, 2026, Apple released the iOS 15.8.7 update to patch vulnerabilities used by the Coruna exploit kit. This temporarily patched Dopamine for devices stuck on iOS 15 and iPadOS 15 after over 2 years.

== Legality ==
The legal status of jailbreaking is affected by laws regarding circumvention of digital locks, such as laws protecting digital rights management (DRM) mechanisms. Many countries do not have such laws, and some countries have laws including exceptions for jailbreaking.

International treaties have influenced the development of laws affecting jailbreaking. The 1996 World Intellectual Property Organization (WIPO) Copyright Treaty requires nations party to the treaties to enact laws against DRM circumvention. The American implementation is the Digital Millennium Copyright Act (DMCA), which includes a process for establishing exemptions for non-copyright-infringing purposes such as jailbreaking. The 2001 European Copyright Directive implemented the treaty in Europe, requiring member states of the European Union to implement legal protections for technological protection measures. The Copyright Directive includes exceptions to allow breaking those measures for non-copyright-infringing purposes, such as jailbreaking to run alternative software, but member states vary on the implementation of the directive.

While Apple technically does not support jailbreaking as a violation of its EULA, jailbreaking communities have generally not been legally threatened by Apple. At least two prominent jailbreakers have been given positions at Apple, albeit in at least one case a temporary one. Apple has also regularly credited jailbreak developers with detecting security holes in iOS release notes.

Apple's support article concerning jailbreaking claims that they "may deny service for an iPhone, iPad, or iPod Touch that has installed any unauthorized software," which includes jailbreaking.

=== Australia ===
In 2010, Electronic Frontiers Australia said that it is unclear whether jailbreaking is legal in Australia, and that anti-circumvention laws may apply. These laws had been strengthened by the Copyright Amendment Act 2006.

=== Canada ===
In November 2012, Canada amended its Copyright Act with new provisions prohibiting tampering with DRM protection, with exceptions including software interoperability. Jailbreaking a device to run alternative software is a form of circumventing digital locks for the purpose of software interoperability.

There had been several efforts from 2008–2011 to amend the Copyright Act (Bill C-60, Bill C-61, and Bill C-32) to prohibit tampering with digital locks, along with initial proposals for C-11 that were more restrictive, but those bills were set aside. In 2011, Michael Geist, a Canadian copyright scholar, cited iPhone jailbreaking as a non-copyright-related activity that overly-broad Copyright Act amendments could prohibit.

=== India ===
India's copyright law permits circumventing DRM for non-copyright-infringing purposes. Parliament introduced a bill including this DRM provision in 2010 and passed it in 2012 as Copyright (Amendment) Bill 2012. India is not a signatory to the WIPO Copyright Treaty that requires laws against DRM circumvention, but being listed on the US Special 301 Report "Priority Watch List" applied pressure to develop stricter copyright laws in line with the WIPO treaty.

=== New Zealand ===
New Zealand's copyright law allows the use of technological protection measure (TPM) circumvention methods as long as the use is for legal, non-copyright-infringing purposes. This law was added to the Copyright Act 1994 as part of the Copyright (New Technologies) Amendment Act 2008.

=== Singapore ===
Jailbreaking might be legal in Singapore if done to provide interoperability and not circumvent copyright, but that has not been tested in court.

=== United Kingdom ===
The law Copyright and Related Rights Regulations 2003 makes circumventing DRM protection measures legal for the purpose of interoperability but not copyright infringement. Jailbreaking may be a form of circumvention covered by that law, but this has not been tested in court. Competition laws may also be relevant.

=== United States ===
The main law that affects the legality of iOS jailbreaking in the United States is the 1998 Digital Millennium Copyright Act (DMCA), which says "no person shall circumvent a technological measure that effectively controls access to a work protected under" the DMCA, since this may apply to jailbreaking. Every three years, the law allows the public to propose exemptions for legitimate reasons for circumvention, which last three years if approved. In 2010 and 2012, the U.S. Copyright Office approved exemptions that allowed smartphone users to jailbreak their devices legally, and in 2015 the Copyright Office approved an expanded exemption that also covers other all-purpose mobile computing devices, such as tablets. It is still possible Apple may employ technical countermeasures to prevent jailbreaking or prevent jailbroken phones from functioning. It is unclear whether it is legal to traffic in the tools used to make jailbreaking easy.

In 2010, Apple announced that jailbreaking "can violate the warranty".

==== Digital Millennium Copyright Act exemptions ====
In 2007, Tim Wu, a professor at Columbia Law School, argued that jailbreaking "Apple's superphone is legal, ethical, and just plain fun." Wu cited an explicit exemption issued by the Library of Congress in 2006 for personal carrier unlocking, which notes that locks "are used by wireless carriers to limit the ability of subscribers to switch to other carriers, a business decision that has nothing whatsoever to do with the interests protected by copyright" and thus do not implicate the DMCA. Wu did not claim that this exemption applies to those who help others unlock a device or "traffic" in software to do so.

In 2010, in response to a request by the Electronic Frontier Foundation, the U.S. Copyright Office explicitly recognized an exemption to the DMCA to permit jailbreaking in order to allow iPhone owners to use their phones with applications that are not available from Apple's store, and to unlock their iPhones for use with unapproved carriers. Apple had previously filed comments opposing this exemption and indicated that it had considered jailbreaking to be a violation of copyright (and by implication prosecutable under the DMCA). Apple's request to define copyright law to include jailbreaking as a violation was denied as part of the 2009 DMCA rulemaking. In their ruling, the Library of Congress affirmed on July 26, 2010, that jailbreaking is exempt from DMCA rules with respect to circumventing digital locks. DMCA exemptions must be reviewed and renewed every three years or else they expire.

On October 28, 2012, the US Copyright Office released a new exemption ruling. The jailbreaking of smartphones continued to be legal "where circumvention is accomplished for the sole purpose of enabling interoperability of [lawfully obtained software] applications with computer programs on the telephone handset." However, the U.S. Copyright office refused to extend this exemption to tablets, such as iPads, arguing that the term "tablets" is broad and ill-defined, and an exemption to this class of devices could have unintended side effects. The Copyright Office also renewed the 2010 exemption for unofficially unlocking phones to use them on unapproved carriers, but restricted this exemption to phones purchased before January 26, 2013. In 2015, these exemptions were extended to include other devices, including tablets.

== Risks ==
=== Security, privacy and stability ===
The first iPhone worm, iKee, appeared in early November 2009, created by a 21-year-old Australian student in the town of Wollongong. He told Australian media that he created the worm to raise awareness of security issues: jailbreaking allows users to install an SSH service, which those users can leave in the default insecure state. In the same month, F-Secure reported on a new malicious worm compromising bank transactions from jailbroken phones in the Netherlands, similarly affecting devices where the owner had installed SSH without changing the default password.

Restoring a device with iTunes removes a jailbreak. However, doing so generally updates the device to the latest, and possibly non-jailbreakable, version, due to Apple's use of SHSH blobs. There are many applications that aim to prevent this, by restoring the devices to the same version they are currently running whilst removing the jailbreaks. Examples are, Succession, Semi-Restore and Cydia Eraser.

In 2012, Forbes staff analyzed a UCSB study on 1,407 free programs available from Apple and a third-party source. Of the 1,407 free apps investigated, 825 were downloaded from Apple's App Store using the website App Tracker, and 526 from BigBoss (Cydia's default repository). 21% of official apps tested leaked device ID and 4% leaked location. Unofficial apps leaked 4% and 0.2% respectively. 0.2% of apps from Cydia leaked photos and browsing history, while the App Store leaked none. Unauthorized apps tended to respect privacy better than official ones. Also, a program available in Cydia called PrivaCy allows user to control the upload of usage statistics to remote servers.

In August 2015, the KeyRaider malware was discovered, affecting only jailbroken iPhones.

=== Fake/scam jailbreaks ===
As of 2019, in previous years, due to the technical complexity and often rarity of legitimate jailbreaking software (especially untethered jailbreaks) there had been an increase in websites offering fake iOS jailbreaks. These websites often ask for payment or make heavy use of advertising, but have no actual jailbreak to offer. Others install a fake, lookalike version of the Cydia package manager. In some cases, users have been asked to download free-to-play apps or fill out surveys to complete a (non-existent) jailbreak.

== See also ==
- Hacking of consumer electronics
- iOS version history
- Linux on Apple devices
