= Absynthe =

Absynthe may refer to:

- An alternate spelling of absinthe, an alcoholic beverage
- Absynthe (album), a 2003 album by Monsieur Camembert
- The Absynthe, a Trent University campus newsmedia organization
