= Installer.app =

Freeware software installer for the iPhone

Installer
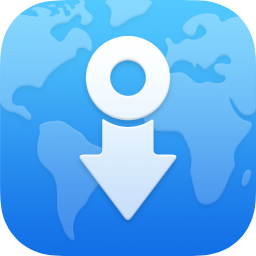
- Icon as of Installer 5.0
- Original author: Nullriver (Installer 1-3)
- Developers: Nullriver, Inc., Sammy Guichelaar, Kevin Rippert, MidnightChips, AppTapp Team (Installer 5), RipDev (Installer 4)
- Written in: Objective-C
- Operating system: iOS
- Platform: ARM
- Type: Package manager
- License: Closed source
- Website: http://www.nullriver.com, http://ripdev.org, http://infini-dev.org, https://apptapp.me

Installer.app was a freeware software installer for the iPhone created by Nullriver and later maintained by RipDev, first released in summer 2007 and maintained until summer 2009. Installer allowed users to install third-party applications into the iPhone's Applications directory where native applications are kept. Users could install applications from a variety of sources (over Wi-Fi or UMTS) provided by software developers or directly onto the iPhone without requiring a computer. Users could browse lists of applications inside Installer to find ones they wanted to install. In June 2009, RipDev dropped support for Installer in favor of developing a different package manager and installer named Icy.

== Releases ==
=== iPhone OS 2 ===
When the 2.0 firmware was released, framework changes were present. All of the applications compiled for iPhone OS 1.2 and below were no longer able to run on 2.0. Therefore, Installer 3 wasn't available for 2.0 and the vast majority of users switched to Cydia. At that time, RiPDev (Russian iPhone Development) took over the Installer project and started developing Installer 4.0. When Installer 4.0 was finished, it was added to the QuickPwn software as a payload. Installer 4.0 did not gain as much popularity as Installer 3.0 because most of the jailbreak users had become accustomed to using Cydia.

=== iOS 4 and 5 ===
In May 2011, a team of developers called Infini-Dev recreated Installer 4 so that it could be run on iOS 4 and above, although the main current repositories are only compatible with Cydia and no longer compatible with Installer. RiPDev has put their old Installer repo back online since Infini-Dev released Installer, and there are also some other repos like Greek-iPhone who offer up to date packages for Installer.

=== Installer 5 ===
In 2014, Slava Karpenko announced a project to work on Installer 5. Later, Karpenko revealed to Infini-Dev that he had dropped the project. Infini-Dev took over after a while and moved the project under the AppTapp Team name. A public beta was released on July 3, 2019, and it officially launched on January 15, 2020.
