= Cydia =

iOS package manager

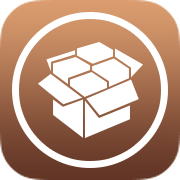

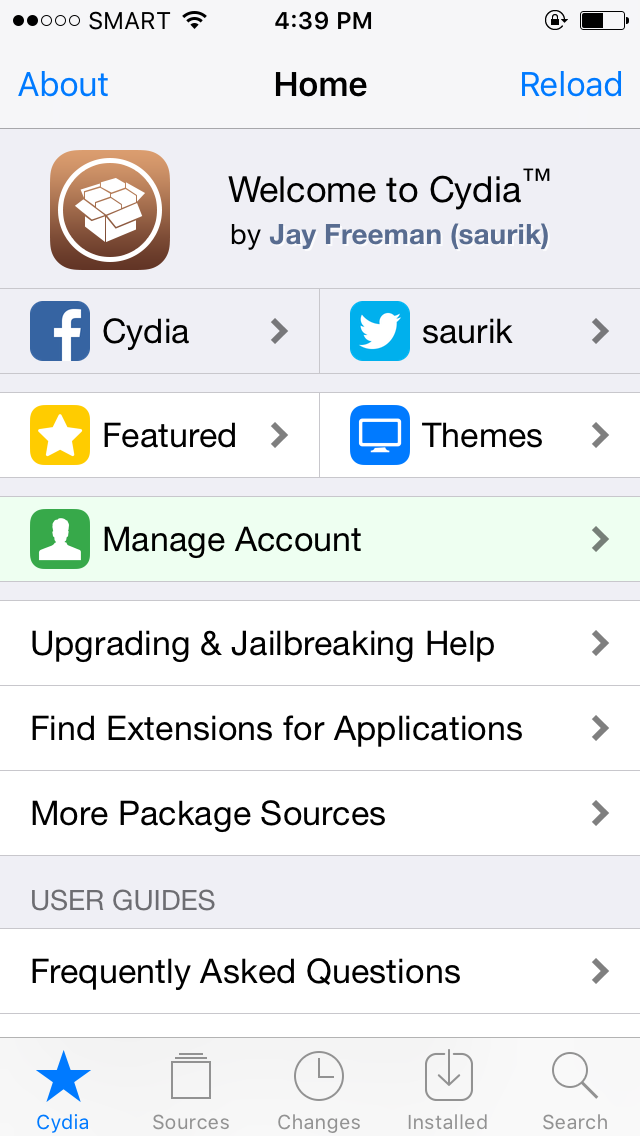
- Cydia running on an iPhone 5s, jailbroken on iOS 10.3.3
- Developer: Jay Freeman (saurik)
- Release: February 28, 2008; 18 years ago
- Stable release: 1.1.36 / June 24, 2020; 6 years ago
- Operating system: iOS, iPadOS
- Available in: Arabic, Chinese, Dutch, English, French, German, Greek, Hebrew, Italian, Japanese, Korean, Polish, Portuguese, Russian, Spanish, Swedish, Thai, Turkish, Vietnamese.
- Type: Package manager
- License: GPLv3
- Website: cydia.saurik.com
- Repository: git.saurik.com/cydia.git

Cydia is a graphical user interface of APT for iOS. It enables a user to find and install software unauthorized by Apple on jailbroken iPhones, iPads and iPod touch devices. It also refers to the digital distribution platform for software on iOS accessed through Cydia software. Most of the software packages available through Cydia are free of charge, although some require purchasing.

Cydia is developed by Jay Freeman (named "saurik") and his company, SaurikIT. The name "Cydia" is a reference to the moth genus Cydia, notably the codling moth (Cydia pomonella), which eats fruits such as apples and pears.

== Purpose and function ==
Cydia provides a graphical user interface (GUI) to jailbroken devices using Advanced Packaging Tool (a package manager) repositories to install software unavailable on the App Store. Cydia is based on UIKit and was written by Jay Freeman after porting APT to iOS as part of his Telesphoreo project.

Packages are downloaded through the list of repositories a user has installed. Apps are installed in the same location as Apple's own applications, in the /Application directory. Jailbroken devices can also still buy and download apps normally from the official App Store. Some jailbreaking tools install Cydia automatically, while others may not.

=== Software availability ===
Some of the packages available through Cydia are standard applications, while most packages are extensions and modifications for the iOS interface and for apps in the iOS ecosystem. Some Cydia repositories host open source packages as well as paid modifications for jailbroken devices. These modifications are based on a framework called Cydia Substrate (formally MobileSubstrate).

Many ports of existing POSIX-compliant command line tools are available on Cydia as well, including bash, coreutils and OpenSSH, meaning the device could potentially be used as a full-fledged BSD workstation, although missing some development tools.

==== Cydia Store ====
In March 2009, the now-defunct blog TUAW (The Unofficial Apple Weblog) announced that the Cydia Store, the in-app software purchasing system for Cydia, had opened for sales. The announcement also mentioned that Amazon payments was the only option available, but that PayPal would be added in the future. PayPal later became a payment option as well. Cydia stopped accepting Amazon Payments in 2015, leaving PayPal as the sole payment option. After a bug related to PayPal's digital token authorization was discovered via TechCrunch, Freeman decided to shut down the Cydia Store on December 16, 2018.

==== Security ====
The risks in jailbreaking are mixed. Advocates offer that developer tools installed from Cydia can help add extra security. However, being able to install untrusted third-party software can cause data loss and malware. Cydia Substrate, the code injection library usually installed alongside Cydia, will detect if an installed package causes SpringBoard to crash, and will reboot it in a "safe mode", with all third-party packages temporarily disabled.

== History ==
Freeman first released Cydia in February 2008 as an open-source alternative to Installer.app on iPhone OS.

In August 2009, Wired reported that Freeman claimed about 4 million, or 10 percent of the 40 million iPhone and iPod Touch owners to date, have installed Cydia.

In September 2010, SaurikIT, LLC, announced that it had acquired Rock Your Phone, Inc. (makers of Rock.app). SaurikIT and Rock Your Phone were the two largest providers of third-party apps at the time.

On December 15, 2010, SaurikIT filed a dispute with World Intellectual Property Organization against Cykon Technology Limited of Kowloon, Hong Kong over the rights to the domain name "Cydia.com", which was registered in 2002. SaurikIT contended that Cykon registered the domain name in bad faith and the domain name incorporates SaurikIT's trademark. SaurikIT initially attempted to purchase the domain, then demanded Cykon to forfeit the domain at cost asserting trademark rights followed by bringing a WIPO proceeding. The complaint was denied by WIPO.

As of April 2011, Cydia had a $10 million in annual revenue and 4.5 million weekly users and according to Freeman's $250,000 net annual profit.

On August 18, 2011, SaurikIT filed a lawsuit against Hong Kong owner of Cydia.com regarding the same domain name.

In early 2013, Saurik announced that all of the SHSH data that Cydia had saved for users with devices on iOS 6.0 through iOS 6.1.2 had been corrupted; iOS 6.1.3 SHSH data were unaffected. The TSS Center within Cydia had a notice titled, Where is my "iOS 6.0–6.1.2"? (with a sad face emoji at the end). There was no TSS Center before this incident.

On December 24, 2013, Cydia was updated to run on iOS 7 and iOS 7.1.

On February 26, 2018, CoolStar launched the initial release of Electra, giving access to Cydia from iOS versions 11.0-11.1.2. Alongside Electra for iOS 11, CoolStar released several patches for Cydia, creating a Cydia version compatible with the Electra jailbreak, as Electra had been released while Saurik was still working on updates for Cydia. Saurik eventually released the update, and pushed the update to iOS devices running iOS 11 with Cydia at the time. CoolStar's patched version of Cydia turned out to be incompatible with Saurik's new update.

== See also ==
- Linux on Apple devices
