= ITunes Radio =

Former Internet radio service by Apple

iTunes Radio

- iTunes Radio on an iPhone running iOS 7
- Developer: Apple Inc.
- Launched: September 18, 2013; 13 years ago
- Discontinued: January 28, 2016
- Platforms: iOS 7—iOS 9, OS X 10.7—10.11, Windows, Apple TV Radio
- Pricing model: Free (ad-supported) iTunes Match (ad-free)
- Availability: United States, Australia (Discontinued, all functions of iTunes Radio is now integrated and is part of the Apple Music subscription service.)
- Website: www.apple.com/itunes/itunes-radio at the Wayback Machine (archived June 8, 2015)

Availability of Apple Music

iTunes Radio was an Internet radio service by Apple Inc. that let users listen to automatically generated playlists based on direct input as well as collected data on music preferences. It was launched on September 18, 2013, as part of iOS 7 and was available in the Music app on iOS devices and Apple TV (2nd generation and newer) as well as in iTunes 11.1 on OS X (10.7 Lion; it requires Mac OS 10.7.5 or newer to run) and Windows. It was only available in the United States and Australia.

With the release of iOS 8.4 and iTunes 12.2, nearly all functions of iTunes Radio have become part of Apple's music streaming service Apple Music and was henceforth called just Radio or Apple Music Radio. On January 15, 2016, Apple announced that effective January 28, 2016, iTunes Radio stations, barring Beats 1, will only be accessible by Apple Music subscribers.

== History ==
Apple announced the Internet radio service at its June 10, 2013 Apple Worldwide Developers Conference (WWDC) keynote speech. The service launched in the United States on September 18, 2013, the same day as the release of iOS 7, and in Australia on February 11, 2014. Reports of a streaming music service from Apple circulated for weeks before the announcement.

As of January 2015, iTunes Radio was only available in the United States and Australia. Apple had announced plans to offer the service in other countries. In October 2013, Bloomberg reported that Apple had plans to expand the service to the UK, Canada, and New Zealand by early 2014. With the release of Apple Music, most functions of iTunes Radio had become available in 100 countries, although iTunes Radio itself remained limited to the United States and Australia as a free service.

On January 15, 2016, Apple announced that effective January 28, 2016, iTunes Radio stations, barring Beats 1, will only be accessible by Apple Music subscribers. On January 29, 2016, the iTunes Radio channel was automatically removed from Apple TV devices (3rd Generation and earlier).

== Features ==
iTunes Radio was a free, ad-supported service available to all iTunes users, featuring Siri integration on iOS. Users were able to skip tracks, customize stations, and purchase the station's songs from the iTunes Store. Users could also search through their history of previous songs. The number of track skips was limited like Pandora Radio's service. iTunes Match subscribers could be able to use an ad-free version of the service. The service has pre-loaded stations, including a playlist of trending songs on Twitter.

The service also generated a radio station based on input like a single artist with songs by them and others similar. The service's selection was expected to learn the user's preferences from input whether the user likes or dislikes the track.

== Apple Music integration ==
Former Apple CEO Steve Jobs was previously opposed to the idea of music subscription services. Through its purchase of audio equipment maker Beats Electronics in 2014, Apple gained ownership of its own service Beats Music. With Beats Music CEO Ian Rogers also becoming responsible for the ad-supported iTunes Radio service, Business Insider later reported that Apple was planning to merge the two services. Apple also hired noted British radio DJ Zane Lowe to serve as a music curator.

After a period of rumors and anticipation, the Apple Music music subscription service was announced at Apple's June 2015 Worldwide Developers Conference. The "one more thing" reveal had been confirmed by Sony Music CEO Doug Morris and The Wall Street Journal reports prior to the announcement. Apple Music launched on June 30, 2015, and Beats Music was later discontinued, with all subscribers being migrated to Apple Music.
