= Control Center (Apple) =

Apple device feature

- Control Center on an iPhone 15 running iOS 26
- Developer: Apple Inc.
- Operating system: iOS 7 and later; iPadOS; macOS 11 Big Sur and later; visionOS

Control Center (or Control Centre in British English, Australian English, and Canadian English) is a feature of Apple's iOS, iPadOS, macOS, watchOS, tvOS and visionOS operating systems. It was introduced as part of iOS 7, released on September 18, 2013. In iOS 7, it replaces the control pages found in previous versions. It gives iOS and iPadOS devices direct access to important settings for the device by swiping down from the top right corner on the iPhone X and newer, and on all iPad models starting with iOS 12 or iPadOS, with previous models using a swipe from the bottom of the screen. It is similar to the SBSettings tweak for iOS jailbreaking. Control Center was also added to Macs in macOS 11 Big Sur, released on November 12, 2020.

== Usage ==
=== iOS and iPadOS ===
Control Center gives iOS and iPadOS users quick access to commonly used controls and apps. By swiping up from any screen–including the Lock screen (if the control center is set to be accessed from the lock screen)–users can do such things as switch on Airplane mode, turn Wi-Fi on or off, adjust the display brightness, text size, and other similar basic functions of the device.

Since iOS 7, it has also included an integrated flashlight function to operate the reverse camera's flash LED as a flashlight. The flashlight feature is only available on iPhone and iPod Touch, and iPad Pro. Beginning with iOS 9.3, a Night Shift toggle became available through the Control Center on all iPhone, iPod Touch and iPad models that have an Apple A7 chip or later.

Other functions are offered, such as the ability to turn Bluetooth and Do Not Disturb on or off; lock the screen's orientation; play, pause, or skip a song, see what is playing; connect to AirPlay-enabled devices; and quickly access the clock, calculator, and camera apps. Users also have access to AirDrop, previously only available on Macs and newly added to iPhone, iPad, and iPod Touch models using the Lightning connector in iOS 7, as a method of transferring files between Apple devices.

=== macOS ===
Introduced with macOS 11 Big Sur in 2020, Control Center on macOS gives users quick access to many system-level settings such as WiFi, Bluetooth, and Airdrop, as well as display brightness and system volume. The Control Center icon is on the right side of the menu bar.

=== visionOS ===
Apple's spatial computing platform launched with Control Center, providing access to similar settings as iOS, as well as visionOS-specific features such as guest user access, Mac virtual display, and travel mode.

== History ==
=== iOS/iPadOS ===
In iOS 7, Control Center was introduced. It featured a single-paged slide up panel with a blurred background, which provided a layer of translucency over the content below.

In iOS 7.1, the sliders for the brightness toggle and sound toggle were made to be able to be flicked, while a bouncing animation was added and text to show what app is causing the media controls to play was added.

In iOS 8, the break lines around the square toggles were replaced by transparent squares, while the circular toggles were made to turn fully white when pressed instead and their outlines (which previously did so) were removed.

In iOS 9, San Francisco, a new system font, replaced Helvetica Neue as the typeface.

In iOS 9.3, a new Night Shift toggle was introduced. It is available on all iPhone, iPod Touch and iPad models that have an Apple A7 chip or later.

In iOS 10, Control Center was redesigned. The toggles are now mostly colorized, and box squared. The AirPlay and AirDrop toggles have switched locations, and are relocated to make way for the bigger night shift toggle. Two new pages are also introduced, the first consists of the media controls formerly located on the main page, and the second adds toggles for controlling HomeKit enabled devices linked in the Home application. On the iPad, it is redesigned as a single menu with less options, with the toggles instead being bigger.

Control Center received a redesign in iOS 11. As in iOS 9, it features a single page, with the media controls having returned to and HomeKit controls being moved to the main page, in addition, users can now 3D Touch (or long press on devices without 3D Touch) most of the toggles for additional options, and vertical sliders allow users to adjust volume and brightness. The toggles themselves either appear on small black backgrounds or no longer appear as part of a background at all, with the actual home screen itself being blurred instead. The menu is now made to require pulling down from the top of the upper right corner on iPhones, and pressing the home button at least twice on iPads, the latter sharing the screen with the multitasker. Many new toggles are introduced. Unlike prior versions, Control Center is customizable via the Settings app, and allows for a wider range of settings features to be shown, including cellular service, Low Power Mode, and a shortcut to the Notes app. The way the Wi-Fi and cellular functions work was tweaked to now automatically turn on 24 hours after the iPhone was disconnected.

In iOS 11.2, a new visual effect was added for turning off the Wi-Fi and Bluetooth toggles, instead of graying out, they white out. A notification was also added when they are pressed for the first time, explaining their functionality, replaced by text above the menu from the second time onward.

In iOS 12, a change was made to the Do Not Disturb toggle, allowing 3D Touching or long pressing the icon to access a menu of preset durations of a Do Not Disturb session. It was also revamped on the iPad, with it now being pulled down from the top right of the screen in an identical way to as on the iPhone, it was also given a redesigned status bar.

In iOS 12.2, a Airplay toggle was introduced.

In iOS 13 and iPadOS 13, a new dark mode toggle was added, which has support for haptic touch, the toggles for Brightness, Night Shift, True Tone, Wi-Fi, and Bluetooth were updated to match.

In iOS 14 and iPadOS 14, Control Center has a few changes. It gained a sleep tracking toggle, a sound recognition toggle, a NFC tag toggle, and a Shazam toggle. The media control toggle has been redesigned slightly. New toggles for HomeKit have been added for different devices, and are now dynamically suggested. New icons are added for when apps that have recently accessed the camera, the microphone or the phones location.

iOS 14.3 adds a new App Clip toggle.

In iOS 15 and iPadOS 15, Control Center had the dedicated do not disturb toggle replaced with a new Focus toggle, which can be held own to select four options, Work, Sleep, Do Not Disturb or a custom choice. It also receives a new Keyboard Brightness toggle, a text size toggle, a video effects toggle, and a Mike Mode toggle. The low power mode toggle was also added to the iPad.

In iOS 16 and iPadOS 16, Control Center was given a redesigned battery icon. In addition, a toggle was added for quick notes, and the Shazam toggle having its history feature merged with the Shazam application.

In iOS 16.2, the Everyone option of the airplay toggle was changed to switch to Contacts Only after 10 minutes.

In iOS 17 and iPadOS 17, the ability to turn on Silence Notifications from the do not disturb choice in the Focus toggle was introduced.

In iOS 18 and iPadOS 18, a complete redesign was introduced. The new Control Center features new design featuring more circular buttons for the single toggles, curved corners for the hard tap controls, multiple vertical pages of different classes of controls, allowing the user to separate controls for connectivity, media, home, or a user's favorite controls, and an option to create new groups or pages personalized by the user. It also allows editing the size of each control (With exceptions being the volume and brightness sliders, among others) using a "wiggle mode" similar to editing the iPhone and iPad Home Screen. There is also a small "+" button in the top left that allows for opening the controls gallery and adding more controls, including 3rd-party controls for specific apps, replacing the option to do so in settings.

In iOS 18.1, the toggles for accessing internet and cellular related features was redesigned.

In iOS 18.4, new toggles for Apple intelligence were added, while animations for using the volume and brightness sliders were introduced.

In iOS 26, a purely visual redesign to the Control Center was introduced with the Liquid Glass design language and rounder brightness/volume toggles.

In iOS 27, Control Center gains dyamic widgets, similar to the home screen.

=== macOS ===
Introduced with macOS 11 Big Sur in 2020, Control Center on macOS gives users quick access to many system-level settings such as WiFi, Bluetooth, and Airdrop, as well as display brightness and system volume. The Control Center icon is on the right side of the menu bar.

macOS Tahoe brings the Control Centre closer to its iOS variant, having more customisation and a more consistent feel, ditching the unique design used since macOS Big Sur.

=== visionOS ===
In visionOS 1, the Control Center is accessed by looking up and selecting the Control Center icon (a downward-facing chevron) that appears at the top of the users' view. in visionOS 2, access to Control Center has been replaced with a new hand gesture.

== Reception ==
Control Center has received generally positive reviews. In contrast for the user having to access the Settings application to change most preferences, Darrell Etherington of TechCrunch thought that "separating [Control Center] from that function and making it accessible throughout the iOS user interface via a simple swipe up from bottom is a really big improvement."

The iOS 11 update was criticized for changing the way the buttons for Wi-Fi and Bluetooth work; more specifically, the toggles would disconnect devices from Wi-Fi or Bluetooth, while leaving the radios on. The Electronic Frontier Foundation stated that this change not only hurt battery life, but was also bad for security, describing the buttons as turning Wi-Fi and Bluetooth "off-ish" (greyed out, but not crossed out, as it would appear if switched off directly from the Settings app), as well as further criticizing the connections resuming at 5:00 am every day.
