= A9X =

A9X may refer to:

- Apple A9X, a microprocessor architecture
- Holden LX Torana A9X, an Australian touring car
- A variant of the AIM-9 Sidewinder, an air-to-air missile
