= IPad Pro (1st generation) =

Tablet computer developed by Apple (2015–2017)

iPad Pro (1st generation)

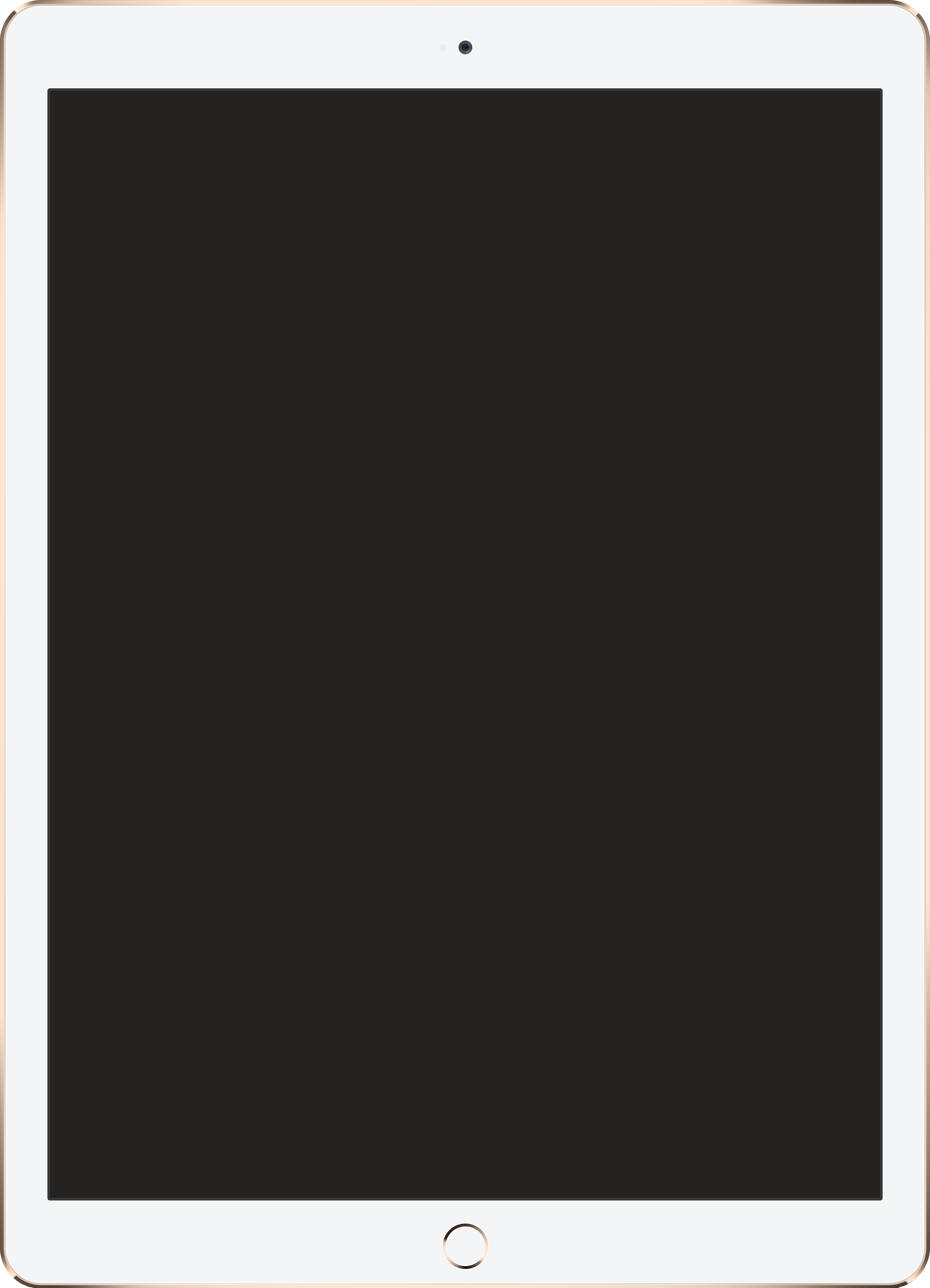
- 12.9-inch iPad Pro in Gold
- Developer: Apple Inc.
- Manufacturer: Foxconn (on contract)
- Product family: iPad
- Type: Tablet computer
- Generation: 1st
- Released: November 11, 2015; 10 years ago (12.9-inch); March 31, 2016; 10 years ago (9.7-inch)
- Discontinued: June 5, 2017; 9 years ago
- Operating system: Original: iOS 9.1 (for 12.9-inch); iOS 9.3 (for 9.7-inch); Current: iPadOS 16.7.16, released May 11, 2026
- System on a chip: Apple A9X and Apple M9 motion coprocessor
- CPU: 2.26 GHz dual-core 64-bit ARMv8-A
- Memory: 12.9-inch: 4 GB LPDDR4 SDRAM; 9.7-inch: 2 GB LPDDR4 SDRAM
- Storage: 32, 128, 256 GB flash memory
- Display: 12.9-inch: 2732×2048 px (264 PPI) (IPS panel) (5.5 megapixels), 12.9 in (327.8 mm) diagonal, 4:3 9.7-inch: 2048×1536 px (264 PPI) (IPS panel) (3.1 megapixels), 9.7 in (246.3 mm) diagonal, 4:3
- Graphics: 12-core PowerVR Series 7XT
- Sound: Four speaker audio
- Input: Multi-touch screen, headset controls and ambient light sensors, 3-axis accelerometer, 3-axis gyroscope, digital compass, five microphones, Bosch Sensortec BMP280 barometer
- Camera: 12.9-inch: 1.2 megapixels 720p front-facing and 8 megapixels rear-facing; 9.7-inch: 5 megapixels 720p front-facing and 12 megapixels 4K rear-facing
- Connectivity: Wi-Fi 802.11 a/b/g/n/ac; dual channel (2.4 GHz and 5 GHz); HT80 with MIMO; Bluetooth 4.2; Wi-Fi + Cellular models: GPS & GLONASS; GSM/EDGE; CDMA EV-DO Rev. A and B.; 12.9-inch: LTE (up to 20 bands); 9.7-inch: LTE Advanced (up to 23 bands)
- Power: Built-in lithium-ion battery: 12.9-in: 3.77 V 10,307 mAh; 9.7-inch: 3.82 V 7,306 mAh
- Online services: App Store, Apple Music, iTunes Store, iBookstore, iCloud, Game Center
- Dimensions: 12.9-inch: 305.7 mm (12.04 in); 220.6 mm (8.69 in); 6.9 mm (0.27 in); 9.7-inch: 240 mm (9.4 in); 169.5 mm (6.67 in); 6.1 mm (0.24 in)
- Weight: 12.9-inch Wi-Fi: 713 g (1.572 lb); 12.9-inch Wi-Fi + Cellular: 723 g (1.594 lb); 9.7-inch Wi-Fi: 437 g (0.963 lb); 9.7-inch Wi-Fi + Cellular: 444 g (0.979 lb)
- Predecessor: iPad Air 2
- Successor: iPad Pro (2nd generation)
- Related: Apple Pencil, Apple A9X
- Website: www.apple.com/ipad-pro/ at the Wayback Machine (archived April 6, 2016)

The first-generation iPad Pro is a line of iPad and a tablet computer developed and marketed by Apple. The iPad Pro was released in 2015 alongside the Apple Pencil, and was the first iPad to use the Pencil as an input device.

The iPad Pro was first sold in November 2015 at a screen size of 12.9 inches, larger than all previous iPad models. A smaller 9.7 inch model, based on the form factor of the iPad Air 2, was released in March 2016. The 12.9 inch model was the first iPad to feature LPDDR4 RAM. The iPad Pro (1st generation) was discontinued on June 5, 2017.

== Features ==
The 12.9-inch version of the iPad Pro was announced during an Apple Special Event on September 9, 2015. It was released on November 11, 2015, with silver, gold, and space gray color options. Prices ranged from US$799 to $1,229, based on storage size and cellular connectivity.

On March 21, 2016, the 9.7-inch version of the iPad Pro was announced at an Apple keynote with an additional rose gold color option. The 9.7-inch version also introduced the ability to choose the base 32 GB model with a Cellular + WiFi option. Previously, Cellular + WiFi option was only available on 128 GB iPad Pro models. The 9.7-inch model is priced from $599 to $1,129 depending on the configuration. It was released on March 31, 2016.

The 9.7-inch iPad Pro has a faster CPU and a better camera than the iPad Air 2. It is the first iPad to feature True Tone Flash and Retina Flash, and its 256 GB storage option was the highest for an iPad at the time. Its True Tone display allows the LCD to adapt its color and intensity to ambient lighting.

Both iPad Pro models include the A9X chip and the Apple M9 motion co-processor. Several features are carried over from the standard iPad, such as Touch ID and the Retina Display. New features include a smart connector for a keyboard and four stereo speakers located in pairs on top and bottom of the device. The 12.9-inch model has a 2732-by-2048 display and the 9.7-inch model has a 2048-by-1536 display. Both displays have a resolution of 264 pixels per inch and feature a variable refresh rate, a first for Apple. The 12.9-inch version is also the first iOS device to include more than 2 GB of RAM.

A customized 12.9 inch iPad Pro was also designed by Jony Ive and submitted to Phillips's Time for Design auction. The special edition iPad Pro has an "Edition 1 of 1" label engraved on its back and comes with a custom yellow-gold anodized finish, a blue leather Smart Cover and an orange leather Apple Pencil case cover, all of which are not sold by Apple elsewhere. The special edition sold for £50,000.

== Software ==
Both iPad Pro (1st generation) models supported iOS 9, 10, 11, 12, iPadOS 13, 14, 15, 16, and do not support iPadOS 17 due to hardware limitations.

== Reception ==
Scott Stein from CNET praised the faster processor and new accessories available. However, he criticized the cost of both the unit and its accessories, while noting its less RAM of the 9.7-inch model compared to the larger 12.9-inch model. Matt Swider from TechRadar complimented the easy handling, large 256 GB configuration and True Tone display, but was upset about the high starting price. Gareth Beavis gave a positive review, commending the expansive screen and audio quality but stated that the battery life could be made longer.

== Timeline ==
Timeline of iPad models
See also: List of Apple products

Source: Apple Newsroom Archive.

== Gallery ==
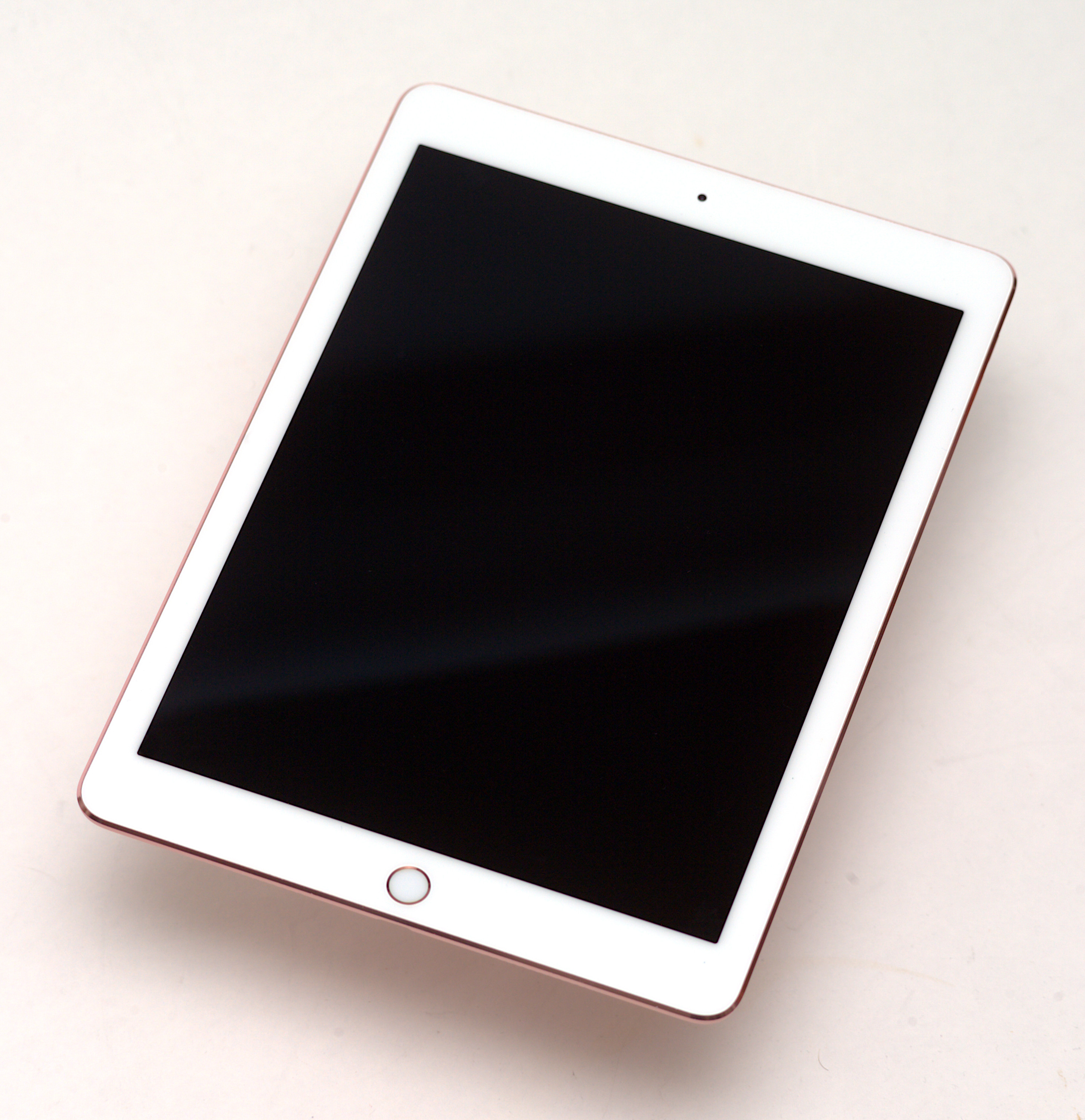
First-generation 9.7-inch iPad Pro in rose gold

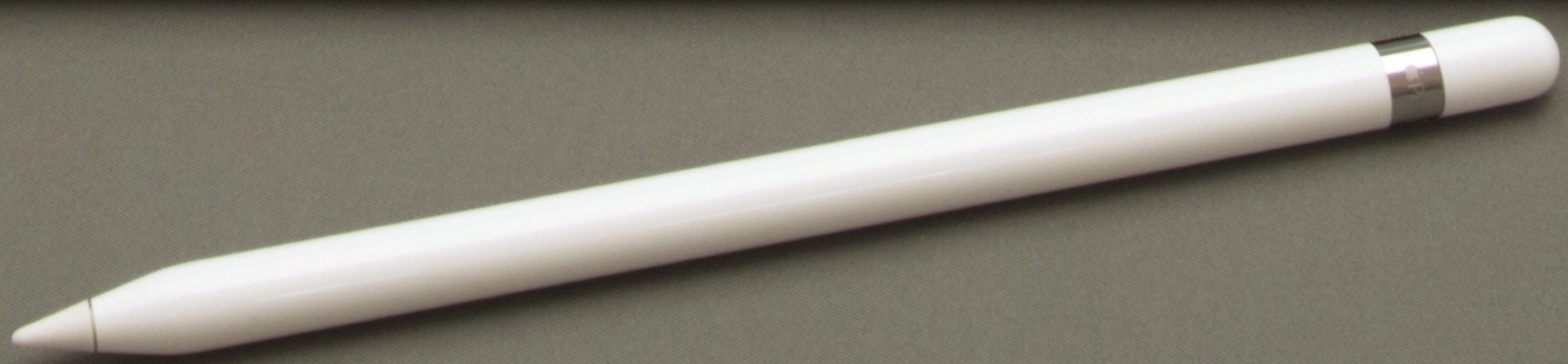
First-generation Apple Pencil

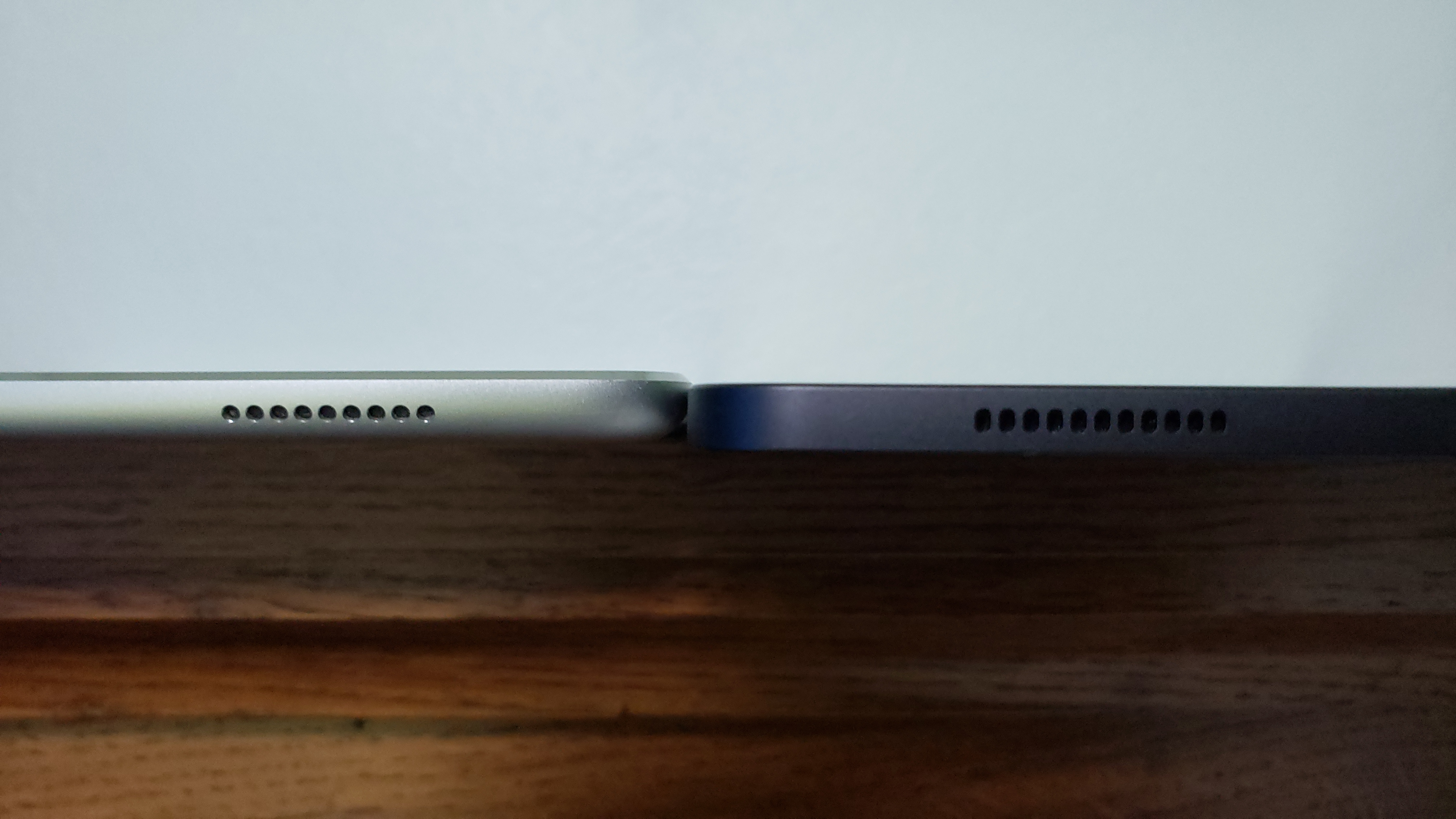
Thickness of the 6.9mm iPad Pro 12.9 1st generation (left) with the 5.5mm Samsung Galaxy Tab S8 Ultra (right) for comparison

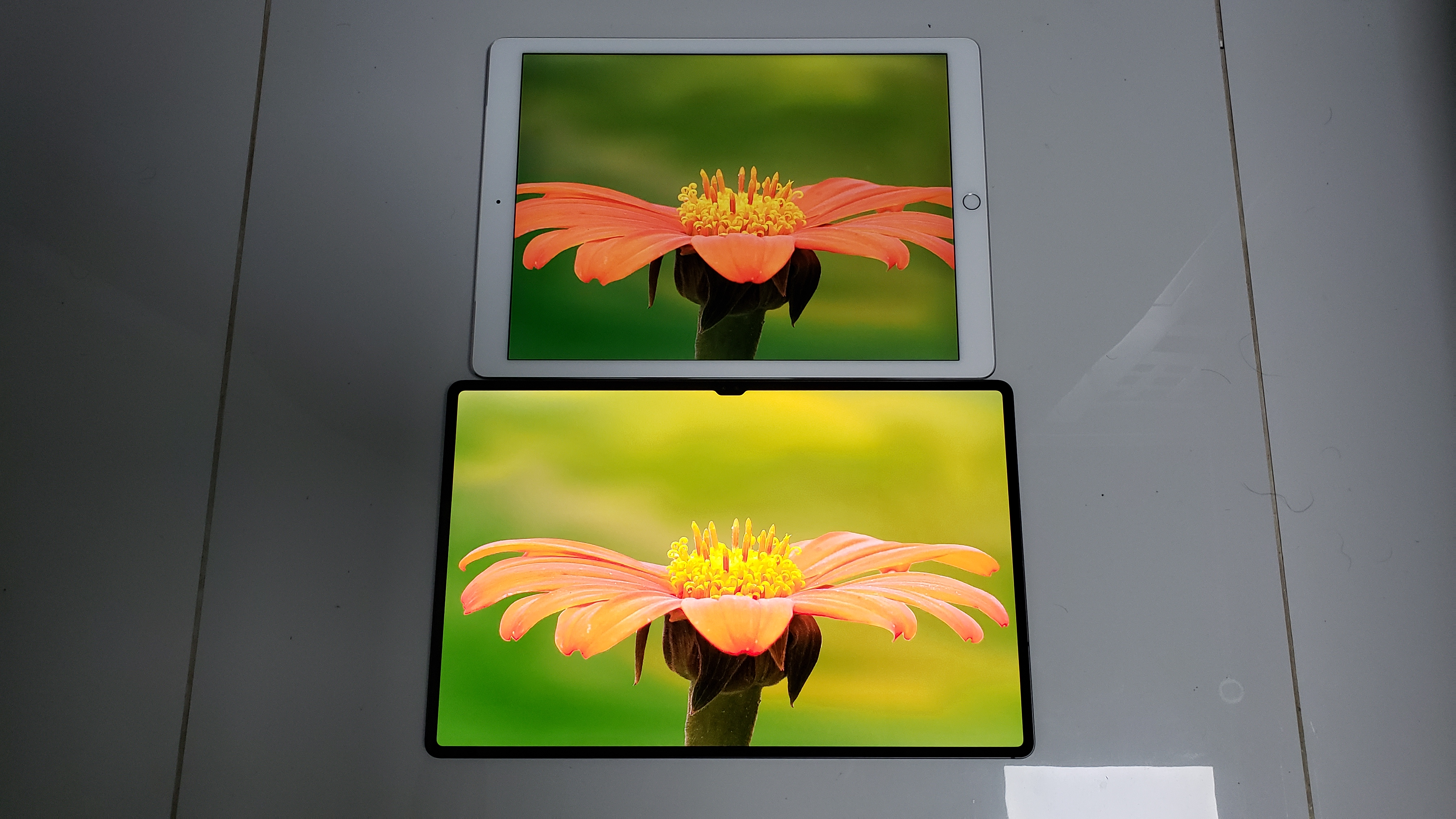
Comparison of the iPad Pro 12.9 1st generation's and the Samsung Galaxy Tab S8 Ultra's size and display brightness

== See also ==
- Pen computing
- Graphics tablet
