= IPad 2 =

Tablet computer developed by Apple (2011–2016)

iPad 2

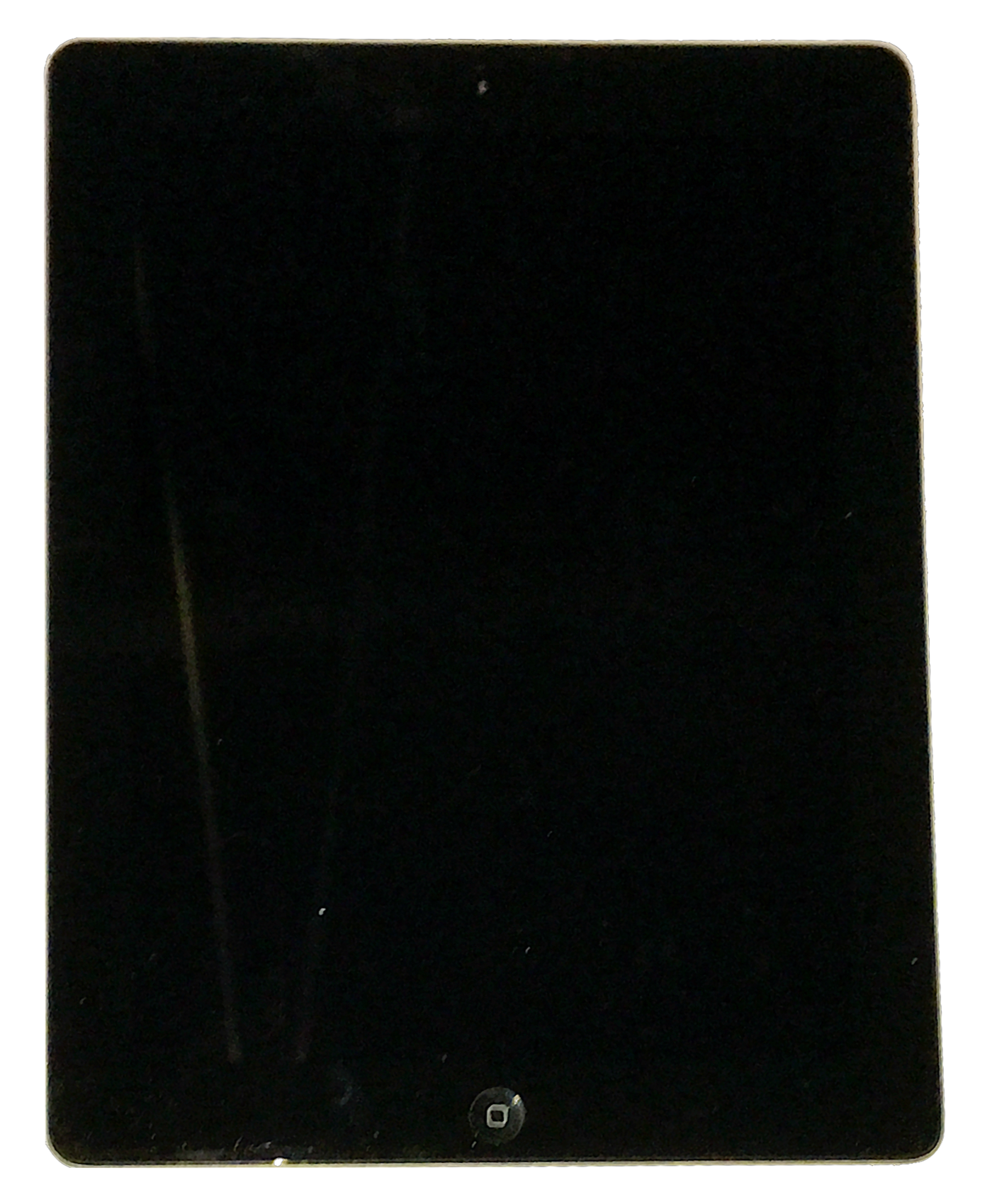
- iPad 2 in Black
- Developer: Apple
- Manufacturer: Foxconn
- Product family: iPad
- Type: Tablet computer
- Generation: 2nd
- Released: March 11, 2011: United States; Puerto Rico (USA); March 25, 2011: Australia; Austria; Belgium; Canada; Czech Republic; Denmark; Finland; France; Germany; Greece; Hungary; Iceland; Italy; Ireland; Luxembourg; Mexico; Netherlands; New Zealand; Norway; Poland; Portugal; Spain; Sweden; Switzerland; United Kingdom; April 29, 2011: Japan; Hong Kong; India; Israel; Macau; Malaysia; Philippines; Singapore; South Africa; South Korea; Turkey; United Arab Emirates; May 6, 2011: China; Croatia; Estonia; Latvia; Lithuania; Slovenia; Thailand; May 27, 2011: Colombia; Brazil; Peru; Russia; Taiwan; Ukraine; July 15, 2011: Indonesia
- Lifespan: 2011–2014
- Introductory price: US$499
- Discontinued: 32 GB and 64 GB: March 7, 2012; 16 GB: March 18, 2014
- Operating system: Original: iOS 4.3; Last: Wi-Fi only & Wi-Fi + Cellular (GSM) models: iOS 9.3.5, released August 25, 2016; Wi-Fi + Cellular (CDMA) model: iOS 9.3.6, released July 22, 2019
- System on a chip: Apple A5
- CPU: 1 GHz dual-core ARM Cortex-A9
- Memory: 512 MB DDR2 (1066 MHz RAM)
- Storage: 16 GB, 32 GB and 64 GB (Flash memory)
- Display: 9.7 inches (250 mm), 4:3, 132 ppi Resolution: 1024×768 px (XGA) (1080p – video out via Apple Digital AV Adapter; support simultaneous charging)
- Graphics: PowerVR SGX543MP2; 67 MPolygon/s; 2 GPixel/s fill rate
- Sound: Frequency response: 20 Hz to 20,000 Hz; Audio Formats: HE-AAC (V1 and V2), AAC (8 to 320 kbit/s), Protected AAC (from iTunes Store), MP3 (8 to 320 kbit/s), MP3 VBR, Audible (formats 2, 3 & 4, AEA, AAX, and AAX+), Apple Lossless, AIFF, and WAV; support 5.1 Dolby Digital Surround pass-through
- Input: Multi-touch touch screen, headset controls, proximity and ambient light sensors, three-axis gyroscope, microphone, magnetometer, accelerometer, assisted GPS + cellular (3G model only), micro-SIM card tray (3G-GSM model only)
- Camera: Front: Video recording, VGA up to 30 frame/s with audio, VGA-quality still camera, 0.3 MP. Back: Video recording, 1280x720 up to 30 frame/s with audio, 960×720 still camera with 5× digital zoom, 0.7 MP.
- Connectivity: Wi-Fi (802.11 a/b/g/n); Bluetooth 2.1 + EDR; Wi-Fi + 3G GSM model also includes: UMTS/HSDPA
- Power: Internal rechargeable non-removable 3.8 V 25 W·h (6,944 mA·h)
- Online services: iTunes Store, App Store, iBookstore, Game Center, iCloud
- Dimensions: 9.50 in (241 mm) (height); 7.31 in (186 mm) (width); 0.345 in (8.8 mm) (depth)
- Weight: Wi-Fi model: 1.33 lb (600 g); Wi-Fi + 3G model (GSM): 1.35 lb (610 g)
- Predecessor: iPad (1st generation)
- Successor: iPad (3rd generation)
- Related: iPad, iPhone, iPod Touch (comparison)
- Website: www.apple.com/ipad/ at the Wayback Machine (archived July 19, 2011)

The iPad 2 is a tablet computer developed and marketed by Apple. Compared to the first iPad, it gained a faster dual core A5 processor, a lighter build structure with a flat, rather than curved back, and was the first iPad to feature VGA front-facing and 720p rear-facing cameras designed for FaceTime video calling. The device was available initially with three storage sizes – 16, 32 and 64 GB – and two connectivity options – Wi-Fi only or Wi-Fi + Cellular. Each variation of the device is available with either a black or white front glass panel. The iPad 2 shipped with iOS 4.

The iPad 2 was first released on March 11, 2011, in the United States, and in other countries throughout March–May 2011. The device received generally positive reception from various blogs and publications. Although it was praised for its hardware improvement, such as the new Apple A5 chip, the software restriction on the iPad 2 and iOS in general drew criticism from various technology commentators. The device sold well in its first month of sales with 2.4–2.6 million units sold and 11.12 million units were sold in the third quarter of 2011.

Following the release of the iPad (3rd generation) in 2012, the 16 GB model remained in the iPad lineup as an entry-level iPad model for three years until March 2014. The iPad 2 received updates up to iOS 9. The iPad 2's design formed the core of the first iPad Mini, which had the same screen pixel count, chip, and similar features at a smaller size.

== History ==
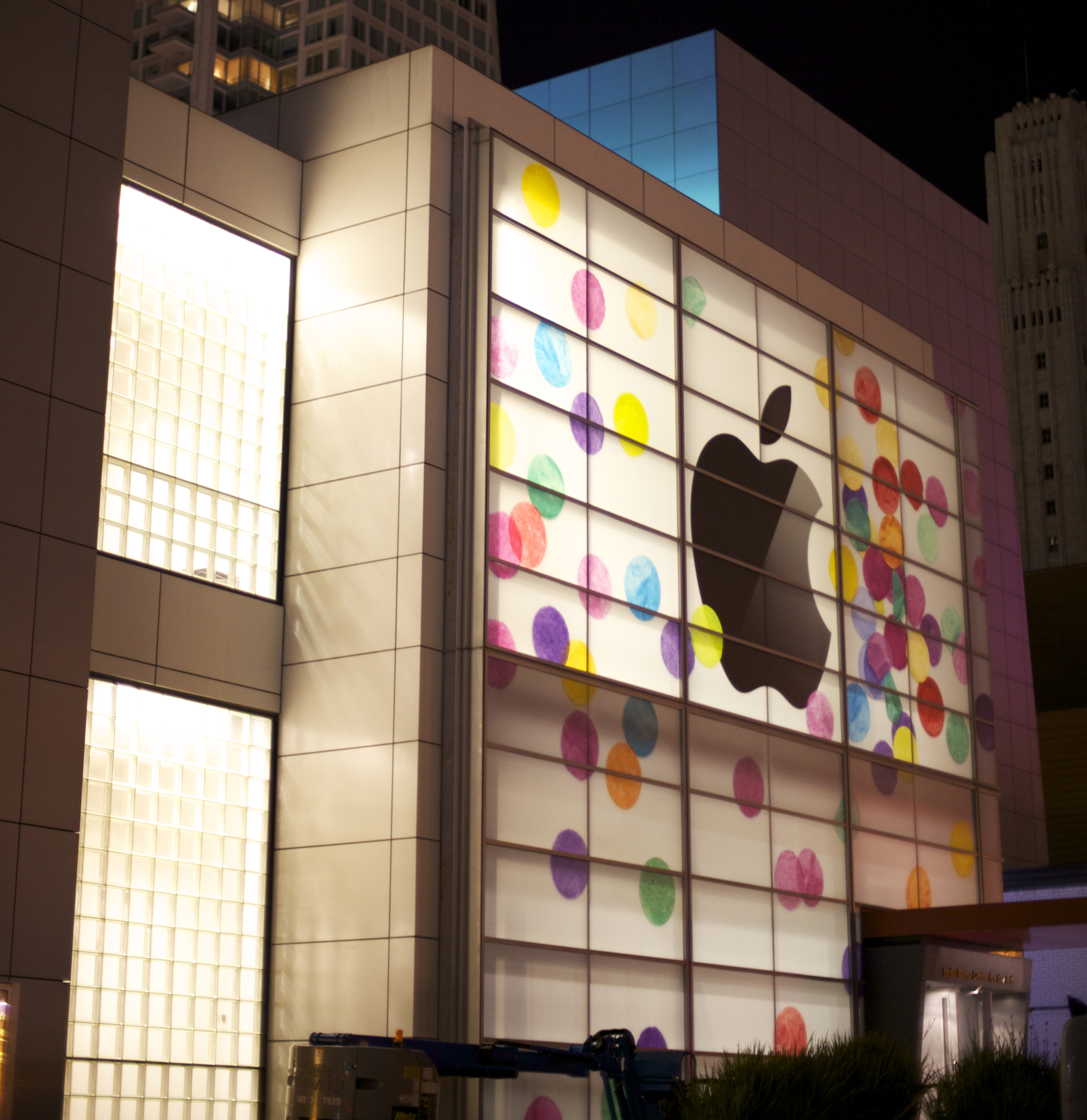
The iPad 2 was announced at the Yerba Buena Center for the Arts on March 2, 2011.

Apple sent invitations to journalists on February 23, 2011, for a media event on March 2. On March 2, 2011, CEO Steve Jobs unveiled the device at the Yerba Buena Center for the Arts, despite being on medical leave. Upon the announcement of the iPad 2, the original iPad was discontinued from sales online and at physical Apple Stores and authorized resellers.

Apple began selling the iPad 2 on its website on March 11, and in its U.S. retail stores at 5 pm local time on that date. Many stores in major cities, such as New York, sold out within hours. Online shipping delays had increased to three to four weeks on Sunday and four to five weeks by Tuesday.

The iPad 2 was released internationally in 25 other countries on March 25, 2011. The countries included Australia, Austria, Belgium, Canada, Czech Republic, Denmark, Finland, France, Germany, Greece, Iceland, Italy, Ireland, Hungary, Luxembourg, Mexico, Netherlands, New Zealand, Norway, Poland, Portugal, Spain, Sweden, Switzerland, and the United Kingdom.

The April 29, 2011 release date for Japan was postponed due to the earthquake and tsunami which struck the nation on March 11, 2011. The iPads were delayed due to the NAND flash storage chip used in the iPads being created by Toshiba, which was affected by the earthquake and tsunami thus resulting in the suspension of operations for an indefinite period of time. The slowdown caused analysts to downgrade Apple's stock.

The iPad 2 was later released in Hong Kong, India, South Korea, Singapore, Philippines, Malaysia and other countries including Japan on April 29, 2011. It was then released in numerous other nations which include China, Estonia, Thailand, Brazil, Russia and Taiwan on two major release dates, May 6 and 27.

The 32 and 64GB models were discontinued on March 7, 2012, upon the introduction of the third generation iPad. The 16GB Wi-Fi and 16GB Wi-Fi + 3G models were discontinued on March 18, 2014.

== Features ==
=== Software ===
The iPad 2 initially shipped with iOS 4.3. The iPad 2 comes with several applications by default, including Safari, Mail, Photos, Videos, Music, iTunes Store, Maps, Notes, Calendar, Photo Booth, and Contacts. The App Store, a digital app distribution for iOS, allows users to download more applications, such as those created using the iOS SDK, or more Apple applications such as GarageBand, iMovie, and the iWork apps (Pages, Keynote, and Numbers). Like all iOS devices, the iPad 2 can sync music, videos, apps and photos with a Mac or PC using iTunes, although when using iOS 5 and later, the user does not have to connect the iPad to the computer. iCloud also allows users to backup and sync their data with other compatible iOS devices via the internet. Game Center is available as a native social gaming platform on iOS, games downloaded via the App Store that have this feature enabled are able to integrate their achievement points, high-scores and bonus system across all iOS devices into a single accumulative points and social platform. Although the tablet is not designed to make phone calls over a cellular network, a user can use a wired headset or the built-in speaker and microphone and place phone calls over Wi-Fi or cellular using a VoIP application.

On October 12, 2011, upon the release of the iPhone 4s, the iPad 2 was upgradable to the iOS 5, which brought over 200 new user features to iOS compatible devices including Notification Center, iMessage, Reminders, and an updated notifications system, using a new "banner" style instead of the previously used pop-up "alert" style.

On September 19, 2012, shortly after the announcement of the iPhone 5, the iPad 2 was upgradeable to iOS 6, which contains two hundred new features, including Apple Maps, the Clock app, and Facebook integration among other new features and tweaks.

The iPad 2 is also compatible with iOS 7, albeit with limited features. For example, like the iPhone 4, the Notification Center and the Control Center use the transparent style instead of the translucent style in later iOS models. AirDrop, which was first released in iOS 7, requires the iPad (4th generation) or later.

The iPad 2 can run iOS 8, making it the first iOS device to run five major versions of iOS. Like iOS 7, many features are not available, and the update was criticized for running slower than its predecessor.

The iPad 2 can also run iOS 9. As with previous releases, though, several features were unavailable on the iPad 2, including Siri, translucency effects, split-view, slide-over and picture-in-picture multitasking and the Health app.

On June 13, 2016, with the announcement of iOS 10, Apple dropped support for the iPad 2 due to hardware limitations and performance issues. On July 22, 2019, Apple released iOS 9.3.6 for the CDMA model of the iPad 2 to fix issues caused by the GPS week number rollover. The issues would impact accuracy of GPS location and set the device's date and time to an incorrect value.

==== "Broadpwn" exploit vulnerability ====
The iPad 2 is one of many computers, tablets, and mobile devices susceptible to the "Broadpwn" exploit, which was publicized in July 2017. Apple quickly released an update for iOS 10 to fix the problem, but a fix was never released for iOS 9 or earlier versions of iOS. As a result, older Apple devices incompatible with iOS 10, including the iPad 2, were left vulnerable indefinitely. This has raised concerns of potentially widespread attacks using the exploit, particularly in locations of concentrated iPad 2 deployment, such as certain primary and secondary schools.

=== Hardware ===
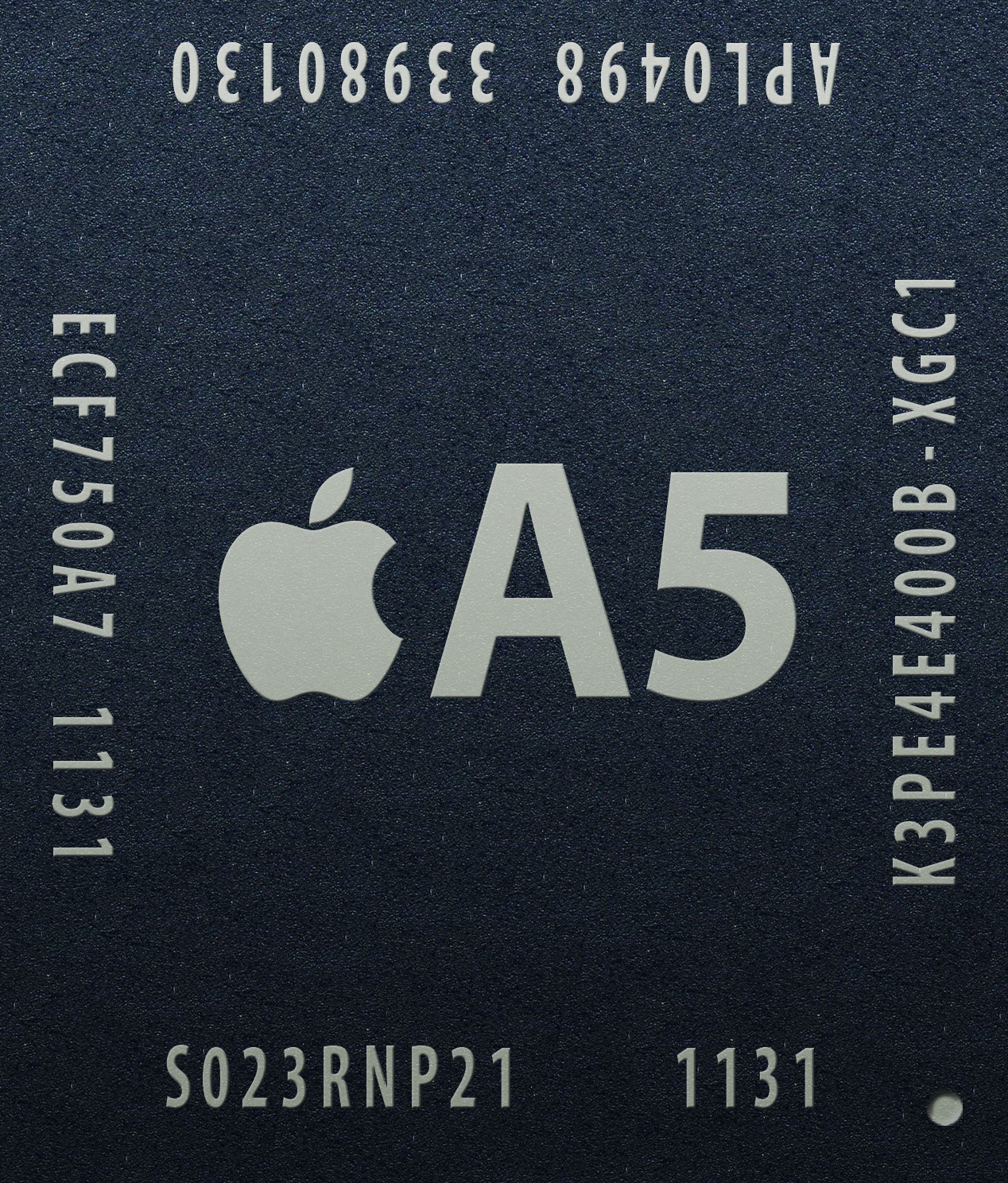
Apple A5 chip used in the iPad 2

The iPad 2 features an Apple A5 package-on-package (PoP) System-on-chip (SoC), which comprises a 1 GHz dual-core 32-bit Cortex-A9 CPU, 512 MB of RAM and a dual-core PowerVR SGX543MP2 GPU. Other features include front and rear cameras, a three-axis gyroscope, headset controls, proximity and ambient light sensors, microphone, magnetometer, accelerometer and a 9.7 inch multi-touch screen with a maximum resolution of 1024×768 hence resulting in 132 ppi. The iPad 2 has four physical switches, including a home button near the display that returns the user to the home screen, and three plastic physical switches on the sides: wake/sleep, volume up/down, and a third switch for either screen rotation lock or mute. The home button on the iPad 2 is "easier to double tap" than the previous generation of the iPad. Apple reduced the size of the iPad by eliminating the stamped sheet metal frame from the display, integrating new thinner glass technology for the touch screen overlay, and slightly reducing the space between the display and battery. The iPad 2's screen is thinner, lighter, and yet stronger than the original iPad's. The iPad 2 also supports screen mirroring via the digital AV adapter and through AirPlay as of iOS 5.

The iPad 2 has a 25 W·h rechargeable lithium-ion polymer battery that lasts 10 hours, like the original iPad. It is charged via USB or included 10 W, 2 A power adapter. The battery is 2.5 mm thick, 59% smaller than the original and has three cells instead of two. The improvements allowed the injection-molded plastic support frame to be omitted. The 10 W USB power adapter provides 4x the power of a conventional USB port. The tablet has an audio frequency response of 20 Hz to 20 kHz. Without third-party software it can play the following audio formats: HE-AAC, AAC, Protected AAC, MP3, MP3 VBR, Audible formats (2, 3, 4, AEA, AAX, and AAX+), ALAC, AIFF, and WAV.

The revised tablet adds front- and rear-facing cameras, which allow FaceTime video calls with other iPad 2s, the third generation iPad, iPhone 4 and 4s, fourth-generation iPod Touch and Macintosh computers (running Mac OS X 10.6.6 or later with a webcam). The 0.3 MP front camera shoots VGA-quality 30 frame/s video and VGA-quality still photos. The 0.7 MP back camera can shoot 720p HD video at 30 frame/s and has a 5× times digital zoom. Both shoot photo in a 4:3 fullscreen aspect ratio. The rear camera shoots video in 16:9 widescreen to match the 720p standard, although only the central 4:3 part of the recording is shown on the screen during recording. The forward-facing camera shoots in 4:3.

The Apple A5 chip doubles processing speed and has graphics processing that is up to nine times faster than the previous iPad. However, benchtests and hardware assessments performed by various third party news sources and technology blogs indicate that those claims are exaggerated; the benchmark assessment conducted by Anandtech showed that the GPU of the iPad 2 is only 3 times faster than that of the original iPad. CPU benchmarks conducted on the iPad 2 by iOSnoops indicate a 66% performance increase compared to the original iPad.

3G versions of the iPad 2 offer CDMA2000 support for customers using the device on a CDMA network or GSM/UMTS support for customers using the device on a GSM/UMTS network. The iPad Wi-Fi + 3G model includes an A-GPS receiver for tracking the user's location given permission. Also, the iPad 2 3G model includes a plastic cap-like band at the top on the back for the 3G antenna. The metallic grille for the microphone is replaced with a matching plastic black grille on the 3G model. GSM models of iPad 2 use a SIM card while CDMA models use an ESN to connect to the cellular network.

The device is 15% lighter and 33% thinner than the original iPad; it is thinner than the iPhone 4 by 0.5 mm. The Wi-Fi version is 1.33 lb (600 g). Both the GSM and CDMA versions (known respectively as the AT&T and Verizon versions in the US) differ in weight slightly due to the mass difference between the GSM and CDMA cellular radios, with the GSM model at 1.35 lb (612 g) and the CDMA model at 1.34 lb (608 g). The size of the iPad 2 is also less than the original iPad at only 9.50 in ×7.31 in ×0.34 in (241.2 mm ×185.7 mm ×8.8 mm), compared to the original iPad's size at 9.56 in ×7.47 in ×0.5 in (242.8 mm ×189.7 mm ×13.4 mm).

After the announcement and release of the third generation iPad, the iPad 2, which continued to be available for purchase, received a hardware upgrade. The upgraded variant of the iPad 2 features a smaller version of the Apple A5 SoC, which is able to reduce battery consumption. Benchmark tests conducted by Anandtech concluded that the upgraded variant is able to last longer by at least an hour and a half, depending on the task that is conducted on the device. The maximum temperature that the device heated up to was also less than original iPad 2, tests conducted by the same organisation revealed that the upgraded variant was able to operate at 1 degree lower when performing intensive tasks. Performance difference between the two variants, according to Anandtech is negligible.

=== Accessories ===
The Smart Cover, first introduced with the iPad 2, is a screen protector that magnetically attaches to the face of the iPad. The cover has three folds which allow it to convert into a stand, which is also held together by magnets. While original iPad owners could purchase a black case that included a similarly folding cover, the Smart Cover is meant to be more minimal, easily detachable, and protects only the screen. Smart Covers have a microfiber bottom that cleans the front of the iPad, and wakes up the iPad when the cover is removed. There are five different colors of both polyurethane and leather, with leather being more expensive than the polyurethane version.

Apple offered several more accessories for the iPad 2, most of which were adapters for the proprietary 30-pin dock connector, the iPad's only port besides the headphone jack. A dock holds the iPad upright at an angle, and has a dock connector and audio line out port. The iPad can use Bluetooth keyboards that also work with Macs and PCs. The iPad can be charged by a standalone power adapter ("wall charger") also used for contemporary iPods and iPhones, and a 10 W charger was included with the iPad.

== Reception ==
The iPad 2 received generally positive reviews, praising its Apple A5 processor and 720p camera. Joshua Topolsky of Engadget said that "for those of you who haven't yet made the leap, feel free to take a deep breath and dive in – the iPad 2 is as good as it gets right now. And it's really quite good." Jason Snell of Macworld said the following:

"Though the iPad 2 is an improvement on the original iPad in numerous ways, it's still an evolutionary product, not a revolutionary one. If you're happy with your current iPad, there's no reason to dump it just because there's a shinier, newer one. (This is not to say that millions of people won't do just that. I mean: shiny!) If you've invested in iPad accessories such as a dock or case, keep in mind that you probably won't be able to use them with the new iPad."

TechCrunch's MG Siegler stated: "Let me sum all of this up in a simple way: the iPad 2, should you buy one? Maybe — it depends on a few factors. Will you want to buy one? Yes. Use that information wisely."

=== Criticism ===
The closed and proprietary nature of iOS has garnered criticism, particularly by digital rights advocates such as the Electronic Frontier Foundation, computer engineer and activist Brewster Kahle, Internet-law specialist Jonathan Zittrain, and the Free Software Foundation who protested the iPad's introductory event and have targeted the iPad with their "Defective by Design" campaign. Competitor Microsoft, via a PR spokesman, has also criticized Apple's control over its platform.

=== Technical problems ===
At issue are restrictions imposed by the design of iOS, namely DRM intended to lock purchased media to Apple's platform, the development model (requiring a yearly subscription to distribute apps developed for the iOS), the centralized approval process for apps, as well as Apple's general control and lockdown of the platform itself. Particularly at issue is the ability for Apple to remotely disable or delete apps at will. Some in the tech community have expressed concern that the locked-down iOS represents a growing trend in Apple's approach to computing, particularly Apple's shift away from machines that hobbyists can "tinker with" and note the potential for such restrictions to stifle software innovation.

Some iPad 2 users reported performance issues when running iOS 8. Apple improved performance on the iPad 2 and the iPhone 4S on the iOS 8.1.1 update.

=== Commercial reception ===
During the first weekend of sale, more than one million units were sold. Soon after the first weekend, Ashok Kumar, a technology analyst for a financial firm predicted that Apple would sell 35 million iPad 2s in 2011. Investment banking firm, Piper Jaffray monitored the initial sales of the iPad 2 and reported that 70% of all iPad 2 sales were to first-time iPad buyers with 49% of buyers owning a PC compared to the initial buyers of the original iPad where only 26% of buyers owned a PC. 12,000 units were sold on auction site eBay in its first two weeks of release. When the iPhone 4S was released, rumors about the third generation iPad caused a decline in iPad 2 sales. Official figures released in the fourth quarter of 2011 indicate that Apple sold 11.4 million iPads in the third quarter, a 166% increase from the third quarter of 2010. The product helped create newer, larger markets for Apple in south east Asia.

=== In space ===
In 2011 two iPad 2 tablets were taken to the International Space Station after being approved. Other Apple products that were taken to ISS include the iPod and also two iPhone 4 phones. The other personal computing system aboard ISS were various versions of the ThinkPad laptop (IBM, later Lenovo brand).

Some of the applications the iPads were used for include the ISS FIT (International Space Station Food Intake Tracker) for tracking astronauts' food consumption.

== See also ==
- iPad accessories
- E-book reader
- Comparison of tablet computers

Preceded by iPad (1st generation)	iPad 2; 2011	Succeeded by iPad (3rd generation)
