= IOS 9 =

2015 mobile operating system

iOS 9
- Version of the iOS operating system
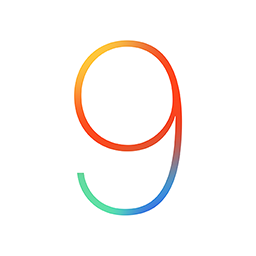

- iOS 9 home screen on an iPhone 6s
- Developer: Apple Inc.
- Working state: No longer supported
- Source model: Closed, with open source components
- Initial release: September 16, 2015; 11 years ago
- Latest release: 9.3.6 (13G37) / July 22, 2019; 7 years ago
- Update method: Software Update
- Package manager: App Store (Apple)
- Supported platforms: iPhone, iPod Touch, iPad
- Kernel type: Hybrid (XNU)
- License: Proprietary EULA except for open-source components
- Preceded by: iOS 8
- Succeeded by: iOS 10
- Official website: iOS 9 – Apple at the Wayback Machine (archived September 6, 2016)
- Tagline: The most advanced mobile experience. Now even more so.

Support status
- Obsolete, unsupported as of March 2022

iOS 9 is the ninth major release of the iOS mobile operating system developed by Apple Inc., being the successor to iOS 8. It was announced at the company's Worldwide Developers Conference on June 8, 2015, and was released on September 16, 2015. It was succeeded by iOS 10 on September 13, 2016.

iOS 9 incorporated many feature updates to built-in apps. Most notably, Notes received the ability to draw sketches with different tools, image insertion, prominent visual appearance for website links and map locations, and advanced list formatting; an all-new Apple News app aggregates articles from different sources; and Apple Maps received mass transit support, although in a limited number of locations at launch. Major new system updates include proactivity, where Siri and advanced search are combined to make the operating system more contextually aware of information (such as time and location), and can provide the user with information ahead of time. For searching, the proactive intelligence can display instant results in a widget-like format, including weather, sports, news, and more. iOS 9 also added multiple forms of multitasking to the iPad. In iOS 9.3, Apple added a Night Shift mode that changes the color of the device's display to a warmer, less "blue light" containing shade, to reduce any negative eye health effects on users' circadian rhythms. Additionally, iOS 9 brought new user experience functions, including Quick Actions, and Peek and Pop, based on the pressure-sensitive display technology in the iPhone 6s. Quick Actions are shortcuts on home screen app icons. Users can preview ("Peek") at content without moving away from the current screen before they enter ("Pop") the previewed content into full view.

Reception of iOS 9 was positive. Critics praised proactivity and Siri for making the Notification Center a central location for all information, and the potential for future updates to improve the functionality. The new multitasking features for the iPad were complimented, as were drawing and photo insertion in the Notes app. However, Apple News was criticized for a low number of decent-looking articles, and Apple Maps was criticized for the limited geographical availability of mass transit support.

Five days after release, Apple announced that iOS 9 had been installed on more than 50% of "active" iOS devices, which Apple described as the "fastest adoption rate ever for a new operating system".

iOS 9 is the final version of iOS to feature the classic slide-to-unlock gesture. With the release of iOS 10, Apple introduced the Today view, which was accessed on the lock screen by swiping to the right. Apple removed slide-to-unlock in iOS 10 because it would create confusion when users were trying to unlock their phone by sliding the screen, but instead of unlocking the phone, it took them to the new Today view. iOS 9 is the final version of iOS compatible with devices with the 30-pin dock connector, including the iPhone 4s, iPad 2, and iPad (3rd generation). It is also the final version of iOS that supports the iPad Mini (1st generation) and the last 32-bit iPod Touch, the iPod Touch (5th generation). iOS 9's successor, iOS 10, drops support for devices with A5 or A5X chips.

== Overview ==
iOS 9.3 Home screen on a 9.7-inch iPad Pro (1st generation)

iOS 9 was introduced at the Apple Worldwide Developers Conference on June 8, 2015, with the first beta version made available to registered developers after the keynote, and a public beta made available in July.

This marked the first time that the general public had been able to test new versions of iOS before official release, with Eddy Cue, Apple's Senior Vice President of Internet Software and Services, telling Fast Company that the public beta program was started "because of Maps", referring to the company's Apple Maps launch that had significant issues in its early days.

iOS 9 was officially released on September 16, 2015.

== System features ==
=== 3D Touch ===
On the iPhone 6s and iPhone 6s Plus, a touch-sensitive display feature called 3D Touch is incorporated into iOS 9. It is similar to Force Touch, which can be found on the trackpad of some Apple MacBook computers. Quick Actions and shortcuts are added to apps that support the 3D Touch feature and are triggered by pressing slightly harder on the app icon. It also introduces actions known as Peek and Pop, which lets users firmly hold to preview ("Peek") any kind of content in a hovering window, before they optionally apply more pressure to enter ("Pop") the content into full view.

The taptic engine in the iPhone 6S provides haptic feedback each time users press the screen harder.

=== Battery ===
iOS 9 introduces two important battery-saving updates. When a phone is placed face-down, the screen will not wake for notifications. Apple also added Low Power Mode, which restricts the amount of energy consumed by limiting background services such as background app refresh and push email, limiting animations, as well as lowering screen brightness, screen refresh rate, and volume. When the battery level reaches 20% users are prompted to enable Low Power Mode. When charging, Low Power Mode is automatically disabled once the battery level reaches 80%. While enabled, Low Power Mode changes the color of the battery icon in the status bar to yellow.

=== Design ===
San Francisco, a new system font, replaced Helvetica Neue as the system typeface of iOS.

iOS 9 added a new battery widget to the Notification Center that displays the battery life and charging status of any connected Bluetooth device.

When the shift button is inactive, lowercase letters are displayed on the keyboard, instead of the all-caps representation on previous iOS versions.

=== Installation ===
iOS 9 is a smaller update than iOS 8, requiring just 1.3 GB of space, compared to 4.58 GB for iOS 8. Additionally, iOS 9 includes an option to temporarily delete apps to allow the update to install. Once the update has been installed, the apps will be automatically reinstalled from the App Store. iOS 9 also features "app thinning" functionality, whereby only the necessary assets needed to run apps on each individual device is downloaded rather than the entire app, potentially saving space. For example, with the new app thinning technology, when a user downloads a new app onto their new iPhone 6S, the download would only include the images and data that are required on that device, so that no space is required for the images and data that would not be used on the device.

=== Multitasking ===
For the first time, iOS 9 adds a number of features to the iPad to improve productivity. These include Slide Over, Split Screen, and Picture in Picture, for enhanced multitasking, similar to the experience found on OS X El Capitan. Slide Over allows the user to pull in a second app with a swipe from the right edge of the display. This app takes up 1/3 of the screen and sticks to the right side of the screen, while interactivity within the full-screen app is disabled while left inactive in the background. The feature allows users to perform quick tasks and then dismiss the app again.

If the user taps on the handle next to the Slide Over window or extends the window further towards the left of the screen, the user enters Split Screen, which allows them to interact with two apps simultaneously side-by-side in a 50/50 split. Users can also switch to another app in either Slide Over mode or Split Screen view by pulling down on the handle on top of either app and selecting another app from the list to replace the existing one.

Picture in Picture mode allows users to minimize FaceTime calls or supported videos to a smaller window and continue watching them while doing other tasks on the iPad.

The Split Screen multitasking feature is only available for iPad Air 2, iPad mini 4, and iPad Pro, while the Slide Over and Picture in Picture features are available on the iPad Air, iPad Air 2, iPad mini 2 and newer, and the iPad Pro.

When banner notifications are tapped, causing another app to open, a back button at the top-left corner of the screen has been added, bringing the user back to the previous app.

On iPhone, iOS 9 changed appearance of its app switcher from side-by-side view in iOS 8 to card-like view.

=== Night Shift ===
Night Shift is a display mode introduced in iOS 9.3. The mode shifts the colors of the device's display to be warmer, similar to F.lux, a popular program for Microsoft Windows and Apple macOS computers. When enabled, it uses the device's clock and geographic location to determine when to turn the feature on or off. Optionally, the user can set a manual schedule, or not have a schedule at all. For ease of access, there is a new Night Shift toggle in the Control Center. The settings for Night Shift are located under "Display and Brightness" in the Settings app, and on top of enabling the feature and setting a schedule, the user can also set the warmth of the display.

Despite being introduced in iOS 9.3 in March 2016, it wasn't possible to use Night Shift and Low Power Mode simultaneously until the release of iOS 9.3.2 two months later. Night Shift requires a 64-bit processor only found in the Apple A7 or newer chips, which means older iOS devices, including the iPhone 4s, iPhone 5, iPhone 5c, iPad 2, iPad 3, iPad 4, first-generation iPad Mini, and 5th generation iPod Touch, do not receive Night Shift mode.

=== Performance ===
iOS 9 includes performance and speed improvements thanks to the expanded use of the Metal API. Metal was introduced in iOS 8 and was previously limited to game developers. In iOS 9, the use of Metal is expanded to let it handle many of the core user interface elements and graphics.

=== Proactivity ===
Intelligence is one of the main features in iOS 9, consisting of the newly integrated Siri and Search (previously known as Spotlight), as well as "proactivity" throughout the operating system. iOS is now more aware of contextual information (such as time and location), and proactively provides the user with what they may need in advance to save them time and effort. When typing, Search has also been improved to display instant answers in an at-a-glance, widget-like format, similar to that provided in the Siri interface. Search can display current weather, sports scores, news, and more. The Search screen with proactive suggestions can be accessed either by pulling down the notifications window, in the Safari web browser through the search bar, and to the left on the home screen.

The intelligence also extends into apps. For instance, in Mail, events can be automatically added to Calendar if details are found in the message content, and likely additional recipients are suggested during message composition. Siri is also aware of what is currently on screen when it is engaged by holding down the home button.

=== Security ===
iOS 9 introduces multiple security enhancements. It introduces a 6-digit passcode as a default, an extra two digits over the previous 4-digit default, as well as support for two-factor authentication. 6-digit passcodes were much more secure because there were now 1 million possible passcode combinations compared to just 10,000 for 4-digit passcodes.

The original iOS 9 release in September 2015 fixed a security issue in previous iOS versions, in which a "flaw allowed anyone within range of an AirDrop user to install malware on a target device and tweak iOS settings so the exploit would still work if the victim rejected an incoming AirDrop file".

=== Settings ===
The Settings app in iOS 9 includes a new search bar that makes it easier to find settings and options. The user also has options to have notifications be grouped by which app they came from, and the ability to turn on or off Shake to Undo.

=== Other changes ===
On iPad, a two-finger drag on the keyboard moves the cursor freely like a traditional trackpad, making positioning the cursor and selecting text easier. The keyboard-to-trackpad feature is also extended to iPhone 6S and 6S Plus, in which users can 3D Touch (force press) the keyboard to enable the trackpad. Also on the iPad, a shortcut bar has been added for cut, copy, paste, undo, and redo functions, and folders display 16 apps per page in a 4-by-4 arrangement, compared to 9 on the iPhone, allowing for an increased total of 240 apps in a single folder.

iOS 9 introduced Wi-Fi Assist, a feature (enabled by default) that automatically switches the phone to cellular data when the Wi-Fi connection is spotty.

Whenever the user is presented with flight information, the user can click on a link to view a preview for that flight.

== App features ==
=== iBooks ===
With iOS 9.3 and later, PDFs saved to the iBooks application via Safari or iTunes can be synced with iCloud.

=== iCloud ===
iOS 9 has a setting that enables an iCloud Drive app on the home screen. iCloud Drive lets the user save and browse files and folders in iCloud.

=== Health ===
The Health app, introduced in iOS 8, has received landscape mode on iPhone. It also added support for reproductive health, UV exposure, water intake and sedentary state data types.

In iOS 9.3, it also tracks sleep, exercise, and weight from the Apple Watch.

=== Messages ===
Messages now allows the user to search for text and have that text be highlighted (and scrolled).

=== Maps ===
Apple Maps adds support for transit directions in Baltimore, Berlin, Chicago, London, Los Angeles, Mexico City, New York City, Paris, Philadelphia, San Francisco, Toronto, and Washington, D.C., along with "over 300 locations in China."

The Maps app now also has enhanced location details, including a Nearby feature that recommends shops, restaurants and places to drink in close proximity to the user. For places serving food, users can specify exactly what type of food they want.

=== News ===
iOS 9 includes a new Apple News app (replacing the Newsstand app), which aggregates news from different sources in a similar style as Flipboard. The app features a "mobile-formatted layout that loads quickly and has informative animations and full-bleed images". Additionally, News supports RSS feeds from the Safari web browser. At launch, the News app was only available in the United States, but it was expanded to the United Kingdom and Australia with the iOS 9.1 update.

In March 2016, Apple opened the News platform to all news agencies, including independent bloggers.

=== Notes ===
The Notes app has received a number of enhancements in iOS 9, including the ability to draw sketches with a number of different tools, including a ruler for straight lines. Images can also be added, and links to websites and Map locations get a more prominent, visual appearance when added to notes. On the iPad, and on iPhone in landscape mode, Notes has a range of color options for drawing, as well as an eraser. Advanced formatting options including checked, bulleted, dashed and numbered lists.

The app also supports iCloud and allows for easy folder creation.

A secure notes feature, introduced in iOS 9.3, lets an iOS user protect their notes with either a passcode or Touch ID.

=== Photos ===
The Photos app on iOS 9 included the improved scrubber bar in the photo viewer, "Screenshots" and "Selfies" albums, and the ability to hold and select multiple photos easily, without having to delete them individually. It also allows the user to hide sensitive material through a new Hide option. The app also allows the user to pinch to zoom while playing a video.

=== Safari ===
With the release of iOS 9, the Safari web browser allows for third-party content blocking apps. Safari also allows users to customize the appearance of the Reader mode, with options for font and background color.

A few days after the release of iOS 9, ad blocking software had topped the App Store charts, with Marco Arment, developer of a Peace app, saying that "web advertising and behavioral tracking is out of control. They're unacceptably creepy, bloated, annoying, and insecure, and they're getting worse at an alarming pace."

=== Watch ===
The Apple Watch app was renamed to simply Watch.

=== Wallet ===
The Passbook application was renamed Wallet in iOS 9 and includes many new changes, such as support for store loyalty cards, gift cards, Discover credit/debit cards, and Apple Pay in the UK. The Wallet app can also be accessed from the lock screen.

== Developer APIs ==
In iOS 9.3, a "Music API" allows developers to integrate features of the Apple Music streaming service into their apps.

== Reception ==
iOS 9 received mostly positive reviews. Dan Seifert of The Verge praised the improvements in Proactivity and Siri, highlighting how the notification drop-down contains most, if not all, the information the user needs. Although he pointed out that Google's Google Now and Microsoft's Cortana personal assistants offer similar services, sometimes with "better and more varied ways" of achieving results, the improvements to iOS "lay the foundation for even more capabilities in the future." Chris Velazco of Engadget liked the "small, thoughtful" design changes, but was most impressed by the new multitasking features for the iPad, referring to Split Screen as a "lovely little feature." He did, however, criticize the low number of decent-looking articles in Apple News, writing that "you'll notice a discrepancy in how some articles are handled – most are just formatted text on a white background with the outlet's logo up top" and also noted the limited number of locations in Apple Maps that, at launch, supported mass transit directions. Matt Swider of TechRadar wrote that Siri and Proactivity lists were "robust," and enjoyed that notifications were sorted chronologically rather than by app. Samuel Gibbs of The Guardian welcomed the changes to the built-in apps such as drawing and photo insertion in Notes, unknown number identification from emails through Phone, and Siri automatically launching the Music app upon plugging in headphones. He also praised the updates to the keyboard, calling it "much easier to use."

Apple faced a lawsuit over allegedly slowing the iPhone 4s with iOS 9.

On September 21, 2015, Apple announced that iOS 9 had been installed on more than 50% of "active" iOS devices, as measured by the App Store. According to Apple, this was "the fastest adoption rate ever for a new operating system".

== Problems ==
=== Error 53 bricking issue ===
In February 2016, news outlets reported that users who updated to iOS 9 on a particular device that had components repaired by a third-party (notably the Touch ID fingerprint recognition sensor) rendered their phone unusable. The issue, named "Error 53", was, according to iFixIt, limited to iPhone 6 and 6 Plus devices. Apple stated:

We protect fingerprint data using a secure enclave, which is uniquely paired to the Touch ID sensor. When iPhone is serviced by an authorised Apple service provider or Apple retail store for changes that affect the Touch ID sensor, the pairing is re-validated. ... This check ensures the device and the iOS features related to Touch ID remain secure. Without this unique pairing, a malicious Touch ID sensor could be substituted, thereby gaining access to the secure enclave. When iOS detects that the pairing fails, Touch ID, including Apple Pay, is disabled so the device remains secure.

Apple released a new version of iOS 9.2.1 later in February to fix the issue.

=== Date reboot issue ===
In February 2016, a bug was discovered that could render 64-bit devices unusable. The bug, caused by setting the date to January 1, 1970, would cause the device to get stuck in a reboot process until the battery died or the time setting shifted past January 1. A similar bug also applies to 32-bit devices, where the battery would report 0% of charge, and the Wi-Fi would be disabled. iOS 9.3, released on March 21, 2016, fixed the issue.

=== 9.7-inch iPad Pro bricking issue ===
In May 2016, Apple released iOS 9.3.2. The update was followed by reports that it bricked some 9.7-inch iPad Pros, with a "Connect to iTunes" message, and an "Error 56" message in iTunes that it couldn't restore the tablet.

Apple temporarily stopped offering the 9.3.2 update for the 9.7-inch iPad Pro, until a re-release of the version in June 2016 fixed the issue.

=== iBooks crash ===
The release of iOS 9.3.3 in July 2016 was followed by reports that the iBooks store crashed. However, Apple explained in August that the timing was a coincidence, and the iBooks app crash was a result of a server issue, not the software update.

=== Spyware attack ===
The release of iOS 9.3.5 in August 2016 fixed three critical security vulnerabilities. The vulnerabilities could be exploited to silently enable a jailbreak and allow the malicious installation of a spyware called "Pegasus". Pegasus could intercept and read text messages, emails, track calls, trace phone location, activate the microphone, and gather information from apps, including (but not limited to) iMessage, Gmail, Viber, Facebook, WhatsApp, Telegram, and Skype.

The discovery of the vulnerabilities dated 10 days before the 9.3.5 update was released. Arab human rights defender Ahmed Mansoor received a suspicious text message with a link and sent it to Citizen Lab. An investigation ensued with collaboration from Lookout that revealed that if Mansoor clicked the link, it would have jailbroken his phone and implanted it with the spyware. Citizen Lab linked the attack to an Israeli surveillance company known as NSO Group that sells Pegasus to governments for "lawful interception."

Regarding how widespread the issue was, Lookout explained in a blog post: "We believe that this spyware has been in the wild for a significant amount of time based on some of the indicators within the code" and pointed out that the code shows signs of a "kernel mapping table that has values all the way back to iOS 7."

News of the spyware received significant media attention, particularly for being called the "most sophisticated" smartphone attack ever, and for being the first time in iPhone history that a remote jailbreak exploit has been detected.

=== "Broadpwn" Wi-Fi vulnerability ===
In July 2017, information on a critical Wi-Fi security vulnerability affecting 1 billion iOS and Android devices was published. The issue, named "Broadpwn", allows an attacker to remotely take control of nearby vulnerable devices and turn affected devices into "rogue access points", further spreading the infection to other nearby devices. Apple released a security patch for the issue as part of its iOS 10.3.3 update, though older devices running iOS 9, including the iPad 2, 3rd generation iPad, iPhone 4s, the first-generation iPad Mini, and the 5th generation iPod Touch were left without an available update, causing concerns over the safety of the iPad 2, the 3rd generation iPad, and the first-generation iPad Mini in schools.

=== iPhone 4s lawsuit ===
On December 22, 2015, Apple faced a class-action lawsuit for crippling the iPhone 4s with the iOS 9 update, with some people even going so far as to say that iOS 9 rendered their devices unusable. The 4s only had 512MB of RAM, so it could not handle the iOS 9 update. A settlement was reached in 2022, such that users who downloaded iOS 9 onto an iPhone 4s, while living in New York or New Jersey, could receive $15 each, from a fund of $20,000,000 paid by Apple.

=== Activation Error bricking issue ===
Around early 2018, some users who still had devices running iOS 9 with the A9 chip reported being prompted by an "Activation Error" screen that occurred at any random time. Attempting to get out of this error screen would only send the user back to the said screen, unless they restored their device to the latest iOS version in iTunes (which also meant data loss was possible if the device had content in it, as restoring the device wipes everything from it). Around March 2026, the same issue has also began occurring in devices with the A8 chip running iOS 9. This bug still persists as of the present day for certain users currently running iOS 9 on their A8 or A9 devices, and its cause is currently unknown. As of September 2026, Apple has made no public comment regarding the issue.

== Supported devices ==
All devices that support iOS 8 support iOS 9.

=== iPhone ===
- iPhone 4s
- iPhone 5
- iPhone 5c
- iPhone 5s
- iPhone 6 & 6 Plus
- iPhone 6s & 6s Plus
- iPhone SE (1st generation)

=== iPod Touch ===
- iPod Touch (5th generation)
- iPod Touch (6th generation)

=== iPad ===
- iPad 2
- iPad (3rd generation)
- iPad (4th generation)
- iPad Air
- iPad Air 2
- iPad Mini (1st generation)
- iPad Mini 2
- iPad Mini 3
- iPad Mini 4
- iPad Pro (12.9-inch 1st generation)
- iPad Pro (9.7-inch)

== Version history ==
Version	Build	Codename	Release date	Notes
9.0	13A340 (Note: iPad mini 4 only); 13A342 (Note: iPhone 6S only); 13A343 (Note: iPhone 6S Plus only); 13A344	Monarch	September 16, 2015	Initial release on iPhone 6s, iPhone 6s Plus, and iPad mini 4: Allows Siri to search personal photos and videos based on dates, locations, album names, etc.; Ask Siri can now remind users about things they have viewed in apps; Siri can now be asked for directions via public transit; Phone calls, FaceTime calls, and Messages conversations can now be initiated from contacts searched in Spotlight Search; iPad Only; Adds Slide Over, allowing users to switch between apps without exiting the current app, for Apple apps and supported third-party apps; Split View allows using two apps at once with Apple apps and supported third-party apps, with resizeable windows; Picture-in-picture video support for Safari video, FaceTime, Videos, Podcasts, and supported third-party apps; Adds support in Maps for public transit, station details, schedules, and directions; Adds indicator for Apple Pay support on place cards; Allows adding photos to Notes from Photo Library or Camera; Can now draw notes with your finger; Redesigns the News app; Adds support for Discover cards with Apple Pay; Apple Pay can be prepared by double-tapping Home and keeping one's finger on Home; Increases battery life; Software updates now take up less space, can be installed later after downloading; Apple apps and the UI now use Metal to render, for better performance; Using a six-digit passcode is now default instead of a four-digit passcode; San Francisco is now the default system font; Wi-Fi assist automatically uses cellular data if Wi-Fi connectivity is poor; Content can be transferred from an Android device to an iOS device with the Move to iOS app
9.0.1	13A404	Monarch	September 23, 2015	Fixes an issue where some users could not complete setup assistant after updating; Fixes an issue where sometimes alarms and timers could fail to play; Fixes an issue in Safari and Photos apps where pausing video could cause the paused frame to appear distorted; Fixes an issue where some users with a custom APN setup via a profile would lose cellular data
9.0.1	13A405 (Note: iPhone 6S and iPhone 6S Plus only)	Monarch	September 24, 2015	Fixes an issue where some users could not complete setup assistant after updating; Fixes an issue where sometimes alarms and timers could fail to play; Fixes an issue in Safari and Photos apps where pausing video could cause the paused frame to appear distorted; Fixes an issue where some users with a custom APN setup via a profile would lose cellular data
9.0.2	13A452	Monarch	September 30, 2015	Fixes an issue with the setting to turn on or off app cellular data usage; Fixes an issue that prevented iMessage activation for some users; Fixes an issue where an iCloud backup could be interrupted after starting a manual backup; Fixes an issue where the screen could incorrectly rotate when receiving notifications; Fixes an issue where a lock screen issue allowed access to photos and contacts on a locked device; Improved the stability of Podcasts app
9.1	13B143	Boulder	October 21, 2015	Initial release on iPad Pro 12.9" (1st generation): Live Photos now intelligently senses when the iPhone is raised or lowered, so that Live Photos will automatically not record these movements; Over 150 new emoji characters with full support for Unicode 7.0 and 8.0 emojis; Improved overall stability, including CarPlay, Music, Photos, Safari and Search; Improved performance while in Multitasking UI; Fixes an issue that could cause Calendar to become unresponsive in Month view; Fixes an issue that prevented Game Center from launching some users; Fixes an issue that zoomed the content of some apps; Fixes an issue that could cause an incorrect unread mail count for POP mail accounts; Fixes an issue that prevented users from removing recent contacts from new mail or messages; Fixes an issue that caused some messages to not appear in Mail search results; Fixes an issue that left a gray bar in the body of an audio message; Fixes an issue that caused activation errors on some carriers; Fixes an issue that prevented some apps from updating from the App Store
9.1	13B144 (Note: iPad Pro 12.9-inch (1st generation) only)	Boulder	November 17, 2015	
9.2	13C75	Castlerock	December 8, 2015	Apple Music improvements; Ability to create a new playlist when adding a song to a playlist; Most recently changed playlist is now listed at the top when adding songs to playlist; Ability to download albums or playlists from your iCloud Music Library by tapping the iCloud download button; New download indicator next to each song in My Music and Playlists; See works, composers, and performers while browsing Classical music in the Apple Music catalog; iBooks now supports listening to an audiobook while browsing the library, reading other books, or exploring the iBooks Store; iPhone support for USB Camera Adapter to import photos and videos; Siri support for Arabic (Saudi Arabia, United Arab Emirates); Bug fixes
9.2.1	13D15	Dillon	January 19, 2016	Fixes many bugs that allowed local users to execute arbitrary code with kernel privileges; Fixes multiple bugs where visiting a malicious website led to arbitrary code execution; Fixes a bug that allowed captive web portals to read and write user's cookies
9.2.1	13D20 (Note: iPhone 6, iPhone 6 Plus, iPhone 6S, iPhone 6S Plus, iPad Air 2, iPad mini 3, iPad mini 4 and iPad Pro 12.9-inch (1st generation) only)	Dillon	February 18, 2016	Fixes many bugs that allowed local users to execute arbitrary code with kernel privileges; Fixes multiple bugs where visiting a malicious website led to arbitrary code execution; Fixes a bug that allowed captive web portals to read and write user's cookies
9.3	13E233; 13E234 (Note: iPhone 6S, iPhone 6S Plus and iPad Pro 9.7-inch only)	Eagle	March 21, 2016	Initial release on iPhone SE (1st generation): Adds support for a new feature named Night Shift which, manually or automatically (based on user preference), makes the display color warmer so it is easier to view at night. Users can adjust the color temperature in the Settings app; Night Shift works only on 64-bit devices; Adds support for protecting notes inside the Notes app with a passcode or Touch ID; Support for pairing multiple Apple Watches to your iPhone; Support for Spanish (Latin America) display language; Siri support for Finnish, Hebrew and Malay; Fixes an issue where manually changing the date to May 1970 or earlier could prevent 64-bit devices from turning on after a restart
9.3	13E236 (Note: iPad 2 (GSM) only)	Eagle	March 25, 2016	Builds 13E236 and 13E237 were issued to devices that were affected by the Activation Lock bug. These re-issued builds helped correct the issue after the prior builds were withdrawn
9.3	13E237 (Note: iPhone 4s, iPhone 5, iPhone 5c, iPhone 5s, iPad 2 (Wi-Fi), iPad 2 (CDMA), iPad (3rd generation), iPad (4th generation), iPad mini (1st generation), iPad mini 2, iPad Air (1st generation) and iPod touch (5th generation) only)	Eagle	March 28, 2016	Builds 13E236 and 13E237 were issued to devices that were affected by the Activation Lock bug. These re-issued builds helped correct the issue after the prior builds were withdrawn
9.3.1	13E238	Eagle	March 31, 2016	Fixes an issue that caused apps to be unresponsive after tapping on links in Safari or other apps; Fixes an issue where connecting to a fake Apple time server which sets system time to January 1, 1970, can cause 64-bit devices to overheat and become unresponsive after a restart
9.3.2	13F69	Frisco	May 16, 2016	Fixes an issue where some Bluetooth accessories could experience audio quality issues when paired to iPhone SE; Fixes an issue where looking up dictionary definitions could fail; Fixes an issue that prevented typing email addresses when using the Japanese Kana keyboard in Mail and Messages; Fixes an issue for VoiceOver users, using the Alex voice, where the device switches to a different voice to announce punctuation or spaces
9.3.2	13F72 (Note: iPad Pro 9.7-inch only)	Frisco	June 2, 2016	A previous build of iOS 9.3.2 bricked some iPad Pros 9.7-inch. Build 13F72 fixes this issue
9.3.3	13G34	Genoa	July 18, 2016	Fixes multiple bugs that allow for arbitrary code execution with kernel privileges; Fixes a bug that allowed a local attacker to access contact information; Fixes a bug where visiting a malicious website can allow spoofing UI elements
9.3.4	13G35	Genoa	August 4, 2016	Fixes a memory corruption vulnerability in IOMobileFrameBuffer found by Team Pangu that allows arbitrary code execution with kernel privileges
9.3.5	13G36	Genoa	August 25, 2016	Fixes bugs with the kernel that allow unrestricted memory access and arbitrary code execution
Exclusive to iPhone 4s, iPad Mini (1st generation) (Wi-Fi + Cellular), iPad 2 (CDMA) and iPad (3rd generation) (Wi-Fi + Cellular)
9.3.6	13G37	Genoa	July 22, 2019	Fixes an issue that would prevent cellular devices from maintaining an accurate GPS position after November 3, 2019

== See also ==
- OS X El Capitan
- tvOS 9
- watchOS 1

Preceded by iOS 8	iOS 9; 2015	Succeeded by iOS 10
