= Apple A9X =

System-on-a-chip designed by Apple Inc.

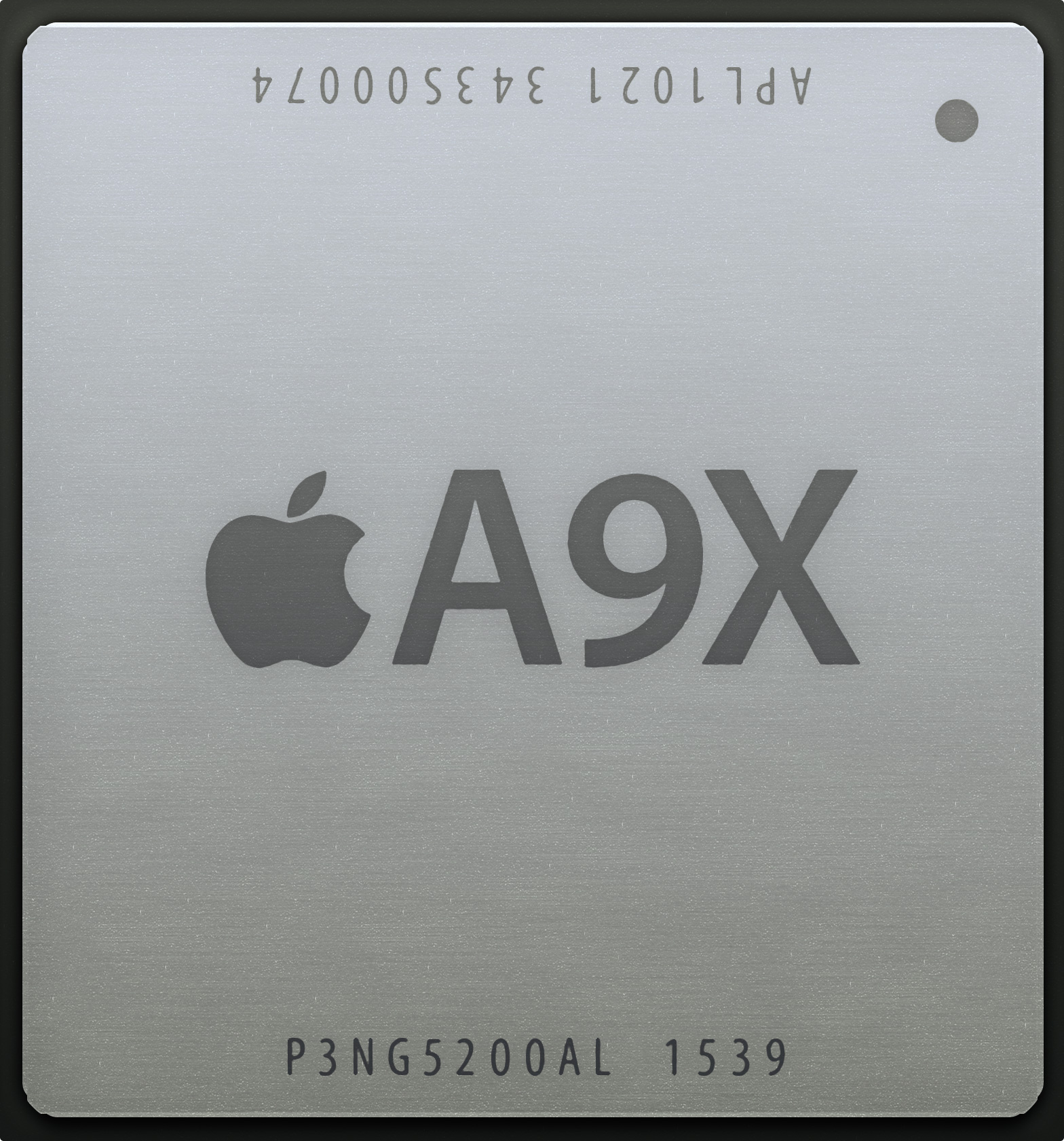
- Apple A9X chip

General information
- Launched: September 9, 2015
- Discontinued: June 5, 2017
- Designed by: Apple Inc.
- Common manufacturer: TSMC
- Product code: APL1021
- Max. CPU clock rate: to 2.26 GHz

Physical specifications
- Cores: 2
- GPU: Custom PowerVR Series7XT (12 cores)

Cache
- L1 cache: Per core: 64 KB instruction + 64 KB data
- L2 cache: 3 MB shared

Architecture and classification
- Application: Mobile
- Technology node: 16FF+ nm (TSMC)
- Microarchitecture: Twister
- Instruction set: ARMv8-A: A64, A32, T32

Products, models, variants
- Variant: Apple A9

History
- Predecessor: Apple A8X
- Successor: Apple A10X

The Apple A9X is a 64-bit ARM architecture-based system on a chip (SoC) designed by Apple Inc., part of the Apple silicon series. It first appeared in the iPad Pro, which was announced on September 9, 2015 and was released on November 11, 2015. The A9X has the M9 motion coprocessor embedded in it, something not seen in previous chip generations. It is a variant of the A9 and Apple claims that it has 80% more CPU performance and twice the GPU performance of its predecessor, the A8X.

The final software update for the iPad Pro 9.7-inch (2016) and iPad Pro 12.9-inch (1st generation, 2015) variants of this chip was iPadOS 16.7.16

== Design ==
The A9X features an Apple-designed 64-bit ARMv8-A dual-core CPU called "Twister". It offers double the memory bandwidth and double the storage performance of the Apple A8X.

Unlike the A9, the A9X does not contain an L3 cache due to its significant DRAM bandwidth. The A9X is paired with 4 GB of LPDDR4 memory in the 12.9" iPad Pro and 2 GB of LPDDR4 memory in the 9.7" iPad Pro with a total bandwidth of 51.2 GB/s. This high bandwidth is necessary to feed the SoC's custom 12-core PowerVR Series7XT GPU. The RAM is not included in the A9X package unlike its sibling, the A9.

The A9X uses the same NAND interface as the A9, which uses an Apple-designed NVMe-based controller that communicates over a PCIe connection. The iPad Pro's NAND design is more akin to a PC-class SSD than embedded flash memory common on mobile devices. This gives the iPad Pro a significant storage performance advantage over competitors which often use mSATA or eMMC to connect to their storage systems.

The A9X has video codec encoding support for H.264. It has decoding support for HEVC, H.264, MPEG‑4, and Motion JPEG.

== Products that include the Apple A9X ==
- iPad Pro 9.7-inch (2016)
- iPad Pro 12.9-inch (2015)
- Apple TV 4K (unreleased)

== See also ==
- Apple silicon, the range of ARM-based processors designed by Apple.
- Apple motion coprocessors
- Comparison of ARMv8-A cores
