= IOS 8 =

2014 mobile operating system

iOS 8
- Version of the iOS operating system
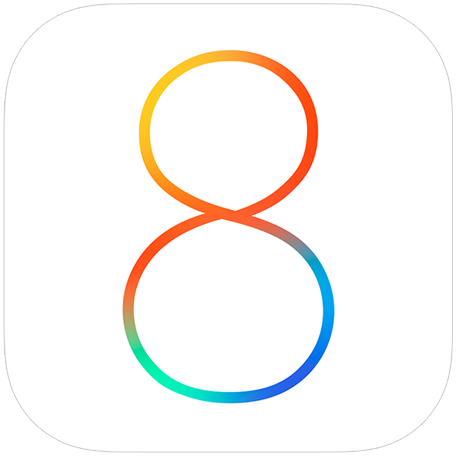

- iOS 8.2 home screen on an iPhone 6 Plus
- Developer: Apple Inc.
- Working state: No longer supported
- Source model: Closed, with open source components
- Initial release: September 17, 2014; 12 years ago
- Latest release: 8.4.1 (12H321) / August 13, 2015; 11 years ago
- Update method: Software Update
- Package manager: App Store
- Supported platforms: iPhone, iPod Touch, iPad
- Kernel type: Hybrid (XNU)
- License: Proprietary EULA except for free software components
- Preceded by: iOS 7
- Succeeded by: iOS 9
- Official website: iOS 8 - Apple at the Wayback Machine (archived September 5, 2015)
- Tagline: The biggest iOS release ever.

Support status
- Obsolete, unsupported

iOS 8 is the eighth major release of the iOS mobile operating system developed by Apple Inc., being the successor to iOS 7. It was announced at the company's Worldwide Developers Conference on June 2, 2014, and was released on September 17, 2014. It was succeeded by iOS 9 on September 16, 2015.

iOS 8 incorporated significant changes to the operating system. It introduced a programming interface for communication between apps, and "Continuity", a cross-platform (Mac, iPhone, and iPad) system that enables communication between devices in different product categories, such as the ability to answer calls and reply to SMS on the Mac and iPad. Continuity includes a "Handoff" feature that lets users start a task on one device and continue on another. Other changes included a new Spotlight Suggestions search results feature that provides more detailed results, Family Sharing, where a family can link together their accounts to share content, with one parent as the administrator with permission controls, an updated keyboard with QuickType, providing contextual predictive word suggestions and Extensibility, which allows for easier sharing of content between apps. Third-party developers got additional features to integrate their apps deeper into the operating system, including support for widgets in the Notification Center, and the ability to make keyboards that users can replace the default iOS keyboard with.

App updates in the release included the new Health app, which can aggregate data from different fitness apps, as well as enabling a Medical ID accessible on the lock screen for emergencies, support for iCloud Photo Library in the Photos app, which enables photos to be synchronized and stored in the cloud, and iCloud Drive, which lets users store files in the cloud and browse them across devices. In iOS 8.4, Apple updated its Music app with a streaming service called Apple Music, and a 24-hour radio station called Apple Music 1.

iOS 8 was well received. Critics praised Continuity and Extensibility as major features enabling easier control and interaction between different apps and devices. They also liked the QuickType keyboard word suggestions, and highlighted Spotlight Suggestions for making the iPhone "almost a portable search portal for everything.” However, reviewers noted that the full potential for iOS 8 would only be realized once third-party developers integrated their apps to support new features, particularly widgets in the Notification Center.

Roughly a week after release, iOS 8 had reached 46% of iOS usage share. In October 2014, it was reported that the adoption rate had "stalled,” only increasing by "a single percentage point" from the previous month. This situation was blamed on the requirement of a high amount of free storage space to install the upgrade, especially difficult for iPhones sold with 8 or 16 gigabytes of maximum storage space. The following December, iOS 8 had reached 63% usage share, a notable 16% increase from the October measurement.

== History ==
=== Introduction and initial release ===
iOS 8 was introduced at the company's Worldwide Developers Conference on June 2, 2014, with the first beta made available to conference attendees after the keynote presentation.

iOS 8 was officially released on September 17, 2014.

iOS 8.4.1 home screen on an iPad Mini

== System features ==
=== Continuity ===
iOS 8 introduced Continuity, a cross-platform (Mac, iPhone, and iPad) system that enables communication between devices in different product categories. Continuity enables phone call functionality for the iPad and Mac, in which calls are routed through the iPhone over to a secondary device. The secondary device then serves as a speaker phone. This also brings SMS support to the iPad and Mac, an extension of the iMessage feature in previous versions.

Continuity adds a feature called "Handoff," that lets users start a task on one device and continue on another, such as composing an e-mail on the iPhone and then continuing it on the iPad before sending it on the Mac. In order to support Handoff and Continuity, Macs needed to have the OS X Yosemite operating system, which was released in October 2014, as well as support for Bluetooth low energy.

=== Spotlight ===
iOS 8 introduced Spotlight Suggestions, a new search feature that integrates with many websites and services to show more detailed search results, including snippets of Wikipedia articles, local news, quick access to apps installed on the device, iTunes content, movie showtimes, nearby places, and info from various websites. Spotlight Suggestions are available on the iOS home screen as well as in the Safari web browser search bar.

=== Notifications ===
The drop-down Notification Center has now been redesigned to allow widget functionality. Third-party developers can add widget support to their apps that let users see information in the Notification Center without having to open each respective app. Users can add, rearrange, or remove any widgets, at any time. Examples of widgets include a Weather app showing current weather, and a Calendar app showing upcoming events.

Notifications are now actionable, allowing users to reply to a message while it appears as a quick drop-down, or act on a notification through the Notification Center.

=== Keyboard ===
iOS 8 includes a new predictive typing feature called QuickType, which displays word predictions above the keyboard as the user types.

Apple now allows third-party developers to make keyboard apps that users can replace the default iOS keyboard with. For added privacy, Apple added a settings toggle called "Allow Full Access", that optionally enables the keyboard to act outside its app sandbox, such as synchronizing keyboard data to the cloud, third-party keyboards are not allowed to use Siri for voice dictation, and some secure text fields do not allow input.

=== Family Sharing ===
iOS 8 introduced Family Sharing, which allows up to 6 people to register unique iTunes accounts that are then linked together, with one parent becoming the administrator, controlling the overall experience. Purchases made on one account can be shared with the other family members, but purchases made by kids under 13 years of age require parental approval. Purchases made by adults will not be visible for the kids at all.

Family Sharing also extends into apps, a Shared album is automatically generated in the Photos app of each family member, allowing everyone to add photos, videos, and comments to a shared place. An Ask to Buy feature allows anyone to request the purchase of items in the App Store, iTunes Store, and iBooks Store, as well as in-app purchases and iCloud storage, with the administrator having the option to either approve or deny the purchase.

=== Multitasking ===
The multitasking screen shows a list of recently called and favorited contacts. The feature can be turned off in Settings.

=== Other ===
iOS 8 includes an additional data roaming option in Settings for European users, allowing greater control over data usage abroad.

The Siri personal voice assistant now has integrated Shazam support. Asking Siri "What song is this?" will identify what song is playing.

Wi-Fi calling has been added to allow mobile phone calls over Wi-Fi. Mobile operator carriers can then enable the Voice-over-Wi-Fi functionality in their services.

== App features ==
=== Photos and Camera ===
==== Camera app ====
The Camera app gets two new features; time-lapse and self-timer. Time-lapse records frames at shorter intervals than normal film frequencies and builds them into movies, showing events in a faster speed. Self-timer gives the user the option of a three-second or ten-second countdown before automatically taking a photo. iPads can now take pictures in panoramic mode.

==== iCloud Photo Library ====
iOS 8 added iCloud Photo Library support to the Photos app, enabling photo synchronization between different Apple devices. Photos and videos were backed up in full resolution and in their original formats. This feature almost meant that lower-quality versions of photos could be cached on the device rather than the full-size images, potentially saving significant storage space on models with limited storage availability.

==== Search ====
The Photos app received better search, with different search categorization options, including Nearby, One Year Ago, Favorites, and Home, based on geolocation and date of photo capture.

==== Editing ====
Additionally, the Photos app gained more precise editing controls, including improved rotation; one-touch auto-enhancement tools; and deeper color adjustments, such as brightness, contrast, exposure, and shadows. There is also an option to hide a photo without deleting it.

==== Extensions ====
Apple added an Extensibility feature in iOS 8, that allows filters and effects from third-party apps to be accessed directly from within a menu in the standard Photos app, rather than having to import and export photos through each respective app to apply effects.

==== Camera Roll ====
In the initial release of iOS 8, Apple removed the "Camera Roll" feature from the Photos app. Camera Roll was an overview of all photos on the device, but was replaced by a "Recently Added" photo view displaying photos by how recently the user captured them.

Despite being replaced by a "Recently Added" album, the removal of Camera Roll sparked user complaints, which Apple returned the feature in the iOS 8.1 update.

=== Messages ===
In iOS 8, Messages gets new features for group conversations, including a Do Not Disturb mode that disables conversation notifications, as well as the ability to remove participants from the chat. A new Tap to Talk chat button lets users send quick voice comments to a recipient, and a Record button allows users to record short videos.

For interaction between two Apple users, the Messages app allows users to send short picture, video or audio clips with a 2-minute expiration time.

In the Settings app, the user has the option to have messages be automatically deleted after a certain time period.

=== Safari ===
In the Safari web browser, developers can now add support for Safari Password Sharing, which allows them to share credentials between sites they own and apps they own, potentially cutting down on the number of times users need to type in credentials for their apps and services. The browser also adds support for the WebGL graphics API.

=== iCloud Drive ===
In a similar style as a file manager, the iCloud Drive is a file hosting service that, once enabled in Settings, lets users save any kind of file in the app, and the media is synchronized to other iOS devices, as well as the Mac.

=== App Store ===
In iOS 8, Apple updated App Store with an "Explore" tab providing improved app discovery, trending searches in the "Search" tab, and the ability for developers to bundle multiple apps into a single discounted package. New "preview" videos allow developers to visually show an app's function.

=== Health ===
HealthKit is a service that allows developers to make apps that integrate with the new Health app. The Health app primarily aggregates data from fitness apps installed on the user's device, except for steps and flights climbed, which are tracked through the motion processor on the user's iPhone. Users can enter their medical history in Medical ID, which is accessible on the lock screen, in case of an emergency.

=== HomeKit ===
HomeKit serves as a software framework that lets users set up their iPhone to configure, communicate with, and control smart-home appliances. By designing rooms, items and actions in the HomeKit service, users can enable automatic actions in the house through a simple voice dictation to Siri or through apps.

Manufacturers of HomeKit-enabled devices are required to purchase a license, and all HomeKit products are required to have an encryption co-processor. Equipment manufactured without HomeKit-support can be enabled for use through a "gateway" product, such as a hub that connects between those devices and the HomeKit service.

=== Passbook ===
The Passbook app on iOS 8 was updated to support Apple Pay, a digital payment service, available on iPhone 6 and 6 Plus with the release of iOS 8.1.

=== Music ===
A new music streaming service, Apple Music, was introduced in the iOS 8.4 update. It allows subscribers to listen to an unlimited number of songs on-demand through subscriptions. With the release of the music service, the standard Music app on iOS was revamped both visually and functionally to include Apple Music, as well as the 24-hour live radio station Beats 1.

=== Notes ===
Notes received rich text editing support, with the ability to bold, italicize or underline text; and image support, allowing users to post photos in the app.

=== Weather ===
The Weather app now uses weather data from The Weather Channel instead of Yahoo!. The app also received slight changes in the user interface. In March 2019, Yahoo! ended support for the Weather app on iOS 7 and earlier.

=== Tips ===
iOS 8 added a new "Tips" app, that shows tips and brief information about the features in iOS on a weekly basis.

=== Touch ID ===
iOS 8 allows Touch ID to be used in third-party apps.

== Reception ==
iOS 8 received positive reviews. Brad Molen of Engadget highlighted Continuity as a major advancement for users with multiple Apple devices. He also praised the Extensibility feature, allowing apps to share data, and liked the support for third-party keyboards. However, Molen noted that some of the new introductions - Family Sharing, Continuity, and iCloud Drive - require further diving into the Apple ecosystem to work. He particularly enjoyed actionable notifications and third-party widget support in Notification Center. Charles Arthur of The Guardian also liked Extensibility, as well as the new QuickType word suggestions functionality in the iOS keyboard. He criticized the lack of an option for choosing default apps, and he also criticized the Settings menu for being confusing and unintuitive.

Darrell Etherington of TechCrunch praised the improvements to iMessage, writing: "Best for me has been the ability to mute and leave group conversations, which is something I've been sorely missing since the introduction of group iMessage conversations." He liked the new search and editing features in Photos, and the QuickType feature in the keyboard, but particularly highlighted Spotlight Suggestions as "one of the better features of iOS 8, even if it's a small service addition," noting that "it makes your iPhone almost a portable search portal for everything." Martin Bryant of The Next Web wrote that "The real advances here are yet to come," adding that "Apple has included demonstrations of what can be done, but the true power of what's under the hood will be realized over the coming days, weeks and months" as third-party developers gradually incorporate new features into their apps.

On September 23, 2014, "roughly a week" after the release of iOS 8, user adoption of iOS 8 had reached 46%. In October 2014, Andrew Cunningham of Ars Technica reported that iOS 8 user adoption rate had "stalled," only climbing "a single percentage point" since the previous September measurement of 46%. Cunningham blamed the "over-the-air" update requiring 5 gigabytes to install, an "unusually large amount" that may have posed challenges to those using 8 gigabyte and 16 gigabyte devices. As an alternative, Apple offered the update via its iTunes software, but Cunningham noted that "An iTunes hookup is going to be even more out of the way these days than it was a few years ago, not least because Apple has spent the last three years coaching people to use their iDevices independently of their computers." In December, a new report from Ars Technica stated that iOS 8 usage had increased to 63%, up "a solid 16 percent."

== Problems ==
=== App crash rate ===
A study by Apteligent (formerly Crittercism) found that the rate at which apps crashed in their tests was 3.56% on iOS 8, higher than the 2% found on iOS 7.1.

=== 8.0.1 update issues ===
In September 2014, the iOS 8.0.1 update caused significant issues with Touch ID on iPhone 6 and cellular network connectivity on some models. Apple stated that affected users should reinstall the initial iOS 8 release until version 8.0.2 was ready.

iOS 8.0.2 was released one day after 8.0.1, with a fix for issues caused by the 8.0.1 update.

=== Miscellaneous bugs ===
Forbes published several articles focusing on problems in iOS 8 regarding Wi-Fi and battery, Bluetooth, and calendar.

=== "Effective power" text message crash ===
In May 2015, news outlets reported on a bug where receiving a text message with a specific combination of symbols and Arabic characters, caused the Messages application to crash and the iPhone to reboot.

The bug, named "effective power," could potentially continuously reboot a device if the message was visible on the lock screen.

The flaw was exploited for the purpose of trolling, by intentionally causing others' phones to crash.

The bug was fixed in iOS 8.4, an update released in June 2015.

Once a device is upgraded to iOS 8, it is impossible to downgrade it back to iOS 7.

== Hoaxes ==
=== "Apple Wave" microwave charging ===
In September 2014, a hoax Apple advertisement for an alleged feature of iOS 8 called "Wave" circulated on Twitter, which promised users that they would be able to recharge their iPhone by heating it in a microwave oven. This feature did not exist, and the media cited numerous people reporting on Twitter that they had destroyed their iPhones by following the procedure described in the advertisement. The hoax had originated from 4chan, an anonymous imageboard and forum website.

== Supported devices ==
iOS 8 supports devices with an Apple A5 or higher SoC. Apple dropped support for the iPhone 4.

=== iPhone ===
- iPhone 4s
- iPhone 5
- iPhone 5c
- iPhone 5s
- iPhone 6 & 6 Plus

=== iPod Touch ===
- iPod Touch (5th generation)
- iPod Touch (6th generation)

=== iPad ===
- iPad 2
- iPad (3rd generation)
- iPad (4th generation)
- iPad Air (1st generation)
- iPad Air 2
- iPad Mini (1st generation)
- iPad Mini 2
- iPad Mini 3

== Version history ==
Version	Build	Codename	Release date	Notes
8.0	12A365; 12A366 (Note: iPhone 6 Plus only)	Okemo	September 17, 2014	Initial release on iPhone 6 and iPhone 6 Plus: Adds Tap to Talk to send a voice recording, video, or photo with a swipe; Group Messages can now be named; Members can be added or removed during a Group Message rather than just at the beginning; Photos' light and color levels can easily be edited with a swipe; Controls are more fine-tuned; Photos can be searched for by date, location, or album name; Third-party photo filters and editing tools can be integrated into photos; Time-lapse mode has been added to Camera; Exposure can be adjusted with a nudge; Panoramic photos can be taken with iPad Air and iPad mini 2; Adds Continuity, for iPhone 5 or later, iPad 4, iPad Air 1, iPad mini 2, and iPod Touch 5; Calls and SMS/MMS messages can be made from an iPad or Mac; Instant Hotspots can be made to automatically share users' cellular connections to their other devices; Compatibility with OS X Yosemite has been added to AirDrop; Siri can now purchase content from the iTunes Store; "Hey, Siri" can now be used activate Siri using just a user's voice to recognize your voice when the device is plugged in; Siri can use Shazam to identify the playing music; Safari can now use DuckDuckGo as a search engine; Notes can edit rich text; Fixes a bug where an attacker can obtain Wi-Fi credentials; Fixes a bug where a malicious application may be able to identify the Apple ID associated with the device; Fixes a bug where the device may fail to lock the screen if AssistiveTouch is enabled; Fixes a bug where a local attacker may be able to install unverified applications without permission; Fixes a bug where an iOS device may think it is up to date; Fixes a bug where clicking on a FaceTime link in Mail triggers an audio FaceTime call without prompting; Fixes a bug where iCloud Activation Lock may be bypassed; Encrypts location data sent by the Weather app; Fixes a bug that allowed users to be tracked by their Wi-Fi MAC addresses
8.0.1	12A402	Okemo	September 24, 2014	Enables third-party HealthKit app support; Fixes a bug where third-party keyboards become deselected after a user enters their passcode; Fixes an issue that prevented apps from accessing the Photo Library; Improves reliability of Reachability on iPhone 6 and iPhone 6 Plus; Addresses an issue that caused high data usage when receiving SMS/MMS messages; Better support of Ask To Buy for Family Sharing for In-App Purchases; Fixes a bug where custom ringtones failed to restore from iCloud backups; Fixes a bug that caused photos and videos to fail to upload in Safari; Disables cellular reception on iPhone 6 and iPhone 6 Plus; Disables Touch ID authentication on iPhone 6 and iPhone 6 Plus
8.0.2	12A405	Okemo	September 25, 2014	Reenables cellular reception on iPhone 6 and iPhone 6 Plus; Reenables Touch ID on iPhone 6 and iPhone 6 Plus
8.1	12B410; 12B411 (Note: iPhone 4S, iPhone 5, iPhone 5C, iPhone 5S, iPhone 6, iPhone 6 Plus and iPod Touch (5th generation) only)	OkemoTaos	October 20, 2014	Initial release on iPad Air 2 and iPad mini 3: Introduces Apple Pay for iPhone 6 and 6 Plus in the United States; Adds support for iCloud Photo Library (beta), allowing users to store photos in iCloud; Restores the Camera Roll in Photos; Alerts iPhone users that they are low on space before capturing Time-Lapse video; Fixes a bug that prevented messages from being marked as read; Adds the ability to select 2G, 3G, or LTE networks for cellular data; Allows HealthKit apps to access Health data in the background; Allows use of OS X Caching Server for iOS updates; Fixes a bug where a maliciously crafted Bluetooth device may bypass pairing; Fixes a bug where QuickType may learn users' credentials
8.1.1	12B435; 12B436 (Note: iPhone 6, iPhone 6 Plus, iPad Air 2 and iPad mini 3 only)	SUOkemoTaos	November 17, 2014	Increases performance for iPhone 4s and iPad 2; Fixes a bug where a local user can execute unsigned code; Fixes a bug that allowed a malicious application to execute arbitrary code with kernel privileges; Fixes a bug that allowed a local attacker to bypass the maximum incorrect passcode attempt count
8.1.2	12B440	SUOkemoTaos	December 9, 2014	Fixes an issue where ringtones purchased through the iTunes Store would be unexpectedly removed from an iOS device
8.1.3	12B466	SUOkemoTaosTwo	January 27, 2015	Reduces OTA software update size; Fixes a bug that prevented some users from entering their Apple ID password to enable iMessage and FaceTime; Fixes an issue that caused multitasking gestures to stop working on iPads
8.2	12D508	OkemoZurs	March 9, 2015	Adds support for the Apple Watch on iPhone 5 and later; Introduces the Watch app to pair and sync Watches; Introduces the Activity app to view fitness data and achievements; only appears when a Watch is paired; Allows setting the unit of measurement for distance, body temperature, weight, high, and blood glucose levels; Improves stability of many apps; Fixes an issue where Maps failed to navigate correctly to Favorite locations; Fixes an issue where duplicated iTunes purchases prevented an iCloud backup from completing; Fixes an issue where music and playlists failed to sync from iTunes to Music; Fixes an issue where all Calendar events appear in GMT instead of the user's local time zone; Fixes an issue that prevented users from adding a photo in Medical ID; Fixes units for vitamins and minerals; Fixes a bug where a local attacker may be able to view the home screen of an unactivated device
8.3	12F69; 12F70 (Note: iPhone 4S, iPhone 5, iPhone 5C, iPhone 5S, iPhone 6 and iPhone 6 Plus only)	Stowe	April 8, 2015	Improves launch performance for many applications; Fixes a bug that caused users to be continually prompted for login credentials for Wi-Fi networks; Fixes a random disconnect bug for Wi-Fi; Fixes a bug that prevented a device from rotating its screen orientation from landscape to portrait; Fixes a bug that caused screen rotation to appear upside down on iPhone 6 Plus; Fixes a bug that caused group messages to split; Redesigns the Emoji keyboard and adds over 300 new emojis; iCloud Photo Library is now out of beta with OS X Yosemite 10.10.3; Adds new languages to Siri; English (India); English (New Zealand); Danish; Dutch; Portuguese; Russian; Swedish; Thai; Turkish; Arabic (Saudi Arabia); Arabic (United Arab Emirates); Hebrew (Israel); Improves stability for many system applications; Fixes a bug that caused Slide to Unlock to fail to unlock the device; Fixes a bug that caused time to incorrectly display as 00:00 on Lock Screen; Fixes a bug that allowed a malicious application to guess the device's passcode; Fixes a bug that allowed a local attacker to bypass the maximum incorrect passcode attempt limit; Fixes a bug that prevented a device from erasing itself after 10 incorrect passcode inputs
8.4	12H143	Copper	June 30, 2015	Initial release on iPod touch (6th generation): Introduces Apple Music, a subscription service for Music; The Music app icon is redesigned; Adds the For You tab, where playlist and album recommendations are delivered by music experts; Adds the New tab, where newly published music is available; Adds the My Music tab, which shows all iTunes purchases, playlists, Apple Music songs, and more in one place; Introduces the MiniPlayer; iTunes Store can still be used to buy music; Audiobooks are moved to iBooks from Music; The iBooks app is redesigned; Now Playing is added to iBooks for audiobooks; Made for iBooks books now work on both iPhone and iPad; Audiobooks can be downloaded inside iBooks; Fixes a bug that prevented books from being downloaded from iCloud; Fixes a bug where deleted Apple Watch apps may reinstall themselves; Fixes a bug where visiting a maliciously crafted website may allow Apple ID takeover; Fixes a bug that allowed maliciously crafted SIM cards to execute arbitrary code; Fixes a bug that allowed maliciously crafted websites to spoof UI elements
8.4.1	12H321	Donner	August 13, 2015	Bug fixes for Apple Music; Fixes multiple bugs that prevented enabling iCloud Music Library; Fixes a bug that hid added Apple Music if Apple Music was set to show offline music only; Fixes an issue that may show incorrect artwork; Fixes multiple issues for artists posting to Connect; Fixes an issue where tapping Love doesn't work when listening to Beats 1; Fixes a bug that allowed a maliciously crafted Apple File Conduit, or AFC command to access protected parts of the filesystem; Fixes a bug that allowed a malicious website to spawn an infinite number of alert messages, preventing iOS from being used without a force restart; Fixes a bug that allowed FaceTime calls to be forcefully accepted; Patches security flaws that allowed the TaiG jailbreak to work.

== See also ==
- OS X Yosemite
- Apple TV Software 7

Preceded by iOS 7	iOS 8; 2014	Succeeded by iOS 9
