= Siri Remote =

Remote control by Apple

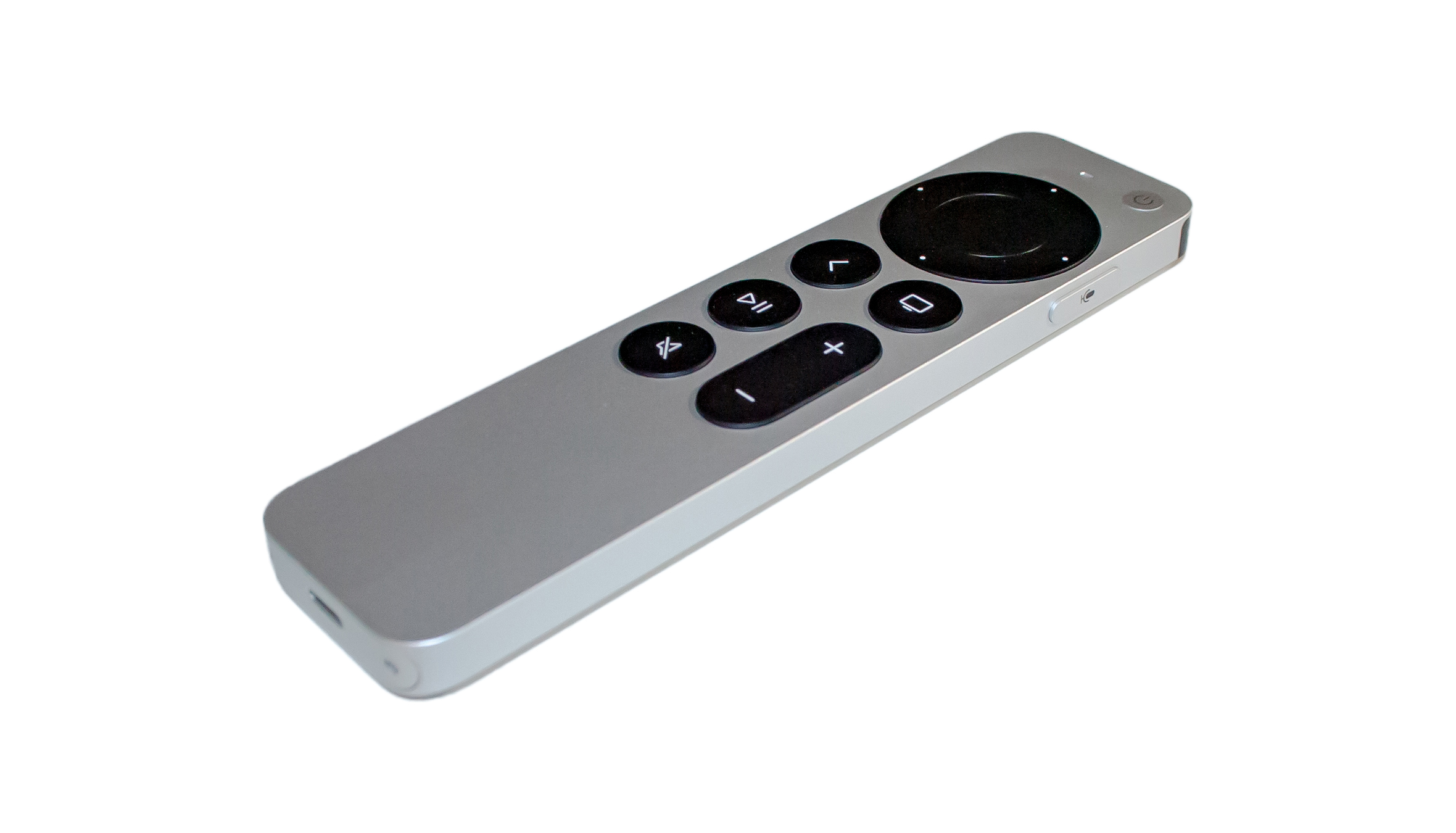
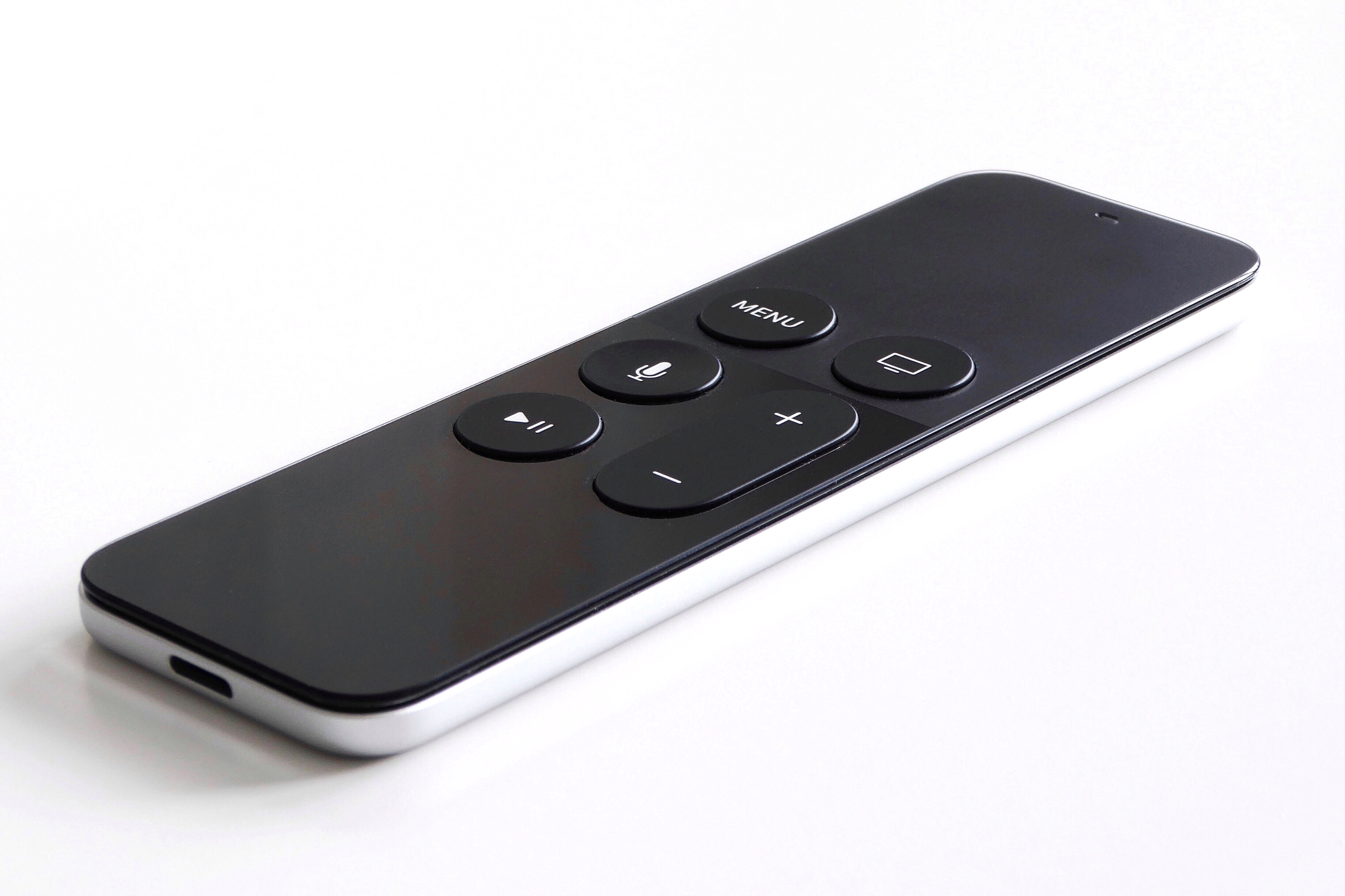
- Siri Remote 2nd gen. (top) and 1st gen. (bottom)
- Also known as: Apple TV Remote
- Developer: Apple Inc.
- Manufacturer: Foxconn and Pegatron (under contract)
- Type: Remote control
- Released: 1st gen.: October 30, 2015; 2nd gen.: May 21, 2021; 3rd gen.: November 4, 2022; 4th gen.: November 13, 2026
- Introductory price: 1st gen.: US$79 (equivalent to $107 in 2025); 2nd/3rd/4th gen.: US$59
- System on a chip: ST Microelectronics STM32L151QD
- CPU: ARM Cortex-M3
- Memory: 48 KB RAM
- Storage: 384 KB Flash with ECC
- Platform: tvOS
- Predecessor: Apple Remote

The Siri Remote (known as the Apple TV Remote in regions where Siri is not supported) is a remote control released by Apple with the Siri-capable fourth generation and later Apple TV. It replaced the Apple Remote.

== Models ==
=== First generation ===
The first generation Siri Remote is visually distinguished by a trackpad covering the upper third of its face. The glass multi-touch surface allows for clicking, swiping in any of four directions for navigation, tilting the trackpad button in any direction to "tilt" buttons in the interface. The Siri Remote is equipped with dual microphones for spoken input for Siri and text entry. In addition to controlling the Apple TV itself, the Siri Remote can learn the IR codes to control the volume of a TV, sound bar, or receiver.

The remote has a InvenSense ITG-3600 chip providing accelerometer and 3-axis gyroscope functions. The trackpad is driven by a Broadcom BCM5976C1KUB6G touch screen controller.

On September 12, 2017, along with the announcement of the Apple TV 4K, Apple announced an updated Siri Remote with a raised white border around the menu button and additional motion data for apps, providing attitude and rotation rate, in addition to the acceleration and gravity data generated by the original version. Additionally, the price was reduced to $59.

=== Second generation ===
On April 20, 2021 Apple announced a redesigned second generation Siri Remote in conjunction with an updated Apple TV 4K. The new remote is thicker with a curved back, changes the trackpad to a circular touch-enabled click pad reminiscent of the iPod click wheel; in the audiovisual player, it allows users to navigate through the video stream like a jog dial. The new remote replaces the menu button with a back button, adds television power and mute buttons, and moves the Siri button to the upper right-side edge. The remote does not include an accelerometer and gyroscope, which were present in the previous Siri Remote, making it incompatible with some games. It is backwards compatible with the Apple TV HD and later and shipped with an updated SKU of the Apple TV HD.

=== Third generation ===
On October 18, 2022, Apple announced an updated third generation Siri Remote to ship with the Apple TV 4K (third generation) that includes a USB-C port for charging, replacing Lightning, and is otherwise identical to the second generation remote. It is backwards compatible with the Apple TV HD and later.

=== Fourth generation ===
Apple announced the fourth generation Siri Remote on October 13, 2026, alongside the Apple TV 4K (fourth generation). It adds Find My support with precision finding which is supported by iPhones with Bluetooth 6 (iPhone 17 or newer, excluding iPhone 17e), and a built-in speaker that can play a sound to help locate the remote. It is backwards compatible with the Apple TV HD and later.

== Specifications ==
| Models | | 1st gen. | 2nd gen. | 3rd gen. | 4th gen. |
|---|---|---|---|---|---|
| Release date | | October 30, 2015 | May 21, 2021 | November 4, 2022 | November 13, 2026 |
| Model number | | A1962 | A2540 | A2854 | A3592 |
| Discontinued | | May 21, 2021 | October 18, 2022 | October 13, 2026 | In production |
| Dimensions (H × W × D) | | 124 × 38 × 6.4 mm (4.88 × 1.50 × 0.25 in) | 140 × 36 × 9.1 mm (5.51 × 1.42 × 0.36 in) | | 136 × 35 × 9.25 mm (5.354 × 1.378 × 0.364 in) |
| Weight | | 47 g (1.7 oz) | 63 g (2.2 oz) | | 69.6 g (2.46 oz) |
| Microphones | | 2 | | | |
| Speaker | | No | | | Yes |
| Connectivity | IR transmitter | Yes | | | |
| Connectivity | Bluetooth | 4.0 | 5.0 | | 6.0 |
| Sensors | Accelerometer | Yes | No | | |
| Sensors | Gyroscope | Yes | No | | |
| Power | Battery | Lithium-ion polymer (3.78V, 1.55 W•h, 410 mA•h) | Lithium-ion (3.81V, 1.52 W•h, 398 mA•h) | | |
| Power | Charge port | Lightning | | USB-C | |
| Environmental requirements | Operating temp | 32° to 95 °F (0° to 35 °C) | | | |
| Environmental requirements | Nonoperating temp | -4° to 113 °F (-20° to 45 °C) | | | |
| Environmental requirements | Relative humidity | 5% to 95% noncondensing | | | |
| Environmental requirements | Operating altitude | Tested up to 10,000 feet (3,000 m) | | | |
| FCCID | | BCGA1513 | BCGA2540 | BCGA2854 | BCGA3592 |

== Usability ==
The first generation Siri Remote's usability has been controversial, with users reporting difficulty navigating using the trackpad. In late 2019, the Swiss telecom provider Salt, which uses the Apple TV 4K as the set-top box for its IPTV offerings, introduced its own replacement IR remote control using traditional buttons. It was sold as an optional accessory for about CHF 20. It has since become available under numerous other brand names.

Since then, another alternative remote control from Universal Electronics has been released for distribution through telecom providers. This model includes a microphone for Siri, connects using Bluetooth, and has been distributed by numerous TV providers, including Salt, Telekom Deutschland, and Spectrum. It is also sold at retail under Universal Electronics' One For All brand.

== See also ==
- Apple Remote
- Apple TV
- Front Row
- iTunes Remote
- Remote control
