= Remote =

Remote may refer to:

== Arts, entertainment, and media ==
- Remote (1993 film), a 1993 movie
- Remote (2004 film), a Tamil-language action drama film
- Remote (album), a 1988 album by Hue & Cry
- Remote (band), ambient chillout band
- Remote (EP), an extended play by Wallows
- Remote (manga), a 2002 manga
- Remote, a character from the fourth season of Battle for Dream Island, an animated web series
- Remote broadcast, commonly known in broadcasting as a person or a live remote

== Computing and technology ==
- Remote (Apple software), software application made by Apple Inc. for the iOS
- Remote (platform), for human resources
- Remote control, commonly known as a remote
- Remote control car, a car that can be controlled from a distance
- Remote desktop or operating system, can be controlled by another system device
- Remote operation

== Places ==
- Remote, Oregon
- Remote Peninsula, Canada
- Remote Western Australia

== Other uses ==
- Remote work, the practice of working from outside of an office
- Remote and isolated community, a community in a remote location
- Remote learning, distance learning
- Remote, to implement a remotion, withdrawal of a privatdozent academic teaching license

== See also ==
- Remote access (disambiguation)
- Remoteness (disambiguation), various meanings:
  - Extreme points of Earth § Remoteness, inaccessible places on land and places in the ocean which are far from land
  - Remoteness in English law, the legal concept of how remotely possible a consequence is (or should have been foreseen to be)
