= Luke Charters =

British politician (born 1995)

Luke Charters MP
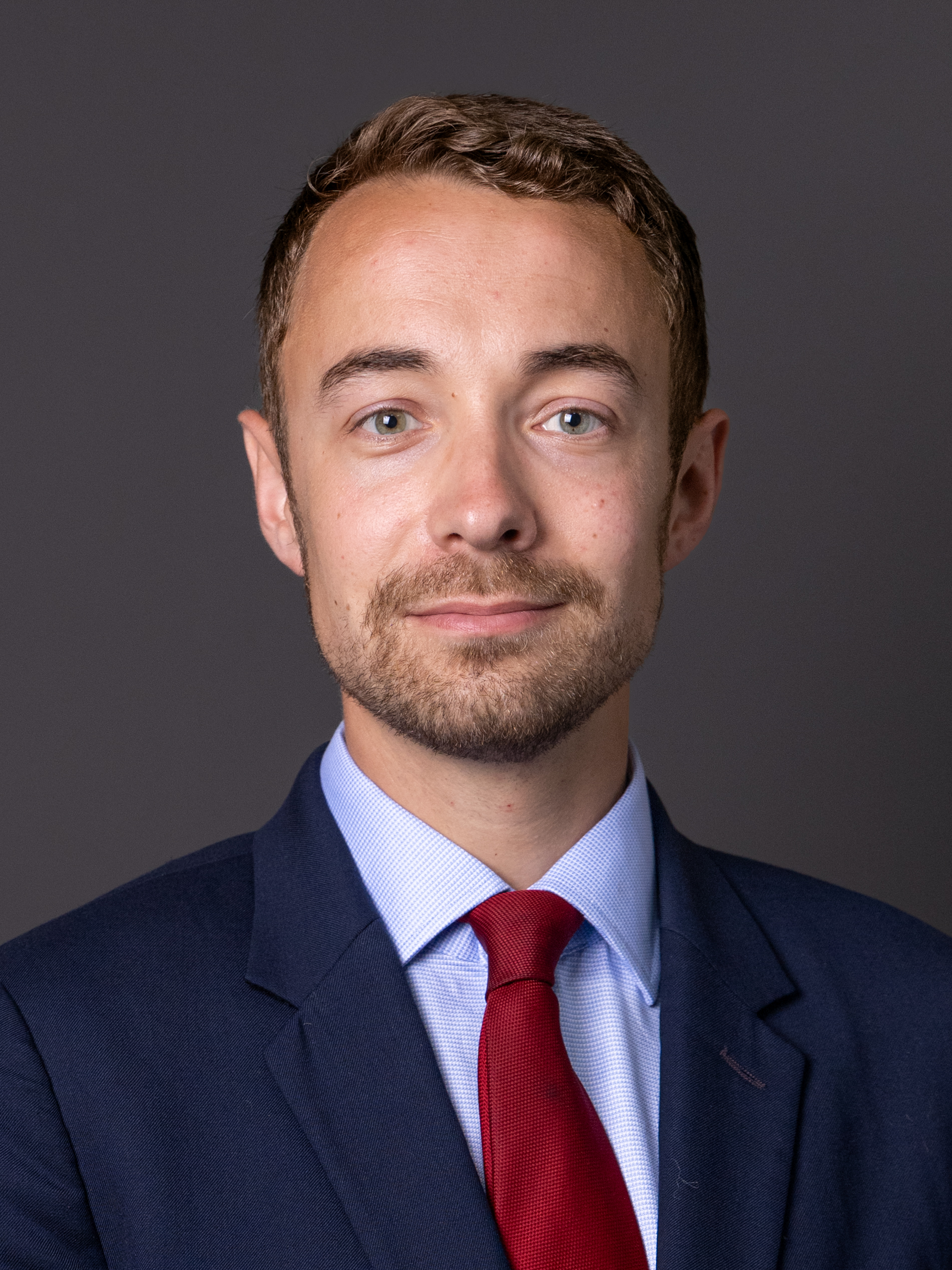
- Official portrait, 2026

Member of Parliament for York Outer
- Incumbent
- Assumed office 4 July 2024
- Preceded by: Julian Sturdy
- Majority: 9,391 (18.4%)

Personal details
- Born: 18 August 1995 (age 31)
- Party: Labour
- Education: Huntington School, York
- Alma mater: Mansfield College, Oxford (BA); University of Chicago; (MSc)
- Website: lukecharters.co.uk

Luke Jonathan Charters (born 18 August 1995) is a British Labour politician elected as Member of Parliament for York Outer in the general election held on 4 July 2024.

== Early life and career ==
=== Early life and education ===
Charters was born on 18 August 1995 in York, North Yorkshire, England. He was educated at Huntington School, a comprehensive school in York. He studied philosophy, politics, and economics at Mansfield College, Oxford, graduating with a Bachelor of Arts (BA) in 2016. He then studied political science at the University of Chicago, graduating with a Master of Science (MSc) degree in 2017.

=== Career ===
Before his political career, Charters worked at the Bank of England and at the Financial Conduct Authority with a focus on fraud. While at the Bank of England, Charters helped with the polymer banknote programme and contributed to the development of new payment infrastructure projects. During the COVID-19 pandemic, Charters stated that he collaborated with the CEOs of several banks to ensure readily available access to cash.

Charters subsequently worked in the fintech industry as a senior manager at the global payroll company Remote and led their fraud and compliance function. In 2021, Charters founded Roots, a cocktail bar in East Village in London.

== Parliamentary career ==
Charters first stood for election for York Outer (as Luke Charters-Reid) as the Labour candidate in the 2017 general election, when he was 21, coming second to the Conservative Party's incumbent MP Julian Sturdy. Charters was subsequently elected as a councillor for the Wall End ward on Newham London Borough Council in 2022 prior to standing in York Outer. He stepped down from the council in 2023.

During the 2024 general election, Charters campaigned on several issues, including the regulation of the bailiff sector, flood defences for York, planning reform, eating disorders in young men, and removing restrictions on investing in UK defence companies. Charters has also campaigned for the creation of a national anti-fraud centre.

Elected with 45% of the vote, a positive swing of 15%, Charters temporarily appointed Labour donor Owen Trotter to set up and run his first parliamentary office. On 17 July 2024, he made his maiden speech in the House of Commons in the debate following the King's Speech and was elected as the chair of the All-Party Parliamentary Group for Food Security.

In October 2024, Charters was elected to the Public Accounts Committee. Previously, Charters served on the Crown Estate Bill Committee. In November 2024, Charters voted in favour of the Terminally Ill Adults (End of Life) Bill, which proposes to legalise assisted suicide. He called for a rail line to be named after Alan Turing. He called for capping ticket prices and alcohol as part of football reform.

In March 2025, Charters held a Westminster Hall debate on "aggressive and unregulated bailiff practices". Later that month, Charters supported cuts to disability benefits, describing this as necessary reform to the existing "cliff-edge welfare system" and was one of 36 signatories in a controversial open letter of support for proposed cuts.

In May 2025, Charters introduced a Private Members' Bill for the regulation of bailiffs "to get a grip on rogue bailiffs", and proposed looking at the ban on alcohol during men's football matches. Charters also serves as the current chair of the FinTech All-Party Parliamentary Group (APPG).

In June 2025, Charters announced that he would be the first male MP to take extended parental leave and employ his office manager as locum during paternity leave. This followed a campaign for improving UK paternity leave that was backed by multiple MPs and the Women and Equalities Committee.

== Political positions ==
Charters was appointed as a Parliamentary Private Secretary to the Department for Business and Trade in September 2025.

=== Student Loans ===
On the 7th January 2026, Charters put forward a Private Members’ Bill which called for a review of maintenance payment schedules for student loans. In his speech, he referred to the current student loans system as “a Frankenstein’s monster” and called Plan 2 loans a "mis-selling scandal waiting to unfold" for graduates. The speech started a national conversation about student debt with significant media coverage, and the bill tabled by Charters was endorsed by the National Union of Students, and numerous students unions across England.

=== 3UP ===
Additionally, Charters became one of the most vocal MPs supporting the National League’s #3UP Campaign on social media, advocating for the EFL to allow three promotion spots from the National League into League Two. As a York City supporter, Charters joined the campaign alongside Rochdale MP, Paul Waugh, with both sides amassing over 100 points in the 2025-2026 National League Season.

=== Youth Triple Lock ===
In May 2026 Charters called for a “youth triple lock” policy which is aimed at supporting the finances of 18–30-year-olds. The proposed policy includes a transport guarantee for under-21s, an Early Career Savings Guarantee Tax and a Rent-to-Own Pathway for over-25s.

== Constituency work ==
=== Haxby Post Office ===
In his home constituency, after a year of campaigning, a new Post Office in Haxby reopened following calls from Charters for a new site to be found. Charters also successfully negotiated an extension to the original Post Office before it closed, and a temporary service in the interim.

== Resignation as Parliamentary Private Secretary ==
On 22 May 2026, Charters resigned as a parliamentary private secretary (PPS) to Business Secretary Peter Kyle. He did not call on Prime Minister Keir Starmer to resign but did cite the poor 2026 local election results. This came following several other resignations from Ministers and Parliamentary Private Secretaries.

=== Endorsement of Andy Burnham ===
Charters was one of the first Labour MPs to endorse Andy Burnham to become the next Prime Minister.

== Personal life ==
Charters has a wife and two children. They named their first son after his religious studies teacher at Huntington School. They had their second son in summer 2025. The family live in his own constituency with two pets.

Parliament of the United Kingdom
Preceded by Julian Sturdy	Member of Parliament for York Outer; 2024–present	Incumbent
