= IoT hacking =

== IoT hacking ==
IoT hacking is the unauthorized access or misuse of internet-connected devices by exploiting their security weaknesses. The Internet of Things (IoT) consists of everyday physical objects such as appliances and smart gadgets that connect to the internet to gather and exchange data, reflecting the continuous expansion of connected technologies worldwide. IoT hacking occurs when unauthorized individuals exploit weak security configurations to control these devices or retrieve personal information. Because compromised home technology directly impacts user privacy and physical safety, securing these systems remains a critical concern.

IoT hacking has developed alongside the growth of connected devices and the increasing use of IoT technology. The History and Evolution section describes how IoT security threats have changed as these devices have become more common and complex.

Smart devices facing a higher risk of security breaches primarily include consumer electronics such as home security cameras and smart locks that monitor private residential spaces. Wearable technology and health devices, including fitness trackers, additionally process sensitive personal and location data that can be targeted. Business and industrial IoT systems similarly rely on connected equipment in commercial environments that remain vulnerable to operational disruptions.

IoT devices can contain security weaknesses in their software, network connections, authentication systems, and data protection. The Common IoT Vulnerabilities and Weaknesses section explains the common vulnerabilities that can make IoT devices easier to compromise. Attackers can use different techniques to exploit vulnerable IoT devices, gain unauthorized access, or interfere with their normal operation. The Common Hacking Methods and Attacks section describes the common methods and attacks used against IoT systems.

Security standards and best practices are important to keep devices, networks and data safe from security threats. IoT security and privacy play an important role nowadays because the connected devices can gather, keep and share data which encourages cyberattacks. Vulnerable passwords, old software and weak privacy protection should be highly supervised. Moreover, following strong security recommendations and protection methods help reduce the risks. Therefore, understanding IoT security is necessary for developers, organizations, and users as the use of connected devices continues to grow and cyber threats become more critical.

== Introduction and definition ==
=== Concept of the Internet of Things ===
The Internet of Things (IoT) describes physical objects equipped with sensors, embedded software, and network interfaces that exchange data with other devices and cloud platforms over the internet. Unlike general-purpose personal computers or smartphones that rely on direct human interaction, IoT devices operate largely autonomously measuring environmental conditions, communicating with remote servers, and executing physical actions automatically. Common implementations range from residential thermostats and wearable fitness monitors to connected vehicles and industrial telemetry sensor.

=== Nature of IoT hacking ===
IoT Hacking is the unauthorized access, manipulation, or disruption of internet-connected embedded systems. Threat actors target these devices with three primary objectives: hijacking hardware functions, exfiltrating sensitive personal or operational data, or weaponizing compromised devices to launch broader network attacks. Attack vectors in IoT environments frequently target the gap between hardware constraints and network exposure. International cybersecurity frameworks, including guidelines from the National Institute of Standards and Technology (NIST) and the Open Worldwide Application Security Project (OWASP), attribute the prevalence of IoT breaches to weak authentication controls, exposed network interfaces, and the absence of automated security update mechanisms. In particular, many devices remain vulnerable simply because users never change the default passwords.

=== Everyday security and privacy implications ===
Security breaches in consumer and enterprise IoT devices carry both digital and physical consequences. Because smart devices share local area networks with higher-value systems, a single compromised gadget such as a smart television or wireless printer can serve as an initial entry point for lateral movement, allowing attackers to bypass perimeter firewalls and reach personal computers or corporate servers. Furthermore, connected sensors continuously record granular data about human behavior, including household occupancy patterns, biometric health metrics, and real-time geolocation.

Unauthorized interception of these data streams compromises personal privacy, while unauthorized command execution on physical actuators such as automated door locks, residential cameras, or medical delivery system translates digital vulnerabilities directly into physical safety hazards.

Because these security breaches threaten both digital privacy and physical safety, securing IoT environments requires effort from both device manufacturers and consumers.

== History and evolution ==
=== Early development of smart connected devices ===
A 2008 technology roadmap illustrating anticipated developments in the Internet of Things.

The development of the Internet of Things (IoT) began with the idea of connecting everyday physical objects to computer networks. One early example was a Coca-Cola vending machine at Carnegie Mellon University in the 1980s, which allowed users to check the availability and temperature of drinks remotely. In 1990, John Romkey demonstrated an internet-connected toaster that could be controlled through a computer network. These early experiments showed how ordinary devices could communicate and be controlled remotely.

The term Internet of Things was introduced by Kevin Ashton in 1999 while discussing the use of radio-frequency identification (RFID) technology to track physical objects. As internet connections and wireless technologies became more widely available, connected devices gradually expanded into homes, businesses, and industrial environments. However, the growing number of connected devices also introduced new cybersecurity concerns, including unauthorized access and weaknesses in device communication.

=== Major milestones and historical IoT security incidents ===
As IoT technology became more common, security vulnerabilities began to affect large numbers of connected devices. One significant incident involved the Mirai malware in 2016, which compromised large numbers of internet-connected devices and became associated with major cyberattacks.

In October 2016, a Mirai-related botnet was used in a distributed denial-of-service (DDoS) attack that affected the domain name service provider Dyn. The attack interrupted access to several popular websites and demonstrated how insecure IoT devices could be used to disrupt major internet services.

Following these incidents, IoT security received greater attention from cybersecurity organizations and device manufacturers. Organizations such as the National Institute of Standards and Technology (NIST) and the European Telecommunications Standards Institute (ETSI) developed guidelines addressing device authentication, software updates, and secure communication.

== Common types of IoT devices at risk ==
=== Smart home appliances and security cameras ===
Compromises in smart home environments typically occur through two main pathway: weak local authentication (such as credentials stuffing or unpatched web interfaces) and vulnerabilities in backend cloud infrastructure. Flaws in cloud application programming interfaces (APIs) or session management can inadvertently expose live camera feeds and user accounts data across separate customer accounts.

To mitigate residential risks, cybersecurity agencies such as Cybersecurity and Infrastructure Security Agency (CISA) and the European Telecommunications Standards Institute (ETSI) recommend enforcing multi-factor authentication (MFA), enabling automatic firmware updates, and segmenting smart home gadgets onto isolated guest Wi-Fi networks.

=== Wearable technology and health devices ===
Wearable electronics and connected medical equipment such as smartwatches, fitness trackers, wireless pacemakers, and automated insulin pumps collect physiological and location data directly from the human body. To preserve battery life and maintain a compact from factor, these portable devices frequently rely on low-power short-range wireless protocols, such as Bluetooth Low Energy (BLE). When wireless pairing and data transmission are not properly encrypted, nearby attacker can eavesdrop on communications, track user movements, or intercept sensitive health metrics. In clinical and home healthcare settings, vulnerabilities in connected medical devices (often in termed the Internet of Medical Things (IoMT)) pose direct risks to patient life and safety.

Weaknesses in device authentication or wireless command verification can allow an unauthorized party within radio range to alter diagnostic reading or issue dangerous dosing commands to patient-care equipment.

Security risks also extend beyond the physical device to external cloud platforms and connected applications. Because wearable electronics have limited processing power and small batteries, device makers often face challenges in implementing advanced hardware protection, leaving stored health records vulnerable if central servers are misconfigured.

=== Industrial and business IoT systems ===
In commercial, manufacturing, and utility sectors, the Industrial Internet of Things ((IIoT) integrates networked sensors and remote telemetry units to automate supply chains, monitors equipment health, and manage critical infrastructure. Because IIoT sensors bridge physical operational technology (OT) with central corporate information technology (IT) networks, a breach in a single filed sensor can allow threat actors to pivot into core industrial control system (ICS). Industrial environments are prime targets for state-sponsored cyberattacks and ransomware campaigns designed to halt production lines and extort organizations. In critical water infrastructure, cyberattacks can disrupt automated operations and force operators to shut down digital services to safeguard essential public water supplies. Additionally, many factories connect modern IoT sensors to old legacy machinery that was never designed with internet security in mind. Because pausing active machines for security updates causes costly operational downtime, these system often remain vulnerable too physical disruption and remote extortion.

== Common IoT vulnerabilities and weaknesses ==
=== Insecure default passwords and credential management ===
Many IoT devices are vulnerable because they use weak, default, or hardcoded passwords. Some manufacturers provide the same login credentials for multiple devices, while users may continue using these passwords without changing them.

Poor credential management also increases security risks. The OWASP Internet of Things Top 10 identifies weak and hardcoded passwords as one of the major security risks affecting IoT devices. Security guidelines recommend unique passwords and appropriate authentication mechanisms to prevent unauthorized access.

=== Firmware and software flaws ===
IoT devices depend on firmware and software to control their hardware functions and network communication. Vulnerabilities in these components can allow attackers to access device information, execute unauthorized commands, or interfere with normal operations. Some devices also use outdated software libraries that contain publicly known security weaknesses.

Attackers may examine firmware or software components to identify weaknesses that can be exploited. OWASP identifies insecure or outdated components as a common IoT security risk, while NIST recommends cybersecurity capabilities that help protect device software and configurations.

==== Risks of outdated firmware and missing update mechanisms ====
Outdated firmware creates security risks when known vulnerabilities remain unpatched. Some IoT manufacturers do not provide regular security updates, while certain devices lack a mechanism for installing updates securely. This can allow attackers to continue exploiting vulnerabilities even after security fixes become available.

According to OWASP, a lack of secure update mechanisms includes problems such as missing firmware validation and insecure delivery of software updates. If a device does not verify the authenticity of an update, it may become vulnerable to unauthorized software modifications. NIST and ETSI recommend secure update capabilities to help maintain device security throughout its supported lifetime.

=== Insecure network services and interfaces ===
IoT devices communicate through network services and interfaces to exchange information with other devices, applications, and cloud systems. However, unnecessary or poorly secured services can create additional entry points for attackers. For example, a smart camera that exposes its administration interface directly to the internet may become vulnerable to unauthorized access if proper authentication is not implemented.

Security weaknesses may also exist in web interfaces, mobile applications, and cloud connections used to manage IoT devices. Poor access controls or unencrypted communication can expose sensitive information and allow attackers to interfere with device operations. OWASP identifies insecure network services and ecosystem interfaces as important IoT security concerns. Reducing unnecessary services, restricting network access, and protecting communications can help minimize these risks.

== Common hacking methods and attacks ==
=== Botnets and malware infection (e.g., Mirai) ===
Illustration of how compromised computers communicate with a botnet controller and carry out malicious activities.

A botnet is a group of compromised devices controlled by an attacker through a network. IoT devices can become part of a botnet when malware infects their software and allows an attacker to issue remote commands. Compromised devices may continue performing their normal functions while also carrying out malicious activities without the owner's knowledge.

One well-known example is the Mirai botnet, which targeted vulnerable IoT devices. Mirai searched for vulnerable devices and attempted to access them using commonly used default usernames and passwords. After infection, the compromised devices could be used together to generate large amounts of malicious network traffic.

=== Denial-of-Service (DoS) and Distributed Denial-of-Service (DDoS) attacks ===
A denial-of-service (DoS) attack attempts to make a network, website, or service unavailable to legitimate users by overwhelming its resources. A distributed denial-of-service (DDoS) attack uses multiple compromised devices to send traffic or requests toward the same target. IoT botnets are commonly associated with these attacks because large numbers of infected devices can operate together.

Such attacks demonstrate that compromised IoT devices can affect not only their owners but also other organizations and internet services. Devices with weak authentication and exposed network services may be recruited into botnets and used for similar attacks.

=== Unauthorized remote access and data interception ===
Unauthorized remote access occurs when an attacker gains control of an IoT device without permission. Attackers may exploit security weaknesses to access device functions and information. For example, an improperly secured smart camera may allow an unauthorized user to change device settings or view private recordings.

Data interception is another security threat affecting IoT systems. Connected devices often transmit information between sensors, mobile applications, and cloud platforms. If these communications are not properly protected, attackers with access to the communication path may capture sensitive information, including personal data and device activity.

Insecure communication can also expose authentication information or allow unauthorized modification of transmitted data. NIST and ETSI recommend data protection, secure communication, and access controls to reduce these risks. Such security measures are particularly important for devices that collect private information or control physical systems.

== Security standards and best practices ==
=== Industry frameworks and guidelines ===
There are six main cybersecurity measures for consumer IoT devices, backed by ETSI. They include avoiding universal default passwords, handling reports of security vulnerabilities, keeping software updated, securely storing sensitive information, protecting communications (between IoT devices, networks, and other systems), and minimizing attack points that attackers could exploit.

Attackers access multiple devices using the same default passwords. Therefore, a smart camera, for example, requires a unique password from its owner during setup. On the other hand, manufacturers should give a way for cybersecurity researchers and users to report vulnerabilities immediately. Manufacturers should also provide regular software updates to resolve vulnerabilities and maintain the security.

Passwords, authentication keys and other sensitive information ought to be stored securely. A smart lock, in particular, stores its authentication keys in storage like a secure hardware component. IoT devices should exchange information safely. For instance, a smart camera can encrypt video to its mobile application to protect the video data. Encrypting makes the transmission of the video information to not be accessed by the attackers. Unused network interfaces and services shall be disabled as well. For example, blocking inactive network ensures the network is not exposed over the public internet.

=== Encryption and basic security countermeasures ===
Encryption protects information transmitted between IoT devices. NIST recommends protecting stored and transmitted data from unauthorized access and modification such as a smart meter having electricity-usage readings which will be securely sent to the utility provider and a health-monitoring device that stores patient data and send encrypted data to an authorized healthcare application.

=== Best practices for manufacturers and everyday users ===
Manufacturers should integrate security into the design of IoT devices, put a feature to report vulnerabilities, keep software updated and encrypt personal data. They should also reduce unnecessary services like disabling unused network services to reduce attack points or CCTV having its local network for administration interface instead of making it directly from the internet.

Users are encouraged to change default passwords, install available updates, check privacy settings and disable unnecessary features because OWASP confirms weak passwords, insecure network and outdated software are common IoT risks.

== Significance ==
=== Current IoT security challenges ===
There are great challenges due to the fast development of Internet of Things (IoT) technologies for its security. Nowadays, billions of devices are used worldwide that includes smart home appliances, cameras, routers, medical devices, and industrial equipment. As the number of connected devices rises, more potential entry points happen, and demand IoT networks’ protection.

A serious challenge occurred with the rising number of cyberattacks in IoT technology. In this case, some data from Bitdefender's IoT Security Landscape Report demonstrates that there were around 13.6 billion attacks from January to October 2025. This study refers to information coming from millions of devices and proves how easy it is for cybercriminals to exploit device weaknesses.

For instance, in March 2026, an international operation designed to close four major IoT botnets was announced by the US Department of Justice. The botnets had infected thousands of systems worldwide which includes routers, cameras, and DVRs. Attackers used the hacked devices to launch Distributed Denial-of-Service (DDoS) attacks, which affect targeted networks and online services with large amounts of traffic. This incident shows how vulnerable IoT devices can be exploited to carry out large-scale cyberattacks.

=== Future outlook for secure connected technologies ===
According to NIST, as IoT (Internet of Things) grows, security needs continued cooperation between manufacturers, users, and organizations. Considering security requirements, improving privacy and updating devices throughout their supported lifetimes can reduce potential attacks, and can later build greater confidence in IoT technology.
