= Remoteness =

Remoteness may refer to:

- Remote (location), inaccessible places on land and places in the ocean which are far from land
- Distance
- Remoteness (legal), the legal concept of how remotely possible a consequence is (or should have been foreseen to be)

== See also ==
- Remote (disambiguation)
