= Julian Sturdy =

British farmer and politician (born 1971)

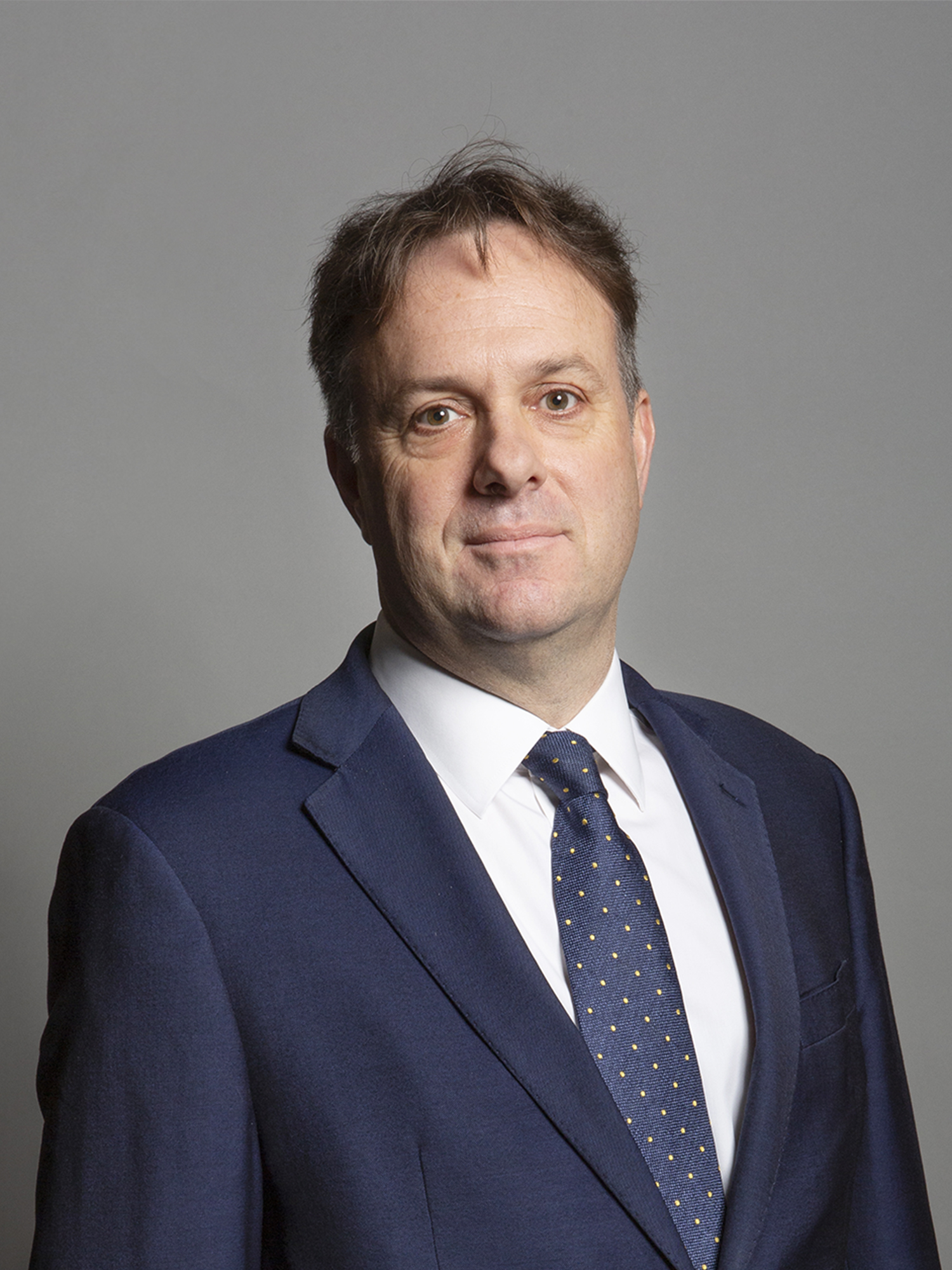
- Official portrait, 2019

Member of Parliament for York Outer
- In office 6 May 2010 – 30 May 2024
- Preceded by: Constituency created
- Succeeded by: Luke Charters

Member of Harrogate Borough Council for Marston Moor
- In office 2 May 2002 – 3 May 2007
- Preceded by: John Dickinson
- Succeeded by: John Savage

Personal details
- Born: 3 June 1971 (age 55)
- Party: Conservative
- Spouse: Victoria
- Education: Harper Adams University
- Website: www.juliansturdy.co.uk

Julian Charles Sturdy (born 3 June 1971) is a British Conservative Party politician and farmer. He served as Member of Parliament (MP) for York Outer from 2010 to 2024.

== Early life and career ==
Sturdy grew up in Yorkshire, England. From 1981 to 1989, he was privately educated at Ashville College, in Harrogate, North Yorkshire. He then studied at Harper Adams Agricultural College close to the village of Edgmond (near to the market town of Newport, Shropshire). He is a farmer.

== Political career ==
Prior to entering Parliament, Sturdy served as a Harrogate councillor, between 2002 and 2007. He stood as the Conservative Party candidate for Scunthorpe in the 2005 general election, finishing second with 25.7% of the vote.

First elected to the House of Commons as Member of Parliament for York Outer in the 2010 general election with a majority of 3,688, Sturdy became a member of the Transport Select Committee in July that year.

In 2012, Sturdy was appointed as Parliamentary Private Secretary to the then Transport Minister, Simon Burns.

Sturdy successfully introduced a private member's bill introducing new procedures for handling horses abandoned or left to graze on others' land. The Control of Horses Bill passed into law in 2015 and was welcomed by the British Horse Society.

He was re-elected in the 2017 general election with 51.1 per cent of votes cast.

He has a mixed voting record in Parliament on the issue of regulating fracking, with two votes against greater environmental controls and two votes for more conditions and restrictions on where it can take place.

In December 2023, Sturdy was one of 22 Conservative Members of Parliament to rebel in support of Diana Johnson's New Clause 27 to the Victim and Prisoner's Bill to speed up compensation to victims of the Infected Blood Scandal. The amendment passed by 4 votes - the first defeat of Rishi Sunak's premiership. In the 2019-2024 Parliament, Sturdy was in the top 50 most rebellious Conservative Members of Parliament.

Sturdy chaired the All-Party Parliamentary Groups on Antimicrobial Resistance (AMR) and Science and Technology in Agriculture during the 2019 - 2024 Parliament. Between 2017 - 2024, Sturdy served on the Environment, Food, and Rural Affairs Select Committee in Parliament.

In 2019 The People-Power Index, from Change.org, ranked all of the country's 650 MPs based on a number of criteria, including their availability to constituents, participation in Parliament and whether they listen to the public. Julian ranked at number 53 out of 54 in Yorkshire (nationally ranked 630th).

Following the publication of the Sue Gray report, Sturdy called for the resignation of Prime Minister Boris Johnson. In 2022, Sturdy supported Rishi Sunak for leader of the Conservative Party and Prime Minister.

Sturdy was unseated at the 2024 general election, losing his seat to Labour candidate Luke Charters, by a majority of 9,361.

== Post-parliamentary career ==
Following his defeat at the 2024 UK General Election, Study has served as Chair of the Red Tractor Combinable Crops & Sugar Beet Board.

== Personal life ==
Sturdy is divorced and has two children. The family live in North Yorkshire. Sturdy's then-wife, Victoria, was caught drink driving in 2018 collecting her children from school. Sturdy's father is Robert Sturdy, a former Conservative Party MEP.

Parliament of the United Kingdom
New constituency	Member of Parliament for York Outer; 2010–2024	Succeeded by Luke Charters
