= Apple Remote =

Remote control introduced by Apple Inc

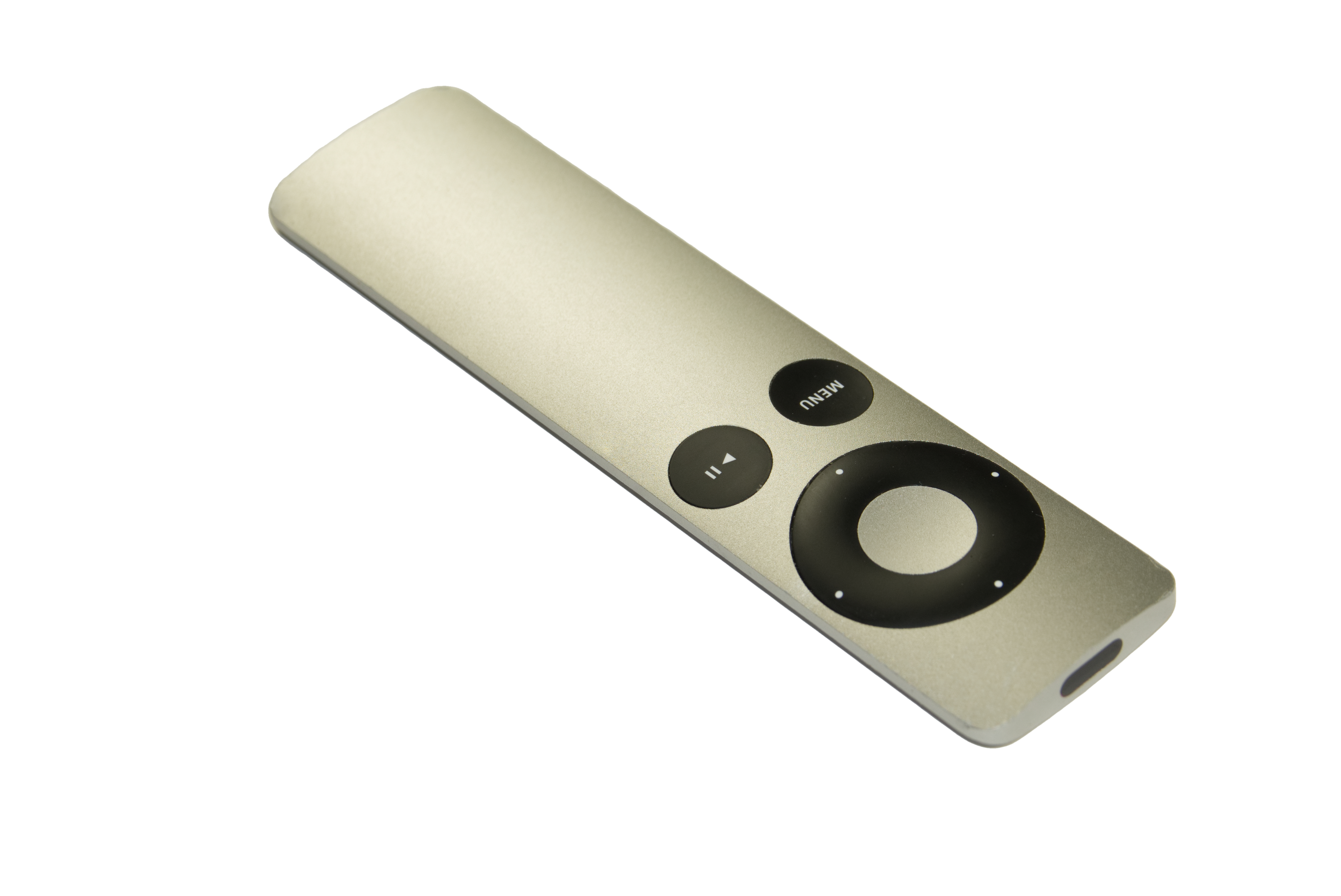
- The second-generation Apple Remote, released in October 2009
- Developer: Apple Inc.
- Type: Infrared remote
- Released: October 12, 2005 (first generation); October 20, 2009 (second generation)
- Successor: Siri Remote

The Apple Remote is a remote control introduced in October 2005 by Apple Inc. for use with a number of its products with infrared capability. It was originally designed to control the Front Row media center program on the iMac G5 and is compatible with many subsequent Macintosh computers. The first three generations of Apple TV used the Apple Remote as their primary control mechanism. It has now been replaced with the Siri Remote in the fourth generation. Prior to the Apple Remote, Apple produced several nameless IR remotes for products such as the Macintosh TV, TV tuner expansion boards, and the PowerCD drive.

== Design ==
=== Plastic (2005) ===
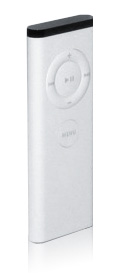
Original Apple Remote (2005)

The original Apple Remote was designed with six buttons and made of white plastic. Its shape and layout resembled the first-generation iPod Shuffle. A circular Play/Pause/Select button sat in the center of a larger four-button circle (clockwise): Volume Up, Next/Fast-forward, Volume Down, and Previous/Rewind. A separate Menu button was positioned below. Size - 83*32*8 mm. The price was set at US$29.00.

=== Aluminum (2009) ===
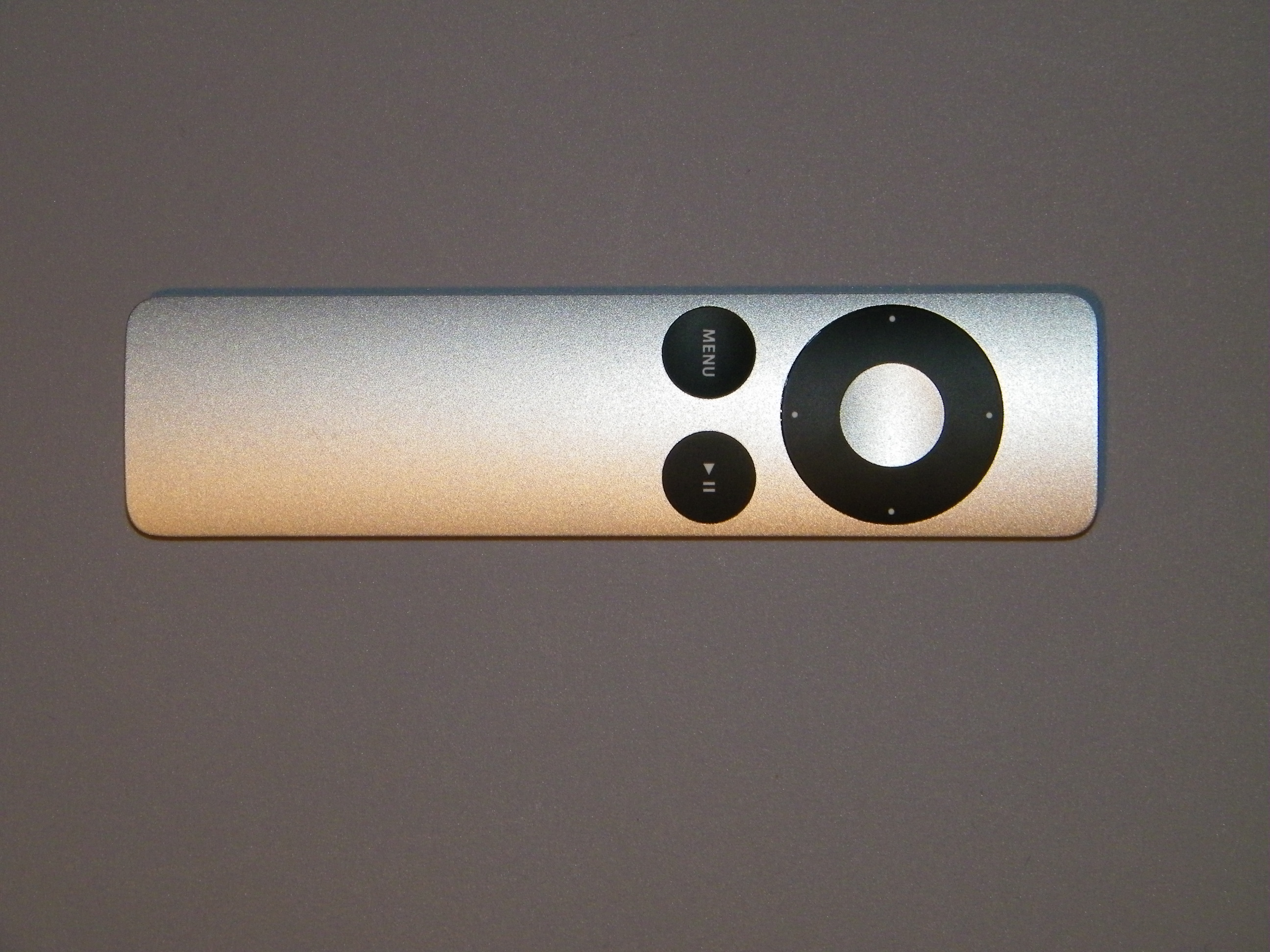
Apple Remote Aluminium (2009)

In October 2009, the remote was redesigned as a thinner and longer aluminum version. The new remote was released along with the 27- inch aluminum iMacs and multi-touch Magic Mouse. The Play/Pause button was moved out of the center of the directional buttons and put beside the Menu button (under the directional buttons). The symbols for the Volume Up/Down and Next/Fast-forward buttons were replaced with small dots, to make it clear that the buttons were also used to move up, down, left, and right within menus. Along with the new design, the price was dropped to US$19.99. In earlier aluminum remotes, the navigation ring was flush with the curvature of the remote's aluminum body. In the later revision, the ring is slightly raised to make it easier to locate the ring by touch.

Replacement of the CR2032 battery in the original remote is done with a small pointed object such as a paper clip at the bottom right edge of the device, where the battery slides out on a tray. The newer version has the battery located behind a compartment in the middle of the device which is accessed by turning a coin in the compartment door's indent.

== Functions ==
The Apple Remote's original function was to enable navigation in Front Row, which allows users to browse and play music, view videos (DVDs and downloaded files) and browse photos. Although Front Row was removed from OS X 10.7 and later, some Apple software still works with the remote. It can still be used to control presentations in Apple Keynote, slide shows in iPhoto and Aperture, DVD films via DVD Player, and to play video, and audio in iTunes and QuickTime. Other software that is still compatible includes Elgato's EyeTV 3.5, and VLC media player. The remote can also be used to run presentations in Microsoft PowerPoint 2008.

Other functions controlled by the remote can include putting a device into sleep mode, selecting a partition to boot from on startup, and ejecting optical discs. A device can be configured to respond only to a particular remote.

=== iPods ===
An iPod placed in a dock featuring an IR sensor can be used with the remote for music and media control. The iPod's menus cannot be operated with the remote. The Apple Remote can also be used to control the iPod Hi-Fi or third-party devices tailored to it.

=== Boot Camp ===
Starting with Boot Camp 1.2, the remote has some functionality when a user is running Windows. If iTunes is installed on the Windows partition, pressing the Menu button on the remote will start the program. The remote's media controls also support Windows Media Player, as well as system volume control. Other third-party programs may also utilize the remote's capabilities; media applications such as foobar2000 and Media Player Classic allow users to control their functions via the remote. Applications must be in focus for the remote to control them. Boot Camp 5, released on March 14, 2013, also includes drivers for the remote control.

== iOS app ==
Apple offers a free 'Remote' app for iOS devices (available in the Apple App Store) which allows for wireless control of iTunes on Mac/Windows computers or the Apple TV.

== Siri Remote ==
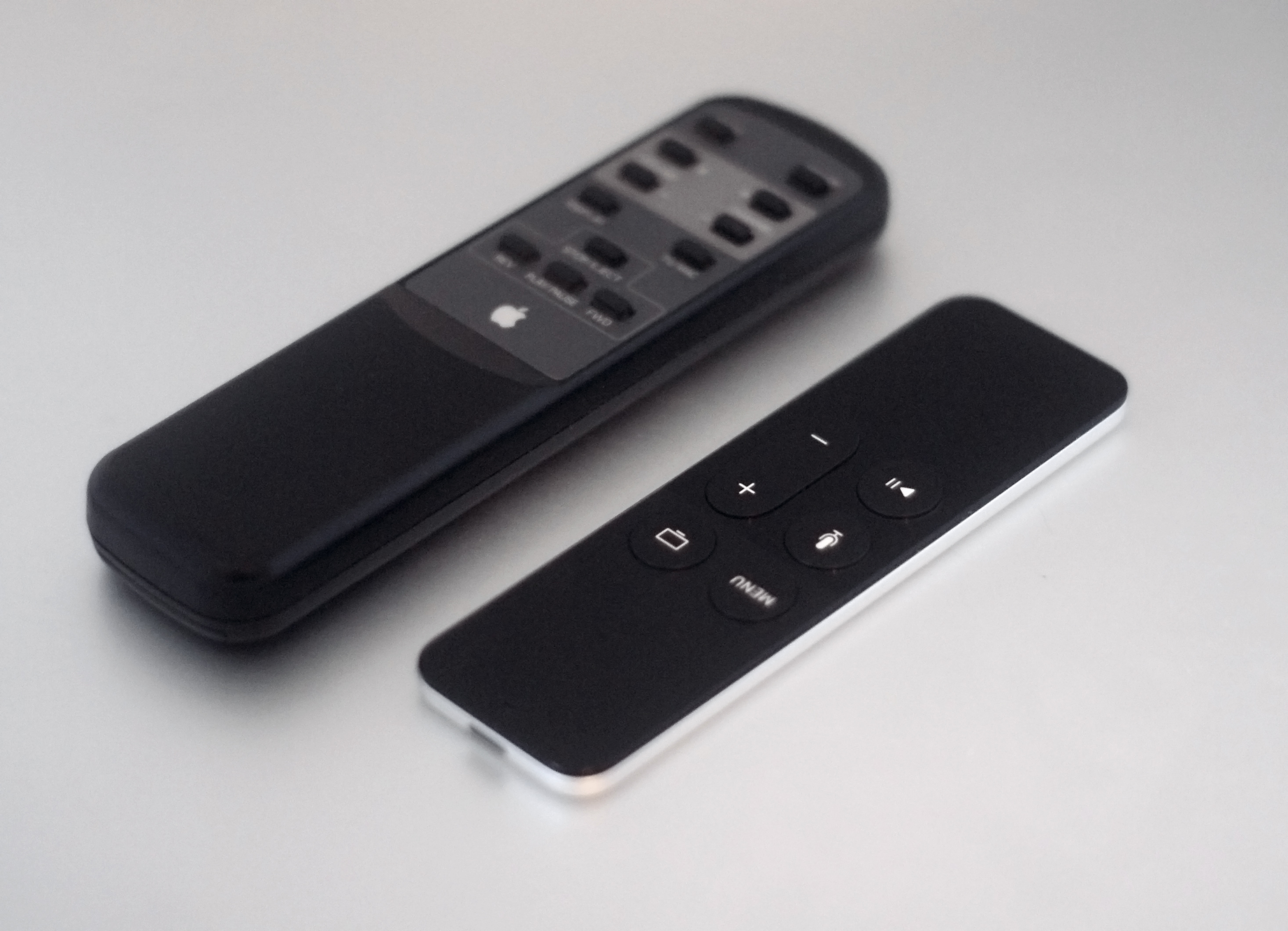
First-generation Siri Remote (right)

The Siri Remote was launched with the 4th generation Apple TV in 2015. It uses both IR and Bluetooth to communicate with the Apple TV. The remote has a trackpad, dual microphones, five buttons for menu, home, Siri and play/pause, and a volume up/down rocker button. Additionally it has an accelerometer (IMU) and a gyroscope which allows the remote to be used as a gaming controller for tvOS apps and games. The remote (unlike previous generations) uses a built-in rechargeable Lithium Polymer Battery that is charged through a lightning port at the bottom of the remote. In regions where Siri is not supported, the Siri Remote is known as the Apple TV Remote.

On September 12, 2017, together with the Apple TV 4K, Apple announced an updated Siri Remote, with a raised white border around the menu button and additional motion input for apps.

== Compatibility ==
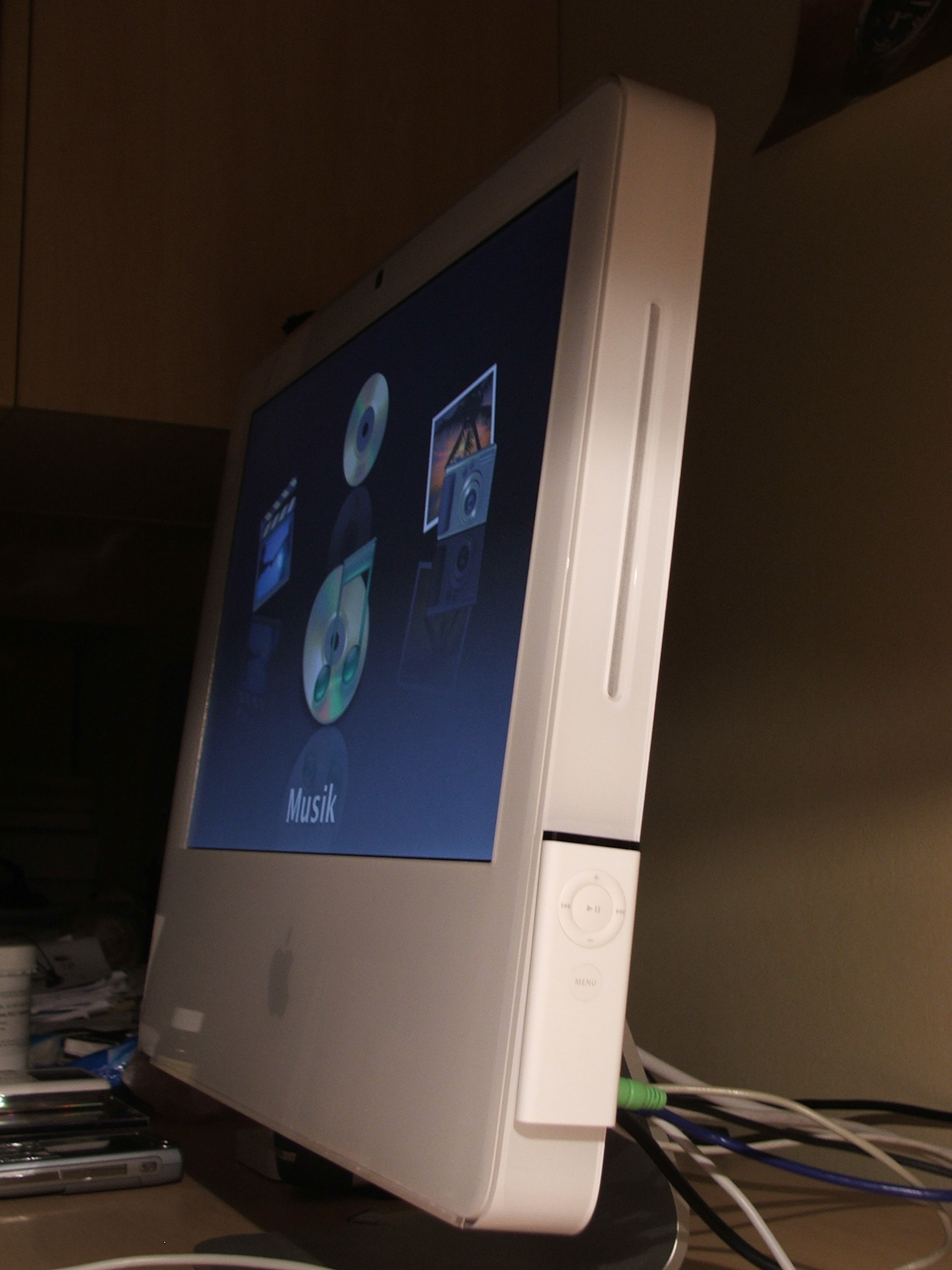

Macintosh compatibility (devices with suitable IR receivers)
Model	Compatibility
MacBook	Original – Mid 2009 (Except White Unibody)
MacBook Air	Original – Mid 2009
MacBook Pro	Original – Mid 2012 (Except Retina)
iMac	G5 iSight – Mid 2011
Mac mini	Early 2006 – Late 2014
Mac Pro	None
Mac Studio	None

Earlier models of the iMac with polycarbonate enclosures featured a magnetic rest for the remote, which was later removed.

=== Use with new MacBook Airs, Retina MacBook Pros and older Macs ===
Using the Apple Remote with newer MacBook Air, Retina MacBook, or other Mac models without a built-in IR receiver requires a USB-based infrared receiver and additional software from a third party.

Using Remote Buddy (from IOSPIRIT GmbH) or mira (from Twisted Melon), it is possible to connect an external USB receiver such as the Windows Media Center Edition eHome receiver, and use the Apple Remote on these machines with full support for sleep, pairing, low-battery detection and controlling a variety of Apple and third-party software. In addition, Remote Buddy is able to emulate events of an Apple Remote on these systems, enabling users to use software written for the Apple Remote in exactly the same way as with Macs that have a built-in infrared receiver.

For the Apple computers without built-in infrared receiver, there exists a miniature USB receiver (USB-A or USB-C versions), the SmartGUS, which allows to retrofit the infrared functionality to iMac, MacBook and Mac Pro. In this case, all compatible software (iTunes, Keynote, PowerPoint, OpenOffice Impress, QuickTime Player, iPhoto, VLC, Kodi, Remote Buddy, Mira ...) can use the features of the Apple Remote, the same as with the legacy built-in infrared receiver. Using the Apple Remote with a USB receiver on Apple Silicon-based Macs requires installation a third-party software utility which simulates keyboard input.

== Infrared interference ==
Because many electrical appliances use infrared remote (IR) controls, concurrent use of the Apple Remote with other IR remotes may scramble communications and generate interference, preventing stable use. Remotes should be used individually to circumvent the problem.

== Technical details ==
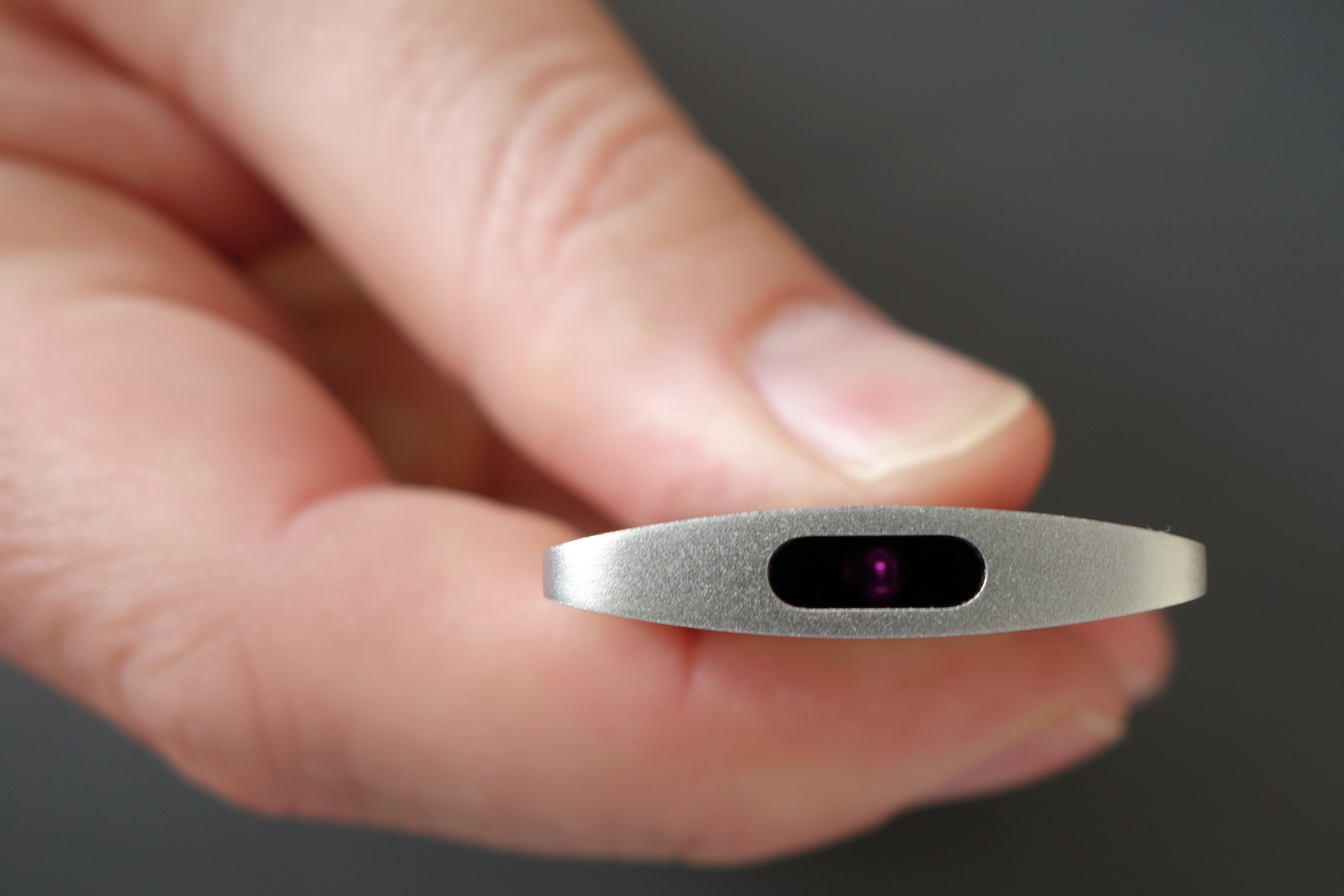
Apple Remote 2nd generation with lit infrared LED

The Apple Remote uses a modified NEC IR protocol which consists of a differential PPM encoding on a 1:3 duty cycle 38 kHz 950 nm infrared carrier. There are 32 bits of encoded data between the AGC leader and the stop bit:

Protocol	on (μs)	off (μs)	total (μs)
leader	9000	4500	13500
0 bit	560	560	1120
1 bit	560	1690	2250
stop	560	—N/a	560

The first two bytes sent are the Apple custom code ID (0xEE followed by 0x87), which are followed by a one byte command and a one byte remote ID (0-255) making a total of 32 bits of data. All bytes are sent least significant bit first. The least significant bit of the command byte is a parity bit over the command byte and the ID byte. The commands consist of:

Value	Button	Command
0x01	Menu	Menu
0x2e followed by 0x02	Center	Select
0x03	Right	Next/Fast-Forward
0x04	Left	Previous/Rewind
0x05	Up	Volume Up
0x06	Down	Volume Down
0x2f followed by 0x02	Play/Pause	Play/Pause

The aluminium Apple remote control has 7 buttons; the extra button is a play/pause button and sends the same code as the center button. However, both these buttons prepend their code with another 32 bit sequence containing the commands 0x2f and 0x2e, respectively.

== See also ==
- Siri Remote
- Apple TV
- Front Row
- iTunes Remote
- Remote control
