= Remote access =

Remote access may refer to:

- Connection to a data-processing system from a remote location, for example, through a remote access service or virtual private network
- Remote desktop software, software allowing applications to run remotely on a server while displaying graphical output locally
- Terminal emulation, when used to interface with a remote system. May use standard tools like:
  - telnet, – software used to interact over a network with a computer system
  - ssh – secure shell: often used with remote applications
- Activation of features of a business telephone system from outside the business's premises
- RemoteAccess, a DOS-based bulletin-board system
- Remote Database Access, a protocol standard for database access
- Remote Access (film), a 2004 Russian drama film

== See also ==
- Remote (disambiguation)
