= ITunes Remote =

iOS app to control iTunes/Apple TV media over WiFi

iTunes Remote

- iTunes Remote running on iPhone 6
- Developer: Apple Inc.
- Release: October 7, 2008
- Stable release: 4.4 / June 27, 2018; 8 years ago
- Operating system: iOS 9.0 and later
- Size: 13.8 MB
- License: Freeware
- Website: www.apple.com

iTunes Remote (also known simply as Remote) is a software application developed by Apple Inc. for iOS devices that allows for remote control of Apple TV or iTunes library in an area with Wi-Fi connectivity using the proprietary Digital Audio Control Protocol (DACP). It is currently available as a free download from the App Store for iOS devices such as iPhone, iPod Touch, iPad, and Apple Watch.

== History ==
On July 10, 2008, Apple released iTunes Remote app on the App Store. That same day, Apple released the Apple TV 2.1 software update that added recognition for the iPhone and iPod Touch as remote control devices. Later revisions added support for the iPad, and introduced support for new features as they were added to iTunes. The remote application was intended as a software alternative to the Apple Remote, allowing users to control their media collection via their iOS device.

=== Patent filing ===
Unofficial software modifications for including this functionality in both iOS and the Apple TV OS had existed previously, but rumors of Apple giving remote control capabilities between iOS and Apple TV had existed since early 2007, when the U.S. Patent Office published a patent filed by Apple on September 11, 2006 that depicted a "media-player with remote control capabilities" alongside a "multi-media center for computing systems".

== Features ==
=== History ===
The initial release, version 1.0, allowed users to control the basic functions of their media library, limited to much the same functions of the physical Apple Remote Later revisions of version 1 added the ability to create and edit playlists in iTunes, search the user's media library, and generate Genius playlists. These features were further improved with the release of version 2.0, which added support for the iPad and the then new retina display. Features added in version 2.0 included support for Shared Libraries, and control of AirPlay hardware. Gestures were also supported, allowing users to control their Apple TVs with swipes similar to the navigation through Cover Flow.

Subsequent updates to version 2 improved stability of the application, and added AirPlay video support to Apple TVs. Version 2.1 also allowed users to control the internet radio feature of iTunes, and play rented movies or TV shows. Other additions to later releases of version 2 included support for the new iTunes Match feature, and support for iOS 5 and 6. Version 2 also allowed guests connected to a wireless network to request songs to be played using iTunes DJ. The interface was designed to emulate the iOS Music app when used on an iPhone or iPod Touch, whilst iPad users controlled their library using an interface based on the desktop iTunes application.

=== Current version ===
With the release of iTunes 11, Apple updated the iTunes Remote application. The new version, which is compatible with most newer iPhone hardware, included a new user interface; emulating the iOS 6 Music application on iPhone and iPod Touch, and iTunes 11's new grid view on iPad. In accordance with the removal of iTunes DJ from the desktop software, the application no longer provides the function for guest to request songs. New features include the ability to see and edit the Up Next list, and an improved dynamic search function that searches content as the user types. This version removes support for users running iOS 4, instead requiring a minimum of iOS 5.0. Users can play, pause, or skip back and forth through their collection. They can also create or edit playlists, generate Genius results, and control the output volume of iTunes or the selected AirPlay device. When multiple iTunes libraries or Apple TVs are found one network, users can select which one they wish to control, and swap between them. Currently, no more than one library at a time can be manually added; this effectively forces any user with two or more devices to enable Home Sharing if they wish to use a single remote for all those devices.

tvOS 9.1 (released on December 9, 2015), in addition to the 4.2.3 Remote app update for iOS and WatchOS, returned basic app functionality to the 4th generation Apple TV; text input, navigation, and control.

== See also ==
- Apple TV
- iTunes
