= Apple TV (device) =

Home media streaming device from Apple

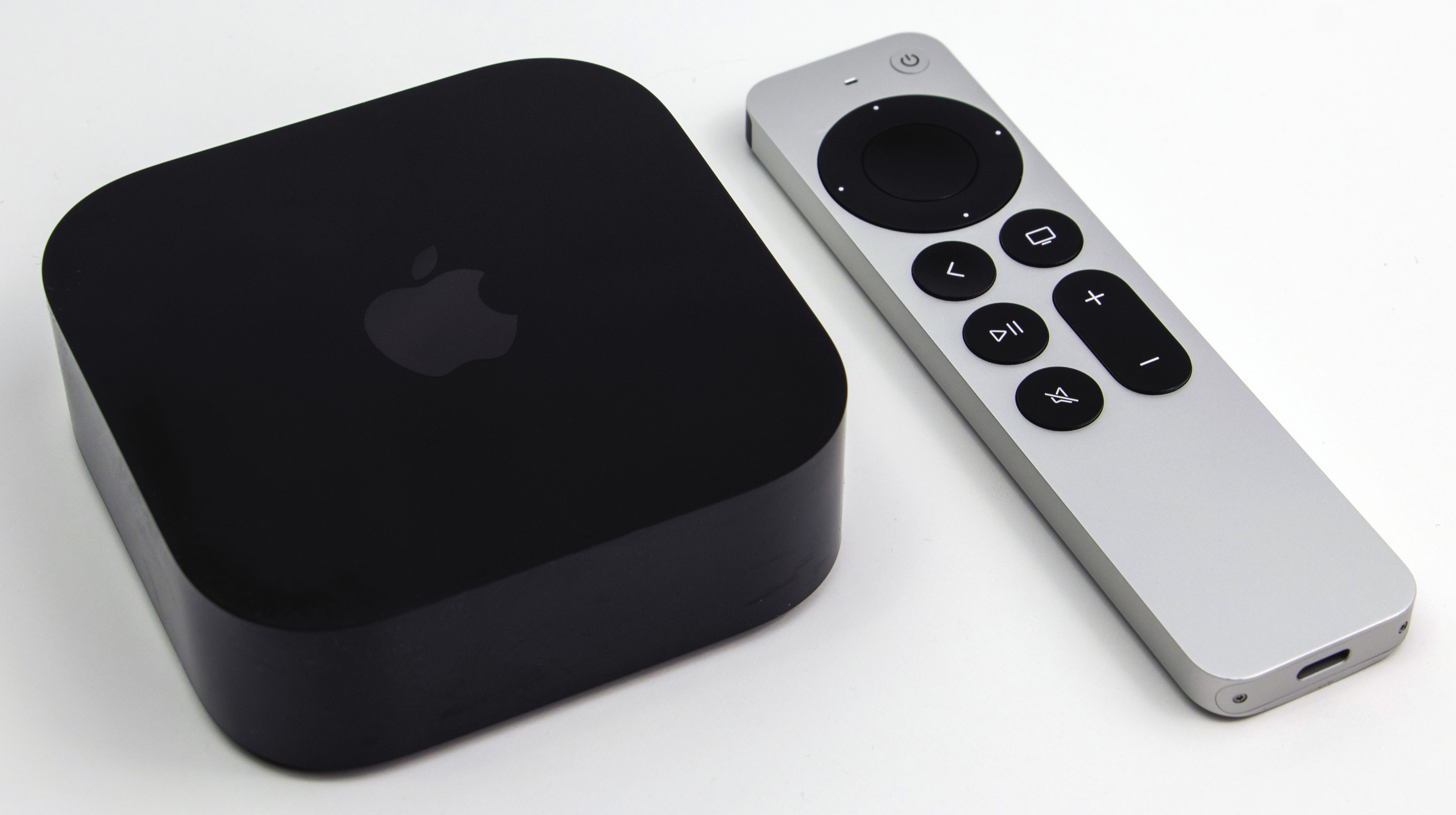
- Apple TV 4K with Siri Remote
- Developer: Apple
- Type: Digital media player Microconsole
- Released: 1st gen.: January 9, 2007; 2nd gen.: September 1, 2010; 3rd gen.: March 16, 2012; HD: October 30, 2015; 4K (1st gen.): September 12, 2017; 4K (2nd gen.): May 21, 2021; 4K (3rd gen.): November 4, 2022; 4K (4th gen.): November 13, 2026
- Website: apple.com/apple-tv-4k

Apple TV is a line of digital media players developed and manufactured by Apple Inc. Similarly to competing devices, they are capable of playing media content streamed from online services (including Apple TV, Apple Music, iTunes Store, and other third-party platforms), compatible devices over a local network (including protocols such as AirPlay), and stored on the device's internal storage. Since 2015, Apple TV devices run tvOS, an operating system derived from iOS that uses a 10-foot user interface optimized for televisions. They can also serve as a home hub for the Apple Home smart home platform.

The first generation Apple TV was introduced in 2007; it was primarily designed to download and play content from iTunes Store, synchronized from a Macintosh or PC, while a software update in 2008 added support for accessing content directly from Internet services such as iTunes Store and MobileMe, without the need for it to be synchronized from a computer. The second-generation Apple TV was released in 2010, which switched from Intel processors to Apple A-series chips, and introduced a new operating system derived from iOS. With the release of the fourth-generation model in 2015, the system software was renamed tvOS, and began to support third-party software via an app store, and integration with Siri.

== Background ==
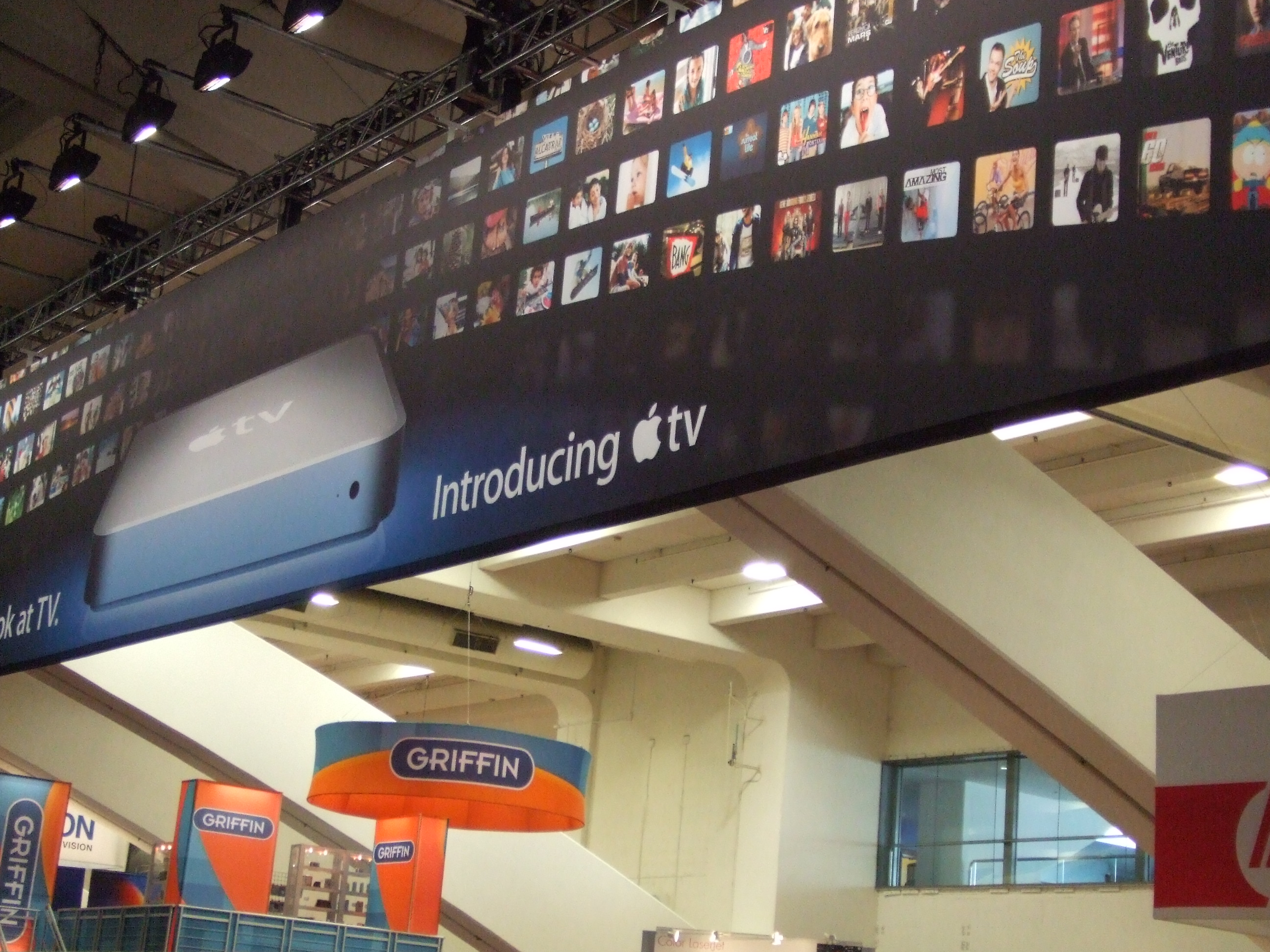
Macworld San Francisco banner "Introducing Apple TV", January 9, 2007

Prior to the launch of Apple TV, Apple had released several TV-based devices. In 1993, Apple released the Macintosh TV in an effort to enter the home entertainment industry. The device had a 14-inch CRT screen and a TV tuner card. It was not a commercial success, with only 10,000 sold before its discontinuation in 1994. That year, the company developed the Apple Interactive Television Box, a collaboration with BT Group and Proximus Group, that was never released to the public. Apple's final major attempt before the Apple TV was the Apple Pippin in 1995, which was a combination home game console and networked computer, which sold around 42,000 units.

== Models ==
=== First generation (2007) ===
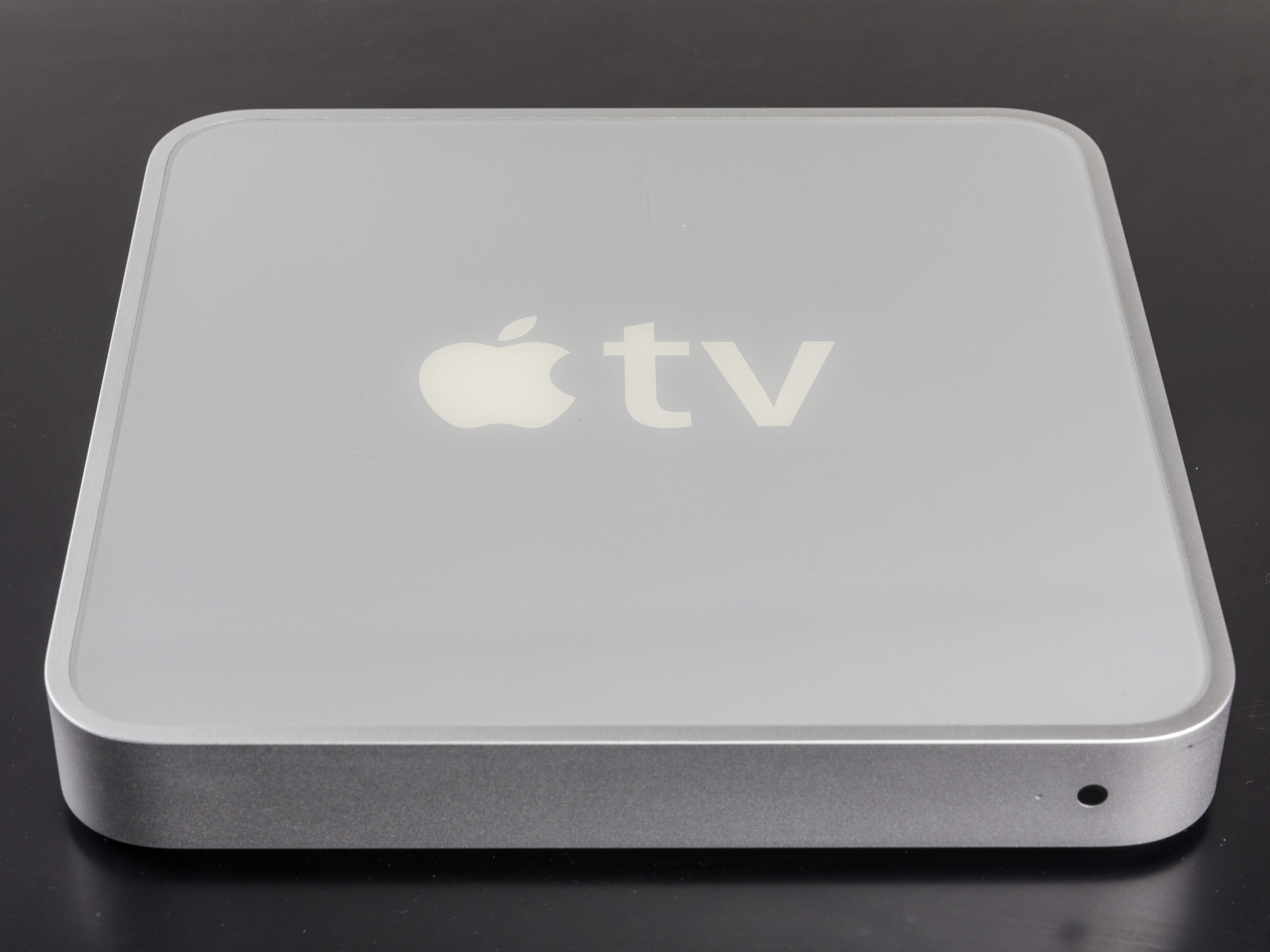

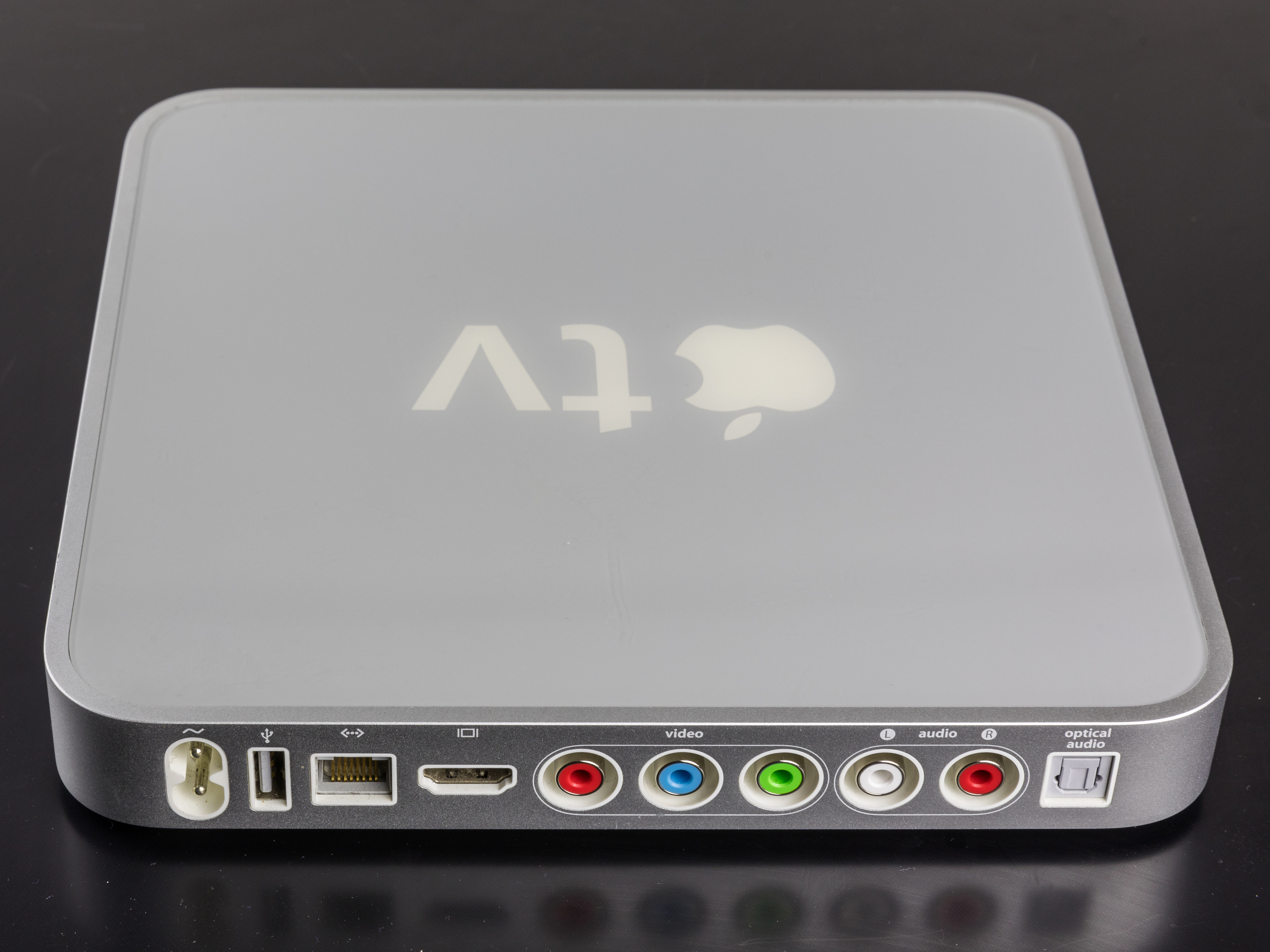
Form factor used by the Apple TV (first generation)

At a September 2006 special event, Apple announced the first generation Apple TV. Apple originally announced the device as iTV to fit into their "i"-based product naming convention, but later renamed it Apple TV due to a trademark dispute with British television network ITV. Preorders began in January 2007, and the device shipped that March.

The first generation Apple TV includes a Pentium M processor that runs a variant of Mac OS X Tiger, and originally shipped with a 40 GB hard drive. It supports output up to 720p via HDMI, and supported some standard definition televisions via component video. It also has a USB port and a 10/100 BASE-T Ethernet port. At launch, Apple TV required a Mac or Windows-based PC running iTunes on the same network to sync or stream content to it.

A model with a 160 GB hard drive was released in May 2007. The 40 GB version was discontinued in September 2009.

The first generation Apple TV could be modified into a makeshift Intel Mac Mini using a USB boot disk image available online; installation to the built-in hard drive was possible by flashing the image to the drive.

==== Software ====
Apple TV Software 1.0 had an interface similar to that of Front Row in Mac OS X. It had seven rows for Movies, TV Shows, Music, Podcasts, Photos, Settings, and Sources.

In February 2008, it became a stand-alone device through the "Take 2" version 2.0 software update, which removed the requirement of iTunes syncing from a separate computer, and allowed media from services such as iTunes Store, MobileMe, and Flickr to be accessed directly from Apple TV. In July 2008, Apple released the software 2.1 update, which added external recognition of iOS devices as remote control devices.

In October 2009, Apple released a minor upgrade called "Apple TV Software 3.0". This update included an updated interface with seven horizontal columns across the top of the screen for the different categories of content (Movies, TV Shows, Music, Podcasts, Photos, Internet, and Settings). This update also added features such as content filtering, iTunes Extras, new fonts, and a new Internet radio app. The Genius playlist option allowed for easier playlist creation.

=== Second generation (2010) ===
The user interface used in the second and third generation Apple TV series introduced a rounded rectangle tile interface.

Apple released the second generation Apple TV in September 2010. It includes an ARM-based Apple A4 chip and runs a variant of iOS. It is housed in a black plastic enclosure and is one-quarter the size of its predecessor. The device has 8 GB of flash storage for buffering, replacing the internal hard drive in the first generation model. It supports output up to 720p via HDMI and does not support standard definition televisions. Its software was updated to begin featuring streaming services, beginning with Netflix. In conjunction with its release, Apple renamed AirTunes to AirPlay, with support for streaming video from iOS devices and Macs to Apple TV.

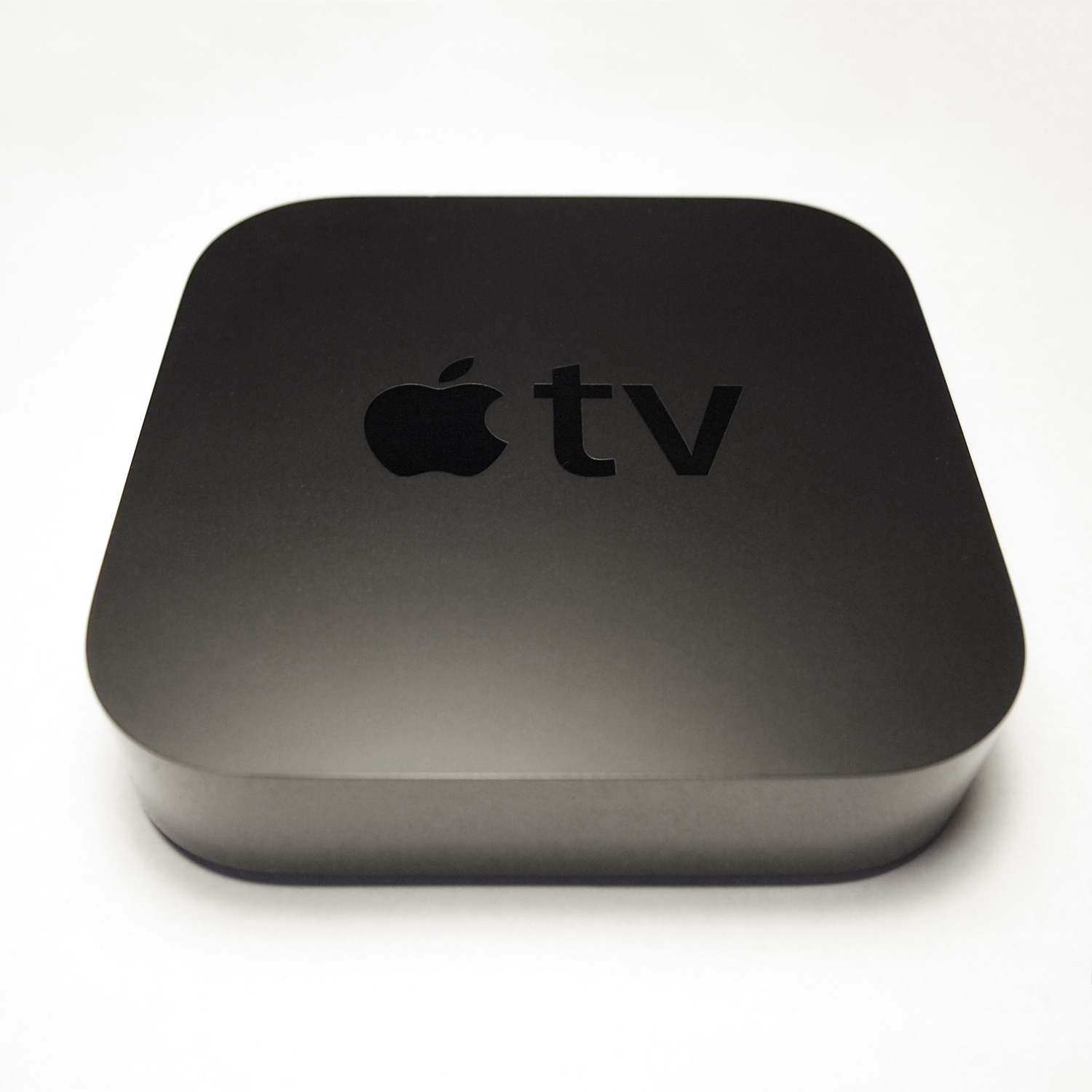

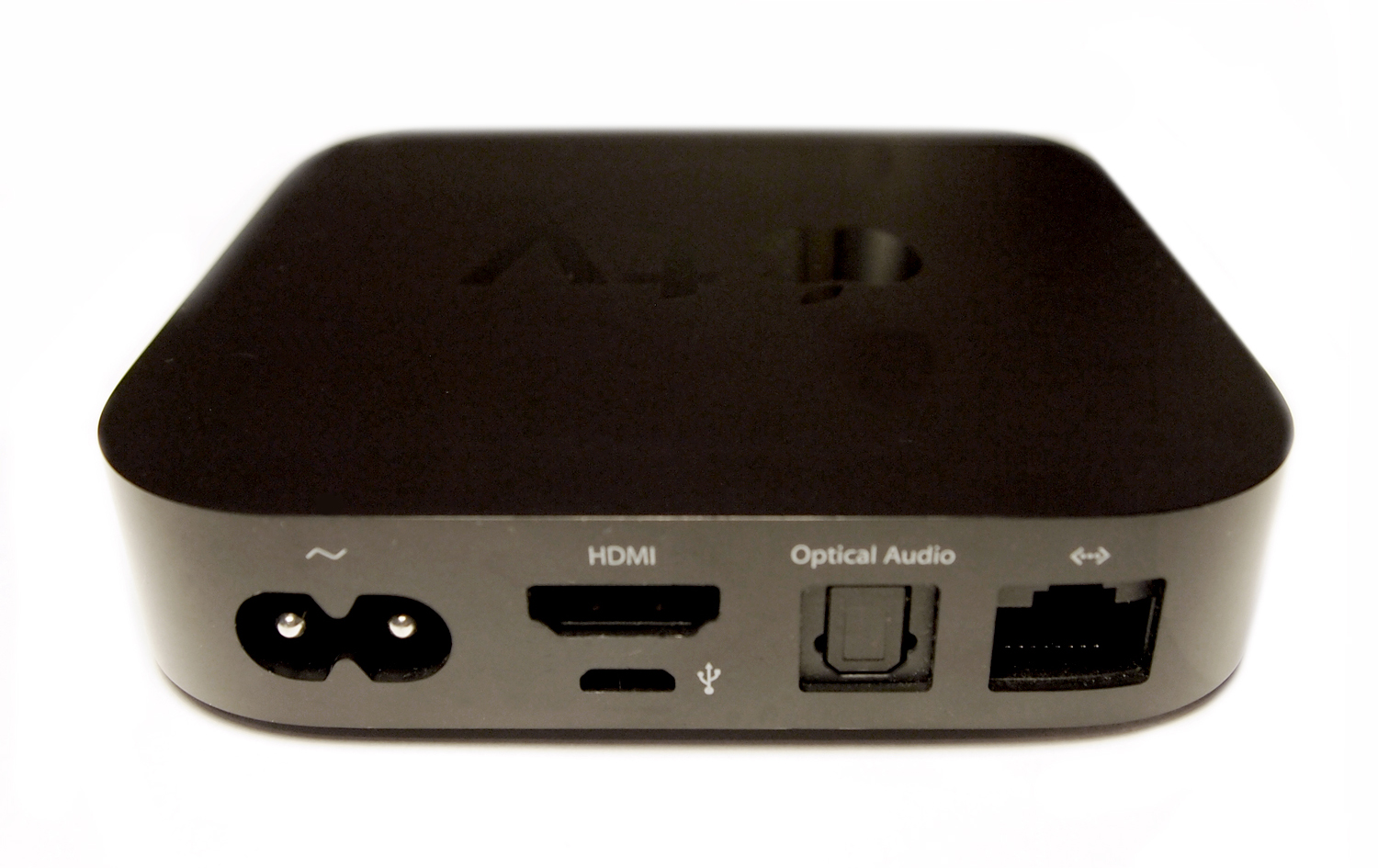
Form factor used by the second and third generation Apple TV

=== Third generation (2012) ===
At a March 2012 special event, Apple announced third generation Apple TV. Externally identical to its predecessor, it includes an A5 chip with one core deactivated and supports 1080p video output. It allowed remote access to HomeKit devices until functionality was removed with iOS 10.

Along with the release of the third generation model, Apple released Apple TV Software 5 (based on iOS 5.1), which revised the home screen to resemble the icon grid of iOS. The update was also released to the second generation model. The user interface design had reportedly been rejected by Apple's then-CEO Steve Jobs five years earlier.

Apple quietly released an updated "rev A1469" model in March 2013. It uses a single-core variant of the A5 chip and draws less power than the original model. Despite Apple's promise before the revision's launch that "the component changes ... don't affect product features", in September 2014, Apple TV Software 7.0 introduced peer-to-peer AirPlay exclusively for the rev A model. Software 7.0 also introduced a new flat design aesthetic similar to iOS 7 and OS X Yosemite.

The third generation model was discontinued in October 2016. In December 2017, Apple added support for Amazon Prime Video. The Apple TV app, bundled with Apple TV Software 7.3, was released in May 2019.

=== HD (originally fourth generation, 2015) ===
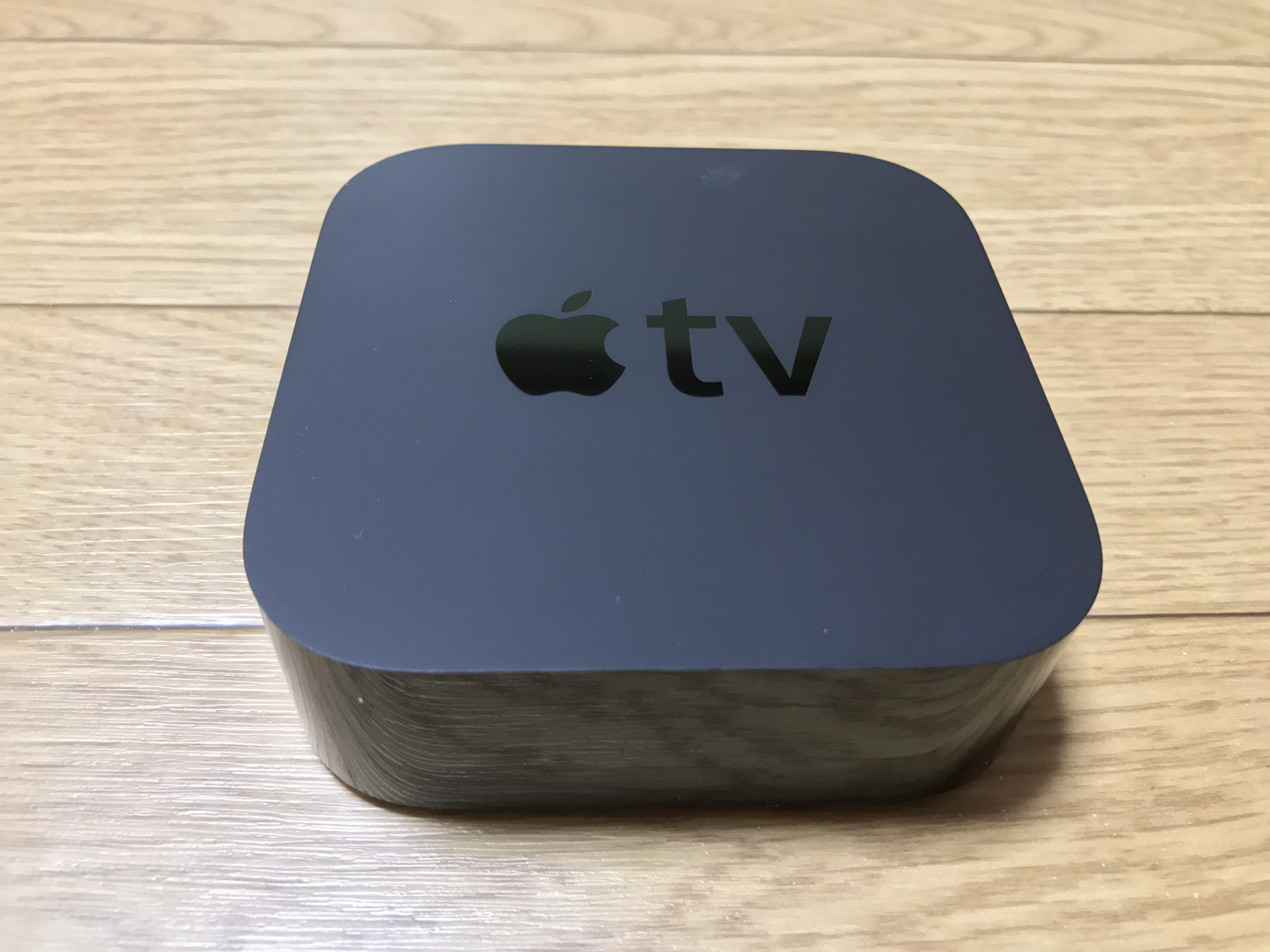

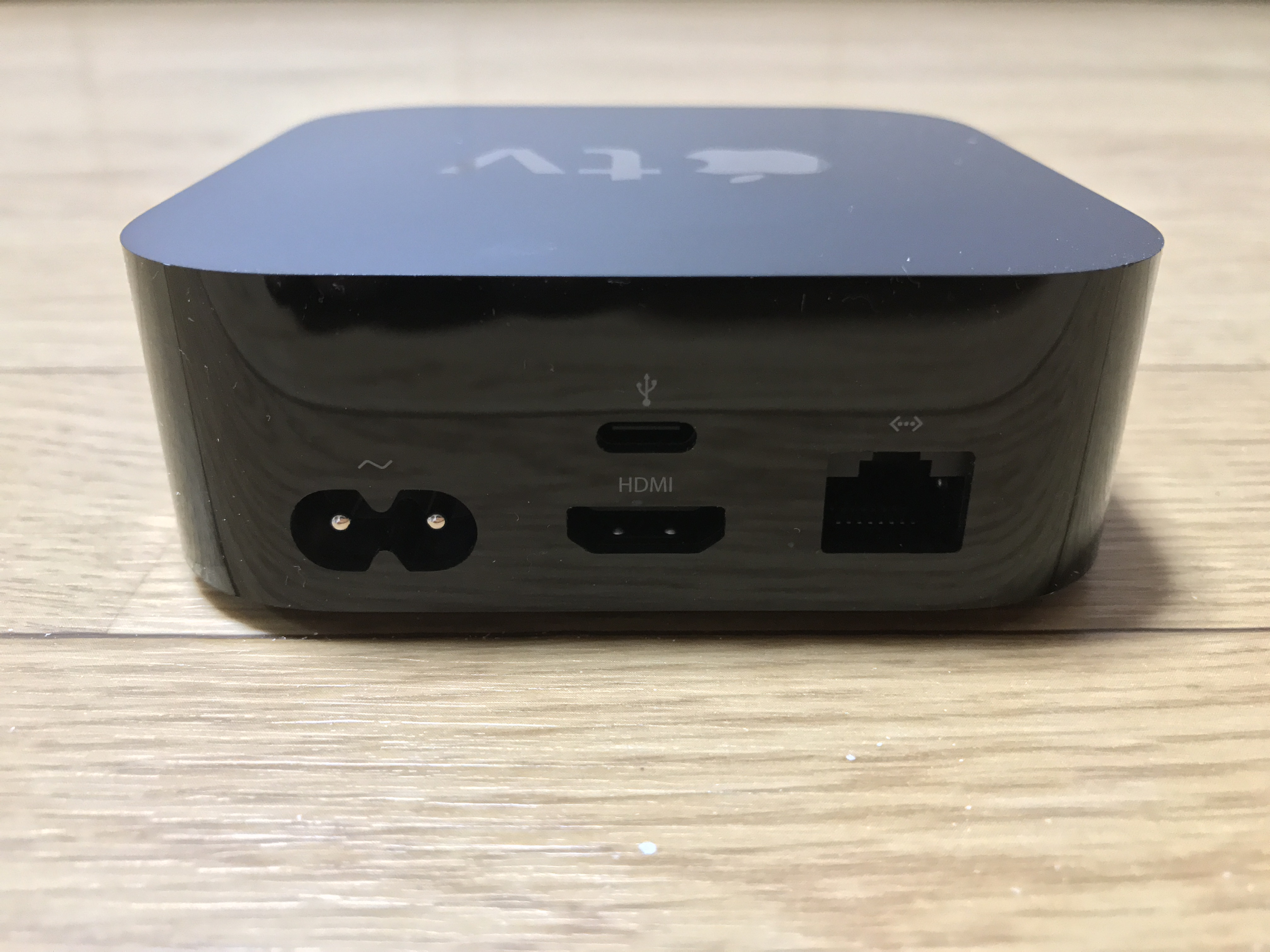
Form factor used by the Apple TV HD and 4K (first and second generation). Apple TV 4K models dropped the USB-C port.

On September 9, 2015, Apple announced the fourth generation Apple TV, and began shipping it in October 2015. It includes a 64-bit Apple A8 chip and adds Siri, support for Dolby Digital Plus audio, 802.11ac Wi-Fi, and support for audio output via Bluetooth. The HDMI 1.4 port supports HDMI CEC. The Apple TV system software was concurrently renamed tvOS, and added support for App Store to allow the development and distribution of third-party apps and games.

The model includes the Siri Remote, which replaced the arrow button on previous Apple TV remotes with a touchpad that uses swipe-to-select gestures. It has a dedicated Siri button, a built-in microphone, volume control over HDMI-CEC and IR, and an accelerometer (IMU). Apps and games on the tvOS App Store were initially required to be fully functional with the Siri Remote, but the requirement was later relaxed for games.

On September 13, 2016, Apple released tvOS 10 with support for single-sign on, a light-on-dark color scheme, and introduced HomeKit, which allows it to function as a home hub to control appliances remotely, grant guest access, and set up automations.

After the Apple TV 4K was released in 2017, Apple continued to sell the 32 GB model as an entry-level option, and rebranded it as the Apple TV HD in March 2019. On October 18, 2022, following the release of the third generation 4K model, the Apple TV HD was discontinued. The Apple TV HD is the longest supported Apple device ever, supporting eleven major versions of tvOS from versions 9 through 26.

=== 4K (first generation, 2017) ===
Updated logo for Apple TV 4K

On September 12, 2017, Apple announced the Apple TV 4K, with support for 2160p output, HDR10, Dolby Vision, Gigabit Ethernet, and a faster Apple A10X chip supporting HEVC hardware decoding. Support for Dolby Atmos with Dolby Digital Plus was added in tvOS 12. Changes to the enclosure include the addition of vents on the base, the removal of the USB-C port, and the addition of a tactile white ring around the Menu button on the included Siri Remote. The first generation Apple TV 4K was discontinued in 2021, following the announcement of the second generation model. In October 2026, Apple classified the first generation Apple TV 4K as "vintage," affecting its repair eligibility at Apple Stores and authorized service providers.

=== 4K (second generation, 2021) ===
On April 20, 2021, Apple announced the second generation Apple TV 4K with the A12 Bionic chip, support for high frame rate HDR, HDMI 2.1, Wi-Fi 6 and on-device Siri. Its HDMI port supports ARC and eARC, which allows other sources plugged into the television to output audio through Apple TV, including to AirPlay speakers like HomePod. Like the HomePod Mini, it has a Thread radio. It can pair with the ambient light sensor on iPhones with Face ID to optimize its color output, a feature that was also extended to older Apple TVs with tvOS 14.5. AirPlay supports high frame rate HDR playback, allowing videos shot on the iPhone 12 Pro in Dolby Vision 4K 60 FPS to be mirrored in full resolution. The A12 chip adds support for VP9 profile 2 decoding of 4K HDR10 video up to 60 FPS on YouTube. tvOS 17 added FaceTime and support for Continuity Camera with a paired iPhone or iPad.

The model also comes with a thicker, redesigned Siri Remote with a circular touchpad with navigational buttons, as well as power and mute buttons. The remote does not include an accelerometer and gyroscope, which were present in the previous Siri Remote, making it incompatible with some games. The remote is compatible with older tvOS-based Apple TVs and shipped with an updated SKU of the Apple TV HD.

=== 4K (third generation, 2022) ===
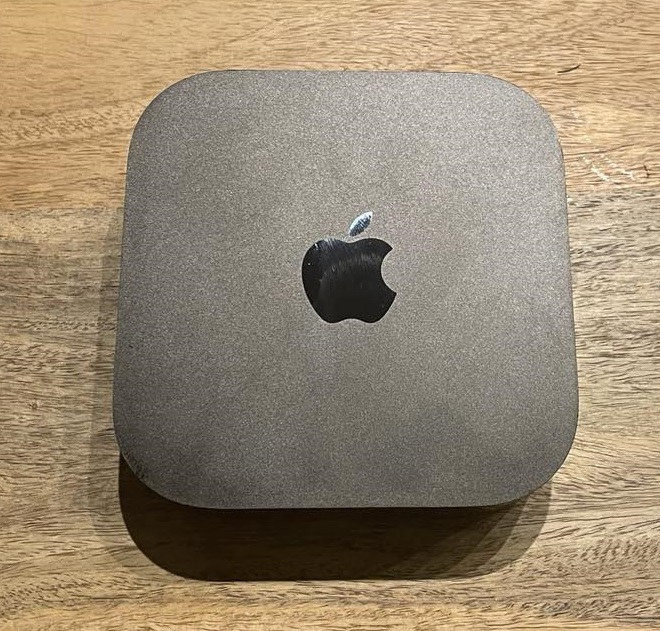
Top view of an Apple TV 4K (3rd generation)

On October 18, 2022, Apple announced an Apple TV 4K with the A15 Bionic chip with a 5-core CPU (one high efficiency core disabled) and 5-core GPU, support for HDR10+, Metal 4, reduced weight and dimensions (due to the removal of the fan), and without the "TV" text on the top of the unit, retaining the Apple logo. It supports HDMI 2.1 QMS that allows a change of refresh rate without a blank screen interruption. tvOS 18.2 added support for variable widescreen aspect ratios for projectors. It comes in two configurations, a Wi-Fi-only model with 64 GB of storage, and a more expensive 128 GB model that adds Ethernet and a Thread radio. The included Siri Remote charges via USB-C.

On June 25, 2026, the U.S. prices of the 64 GB and 128 GB models were increased to $199 and $249, respectively, a 54% and 67% increase of over the initial $129 and $149 prices, due to higher component prices caused by the global RAM and SSD shortage.

=== 4K (fourth generation, 2026) ===
On October 13, 2026, Apple announced the fourth-generation Apple TV 4K with an A19 chip. It has a 5-core CPU (one high efficiency core disabled) and 5-core GPU, like its predecessor. It also adds support for Wi-Fi 7, Bluetooth 6 and AV1 hardware decoding. It introduces support for Apple Intelligence and Siri AI, and includes three built-in far-field microphones that allow users to activate Siri without pressing a button on the remote. The white status light was moved to the center of the front of the device, otherwise it is externally identical to the previous model. It includes an updated Siri Remote that adds Find My support with precision finding that is supported by iPhones with Bluetooth 6 (iPhone 17 or newer, excluding iPhone 17e), and a built-in speaker that can play a sound to help locate the remote.

The fourth-generation model supports a four-speaker surround sound configuration using HomePod Mini 2 and HomePod (2nd generation) speakers, provided that the front and rear speaker pairs use matching models. It is offered in a single configuration without optional storage upgrades, priced in the US at $299, twice the launch price of the previous 128 GB model, and started shipping on November 13, 2026.The $299 launch price attracted criticism from consumers and technology commentators, with some long-time users questioning whether the hardware and feature improvements justified the substantial price increase.

== Features ==
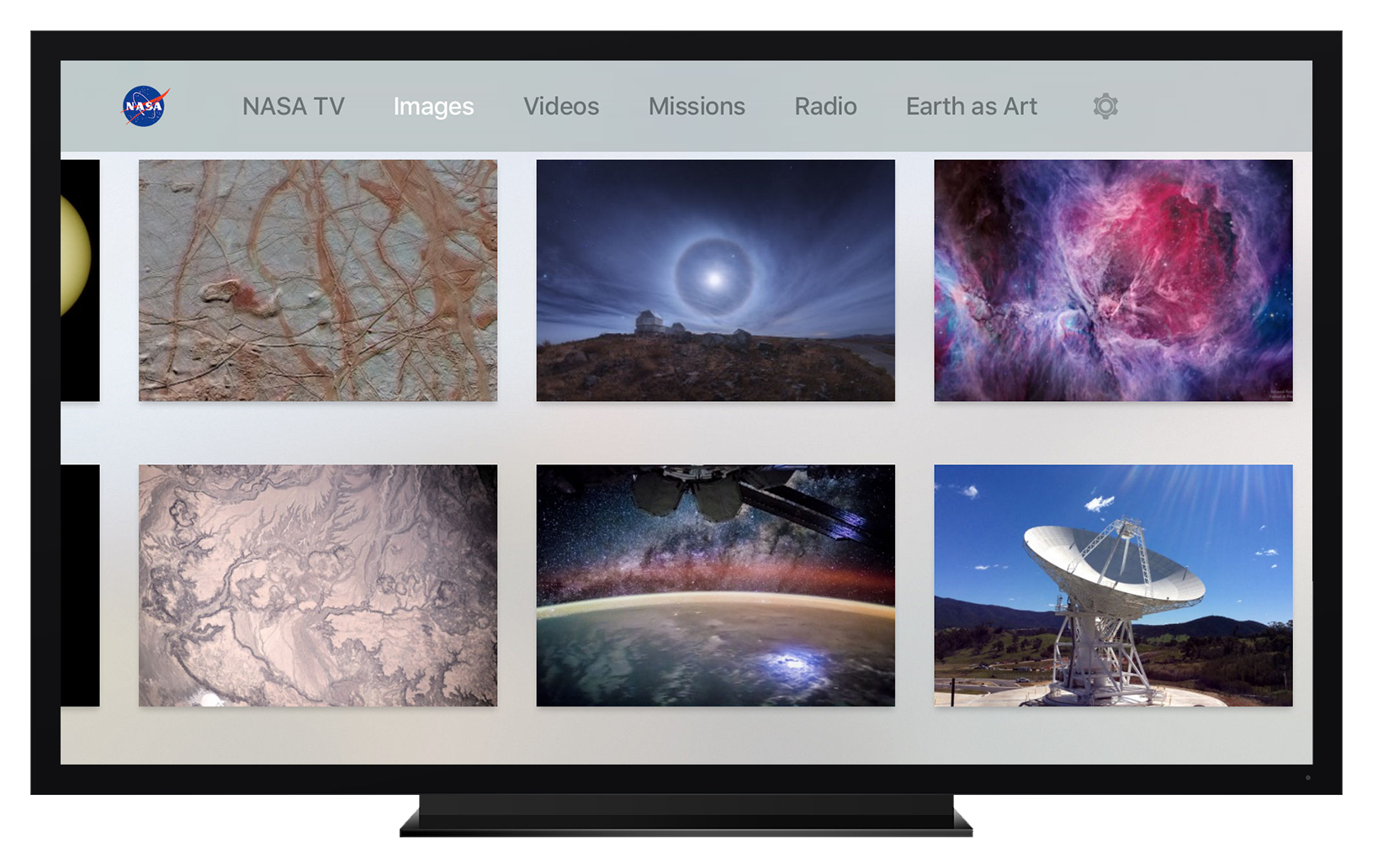
NASA app for Apple TV

=== Video streaming ===
- Apple TV can be used to rent and buy movies and TV shows from the iTunes Store. Since the fourth generation model, Apple TV can download apps and games from the tvOS App Store.
- Users can stream live and on-demand content from apps that support login through a cable provider by way of its TV app. The single-sign on feature in tvOS 10.1 and later allows users to log in to all of these apps at once, bypassing the need to authenticate each individually.
- Beginning with the fourth generation model, it can be linked with Wi-Fi-based TV tuners such as HDHomeRun.

=== Music and podcast streaming ===
- Since the second generation model, users can access their music and podcasts libraries that they purchased in iTunes through iCloud using the Music and Podcasts apps. Users can also subscribe to music streaming services and access content.

==== Photos ====
- Since the second generation model, the integrated Photos app can sync photos from iCloud Photo Library and display them on a television. Since the fourth generation model, users can download third-party apps to view, edit and share photos.

=== Casting and mirroring ===
- With AirPlay, introduced with the second generation model, users can stream or mirror content wirelessly from an iOS device or Mac. Its functions include:
  - Casting, which allows users to wirelessly send video or audio from their iPhone, iPad, or Mac to the Apple TV.
  - Mirroring, which allows users to wirelessly mirror their Mac screen or AirPlay device to the TV, using it as a second monitor.
  - Peer-to-peer AirPlay, introduced with the third generation "rev A" model, which uses Bluetooth to connect to an Apple TV if the iOS device or Mac are not on the same Wi-Fi network.

=== Siri ===
- Siri was introduced with the fourth generation model. It enables voice dictation in text fields, including usernames and passwords. Siri voice commands can control media playback, toggle closed captioning, and launch specific applications.
- The 4K (fourth generation) model supports on-device Siri AI functionality. The second and third generation 4K models will support Siri AI when paired with a supported iPhone or iPad.
- Universal search is available for apps in the United States. In Canada, France, Germany, and the United Kingdom, the feature is limited to iTunes and Netflix. In Australia, universal search supports movies and TV shows in iTunes, Netflix, and Stan.
- A Live Tune-In feature allows the viewer to ask Siri to tune to live streams.

=== Apple Home ===
- Apple Home functionality was initially introduced with the third generation model, but was phased out with iOS 10. Since iOS 10, the fourth generation model can be used as a home hub to control Apple Home appliances remotely, grant guest access, and set up automations.

=== General ===
- HDMI CEC, which was introduced with the fourth generation model, can control other devices in a home theater.
- App Switcher enables users to switch apps.
- Aerial Screensaver allows the TV to display a flyover view of a city when Apple TV is inactive. Screensavers can also be invoked from the home screen by pressing menu on the Siri Remote once.

=== App Store ===
- Since the fourth generation model, the tvOS App Store allows developers to create apps for Apple TV. It supports various third-party utilities and entertainment services.
- Apps can be easily ported from iOS to tvOS because the operating systems share a common codebase and kernel.

=== Accessibility ===
tvOS inherits many of the accessibility features of iOS and macOS and is compatible with Apple's entire product line including the Apple Watch as a remote. tvOS includes VoiceOver, Zoom, and Siri as tools to assist users with low vision. When a wireless keyboard is paired, VoiceOver provides audio feedback by speaking each character as it is typed. Apple TV is compatible with the Apple Wireless Keyboard and the Apple Magic Keyboard.

Apple TV supports closed captioning. Compatible episodes and movies are denoted with a CC (closed captioning) or SDH (Descriptive Audio) icon in the iTunes Store either on the Apple TV or in iTunes. The viewer can customize the styles and fonts of captions according to their preferences and needs. Apple's Remote app on iOS devices allows control of the Apple TV from an iPhone, iPad or iPod Touch.

=== Restrictions ===
Apple restricts access to most viewed charts on movies and podcasts. They are replaced by "Top Movies", "Top Podcasts", and "Editor's Picks". Parental controls can limit access to content via "Restrictions" settings; individual services can be turned off. Internet media is split into four categories: "Internet Photos", "YouTube", "Podcasts", and "Purchase and Rental". Each of the categories is configured by a parental control of "Show", "Hide" or "Ask" to prompt for a 4-digit PIN. In addition, media can be restricted by rating.

=== Local sources ===
Apple TV allows users on a computer running iTunes to sync or stream photos, music and videos. A computer on a local network can be connected to maintain a central library, provide direct connectivity to photo organization software such as iPhoto, limit home video access to a local network only, play Internet radio, or preload content to be used later as a offline video player. Synchronization and streaming modes are supported when Apple TV is connected to a computer. The Movies search box searches only the iTunes Store, not local hard drives and networks.

Apple TV in synchronization mode functions in a way similar to the iPod. It is paired with an iTunes library on a single computer and can synchronize with that library, copying all or selected content to its internal storage. Apple TV does not need to remain connected to the network after syncing.

Apple TV can function as a peer-to-peer digital media player, streaming content from iTunes libraries and playing the content over the network.

Apple TV can stream content from more than one iTunes library: iTunes libraries can be on the same or on different computers; the Apple TV and iTunes library must be on the same local network and have the Home Sharing feature enabled using the identical Apple ID. It can stream content locally using third-party apps such as Plex, Kodi, VLC media player, Emby and MrMC.

==== Supported formats ====
Apple TV natively supports many audio, video, and picture formats (although with the Apple TV HD and later, apps may use alternative built-in software in order to play other codecs and formats, e.g. Emby, MrMC, VLC media player, Kodi and Plex):

Supported Formats
Codec		1st gen.	2nd gen.	3rd gen.	HD	4K (1st gen.)	4K (2nd gen.)	4K (3rd gen.)	4K (4th gen.)
Video/image	HEVC H.265	Not supported			1080p SDR Main/Main 10 up to 30 FPS via software decoding	2160p SDR Main/Main 10 up to 60 FPS, Dolby Vision (Profile 5)/HDR10 (Main 10 profile) up to 30 FPS	2160p SDR/Dolby Vision (Profile 5)/HDR10 (Main 10 profile) up to 60 FPS		2160p SDR/Dolby Vision (Profile 5 and 8.1)/HDR10 (Main 10 profile) up to 60 FPS
Video/image	HEVC H.265	Not supported			1080p SDR Main/Main 10 up to 30 FPS via software decoding	2160p SDR Main/Main 10 up to 60 FPS, Dolby Vision (Profile 5)/HDR10 (Main 10 profile) up to 30 FPS	-	HDR10+ support	
Video/image	HEVC H.265	Not supported			.m4v, .mp4, and .mov containers				
Video/image	AVC H.264	720p at 24 FPS, 960 by 540 at 30 FPS	720p at 30 FPS	1080p at 30 FPS	1080p at 60 FPS	2160p at 60 FPS			
Video/image	AVC H.264	.m4v, .mp4, and .mov containers							
Video/image	AV1	Not supported				1080p SDR via software decoding	2160p SDR via software decoding		2160p SDR/Dolby Vision (Profile 5 and 8.1)/HDR10+ (Main 10 profile) up to 60 FPS
Video/image	VP9	Not supported				Profile 1 decoding, 2160p SDR up to 30 FPS or 1440p up to 60 FPS	Profile 2 decoding, 2160p HDR10 up to 60 FPS		
Video/image	MPEG-4	640x480 at 30 FPS							
Video/image	MPEG-4	.m4v, .mp4, and .mov containers							
Video/image	Motion JPEG	Not supported	720p at 30 FPS (.avi)						
Video/image	JPEG	Supported							
Video/image	GIF	Supported							
Video/image	TIFF	Supported							
Video/image	HEIF	Not supported			Supported				
Audio	HE-AAC (V1)	Not supported	Up to 2 channels, 16 to 320 kbit/s						
Audio	AAC, protected AAC	Up to 2 channels, up 160 kbit/s AAC-LC in video containers or 320 kbit/s for audio only							
Audio	MP3	Up to 2 channels, 16 to 320 kbit/s							
Audio	Apple Lossless	Up to 2 channels							
Audio	Apple Lossless	24-bit/44.1 kHz	24-bit/48 kHz					24-bit/192 kHz	
Audio	FLAC	Not supported			Up to 2 channels				
Audio	AIFF	Up to 2 channels							
Audio	WAV	Up to 2 channels							
Audio	Dolby Digital (AC-3)	Up to 5.1 channels							
Audio	Dolby Digital Plus (E-AC-3)	Not supported			Up to 7.1 channels	Up to 7.1.4 channels with Dolby Atmos metadata			

Apple offers AVC 1080p video content encoded at rates from 4 to 8 Mbit/s and HEVC 4K video encoded at rates up to 30 Mbit/s through iTunes and the TV app. Films on Blu-ray are 1080p H.264 or VC-1 video encoded at rates of up to 40 Mbit/s, while films on Ultra HD Blu-ray are 2160p HEVC video encoded up to 128 Mbit/s.

Since the fourth generation model, Apple TV's audio chip supports 7.1 surround sound, and some high definition rentals from iTunes are offered with Dolby Digital 5.1 surround sound. The Apple TV 4K introduced 7.1.4 channel decoding with Dolby Atmos metadata.

=== Remote control ===
Apple TV can be paired with an Apple Remote. The Apple Wireless Keyboard is supported. Third-party keyboards that use the Apple layout may be compatible. The Apple Watch has a remote app.

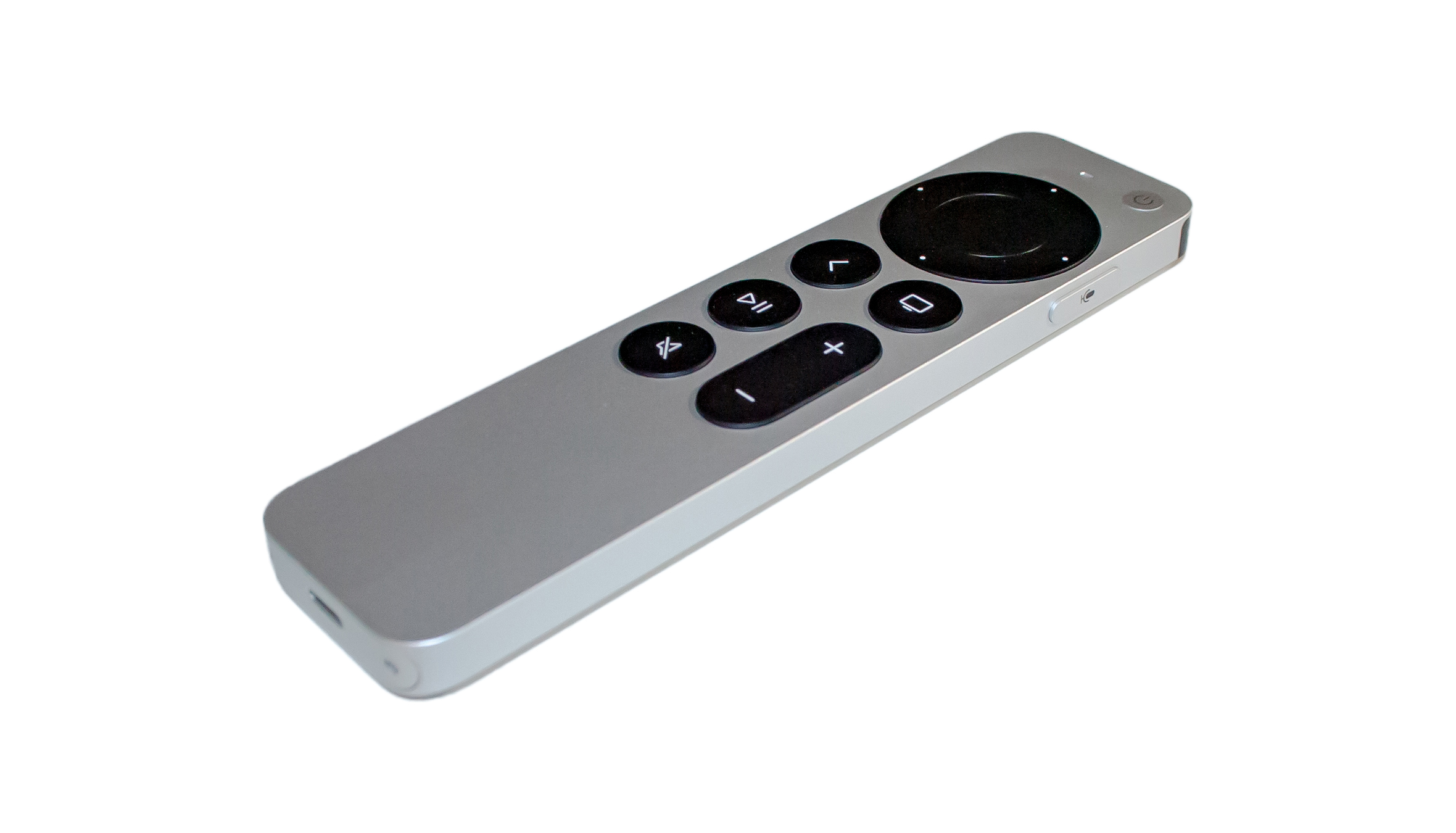
The second generation Apple Siri Remote is included with the second generation 4K Apple TV and later, as well as being sold by itself.

Since the fourth generation model, the Siri Remote has been bundled with Apple TV. Siri is available only in jurisdictions that allow Siri. It includes dual microphones for Siri support and a glass touch surface for navigation around the interface by swiping or tapping and scrubbing to fast forward or rewind. It has a menu and home button, a Siri button, a Play/Pause button, and a Volume Up/Down button.

The Siri Remote communicates with the Apple TV via Bluetooth and does not require line-of-sight communications.

== End of life ==
=== First generation ===
The first generation Apple TV lost access to YouTube in May 2015.

In September 2018, Apple discontinued iTunes Store support for the first generation Apple TV, with accessibility being obstructed due to obsolete security standards.

=== Second and third generation ===
iOS 10, released in 2016, removed the ability to use the third generation Apple TV as a hub to control Apple Home automations. It retained support as a hub for remote access to devices.

With the release of iOS 16 in 2022, Apple Home received a major redesign based on a new architecture which the third generation Apple TV did not support, and remote access no longer functioned in homes upgraded to it. Support for the legacy Apple Home architecture was removed in iOS 26, released in 2025.

iOS 16 removed support for most AirPlay functionality with the second and third generation Apple TV, including playback of DRM content.

YouTube was removed from the second generation model in May 2015 and the third generation model in March 2021. HBO dropped support for its apps on both models in 2020. Hulu dropped both models in October 2022, and Netflix dropped both models in June 2024.

=== HD and 4K (1st generation) ===
tvOS 27 drops support for the Apple TV HD and Apple TV 4K (1st generation) due to hardware limitations. Neither model supports the Liquid Glass design language that was introduced in tvOS 26.

== Technical specifications ==
Legend	Unsupported	Discontinued	Current	Upcoming

Models		1st gen.	2nd gen.	3rd gen.	HD	4K (1st gen.)	4K (2nd gen.)	4K (3rd gen.)	4K (4th gen.)
Release		January 9, 2007; May 30, 2007 (160 GB)	September 1, 2010	March 7, 2012	October 30, 2015	September 22, 2017	May 21, 2021	November 4, 2022	November 13, 2026
Discontinued		September 14, 2009 (40 GB); September 1, 2010 (160 GB)	March 7, 2012	September 8, 2016	September 12, 2017 (64 GB); October 18, 2022 (32 GB)	April 20, 2021	October 18, 2022	October 13, 2026	In production
Model number		A1218	A1378	A1427	A1625	A1842	A2169	A2737 (64 GB); A2843 (128 GB)	A3593
Model ID		AppleTV1,1	AppleTV2,1	AppleTV3,1; AppleTV3,2	AppleTV5,3	AppleTV6,2	AppleTV11,1	AppleTV14,1	AppleTV18,1
Order number		MA711	MC572	MD199	MGY52 (32 GB); MLNC2 (64 GB)	MQD22 (32 GB); MP7P2 (64 GB)	MXGY2 (32 GB); MXH02 (64 GB)	MN873 (64 GB); MN893 (128 GB)	MLFF4
Introductory price		US$299	US$99		US$149 (32 GB); US$199 (64 GB)		US$179 (32 GB); US$199 (64 GB)	US$129 (64 GB); US$149 (128 GB) (Note: Prices raised to $199 and $249 on June 25, 2026, due to the global memory supply shortage.)	US$299
Processor		Intel "Crofton" Pentium M	Apple A4	Apple A5	Apple A8	Apple A10X Fusion	Apple A12 Bionic	Apple A15 Bionic	Apple A19
Graphics		Nvidia GeForce Go 7300 with 64 MB VRAM	Apple A4	Apple A5	Apple A8	Apple A10X Fusion	Apple A12 Bionic	Apple A15 Bionic	Apple A19
Neural Engine		—N/a					8-core	16-core	
Memory		256 MB (DDR2)	256 MB (LPDDR2)	512 MB (LPDDR2)	2 GB (LPDDR3)	3 GB (LPDDR4)		4 GB (LPDDR4)	8 GB (LPDDR5X)
Storage		40 or 160 GB HDD	8 GB NAND flash for cache		32 or 64 GB NAND flash			64 or 128 GB NAND flash	128 GB NAND flash
Peripheral connections	Output	HDMI (unspecified revision)			HDMI 1.4	HDMI 2.0a	HDMI 2.1 with eARC	HDMI 2.1 with eARC and QMS	
Peripheral connections	Output	Component video	—N/a						
Peripheral connections	Output	Optical audio			—N/a				
Peripheral connections	Service port	USB 2.0	Micro-USB		USB-C	Lightning adapter	—N/a		
Connectivity		802.11b/g/draft-n Wi-Fi	802.11a/b/g/n Wi-Fi		802.11ac Wi-Fi with MIMO		Wi-Fi 6 (802.11ax)		Wi-Fi 7 (802.11be)
Connectivity		—N/a					Thread	Thread (128 GB model only)	Thread
Connectivity		10/100BASE-T Ethernet				Gigabit Ethernet		Gigabit Ethernet (128 GB model only)	Gigabit Ethernet
Connectivity		—N/a	Bluetooth 2.0 + EDR (support for keyboards only)	Bluetooth 4.0 (support for keyboards only)	Bluetooth 4.0	Bluetooth 5.0			Bluetooth 6
Connectivity		Infrared receiver							
Video output		1080p (undefined, following the Version 3.0 software update), 720p 60/50 Hz (NTSC/PAL), 576p 50 Hz (PAL), 480p 60 Hz (NTSC) over HDMI (HDCP capable) or Component Video (480i 60 Hz is unofficially supported)	720p, 576p, 480p over HDMI only (HDCP capable)	1080p, 720p, 576p, 480p over HDMI only (HDCP capable)		2160p, 1080p, 720p, 576p, 480p over HDMI only (HDCP capable)			
Video output		SDR				SDR, HDR10, Dolby Vision		SDR, HDR10+, Dolby Vision	
Audio output		Optical audio (48 kHz maximum sample rate), HDMI, RCA analog stereo audio	Optical audio (48 kHz fixed sample rate), HDMI		HDMI-CEC, AirPlay, Bluetooth				
Audio output		5.1 channels			7.1 channels	7.1.4 channels (Dolby Atmos)			
Power		48 W	6 W		11 W	13 W		5.2 W	TBD
Cooling		Active	Passive			Active		Passive	
Dimensions (H × W × D)		28 × 197 × 197 mm (1.1 × 7.8 × 7.8 in)	23 × 98 × 98 mm (0.91 × 3.86 × 3.86 in)		35 × 98 × 98 mm (1.4 × 3.9 × 3.9 in)			31 × 93 × 93 mm (1.2 × 3.7 × 3.7 in)	
Weight		1.09 kg (2.4 lb)	0.27 kg (0.60 lb)		425 g (15.0 oz)			208 g (7.3 oz) 64 GB; 214 g (7.5 oz) 128 GB	217 g (7.7 oz)
Included remote		Apple Remote (plastic)	Apple Remote (aluminum)		Siri Remote (first gen. until 2021, second gen. after 2021)	Siri Remote (first gen.)	Siri Remote (second gen.)	Siri Remote (third gen.)	Siri Remote (fourth gen.)
OS	Initial	Apple TV Software 1.0	Apple TV Software 4.0	Apple TV Software 5.0	tvOS 9.0	tvOS 11.0	tvOS 14.5	tvOS 16.0	tvOS 27.0
OS	Latest	Apple TV Software 3.0.2	Apple TV Software 6.2.1	Apple TV Software 7.9	tvOS 26.6.1		tvOS 27.2.1		

Timeline of iOS devices: iPhone, iPod Touch, iPad, Apple TV, and Apple Watch models
Sources: Apple Inc. Newsroom Archive, Mactracker Apple Inc. model database
See also: List of Apple products, iOS version history, iPod § Timeline of models, and List of iPhone models § Timeline

== Sales ==
Within the first week of presales in January 2007, Apple TV was the top pre-selling item at the Apple Store. Orders exceeded 100,000 units by the end of the month. Sales surpassed a million units before the 2007 holiday season. Analysts began calling it a "DVD killer" that could enable multiple services. Best Buy was one of the first retailers to carry the device; Target and Costco quickly followed.

Amazon notably declined to develop an Amazon Video app for the Apple TV until 2017. In October 2015, shortly before the launch of the fourth generation model, Amazon announced would no longer sell the Apple TV, citing "customer confusion" and removed the third generation model from its marketplace. Amazon reversed their stance and released an Amazon Video app in late 2017, and resumed sales of the Apple TV.

The second generation sold 250,000 units in its first two weeks. On December 21, 2010, Apple announced it had sold 1 million units. Apple sold 2.8 million units in fiscal year 2011.

A market survey published by Parks Associates in December 2014 found that Apple TV has lost consumer traction to Google Chromecast, garnering only a 17% market share.

Sales
Year	Units
2011	2.8 million
2012	2.7 million
2015	25 million (cumulative)
2019	53 million (cumulative estimate)

== See also ==
- Comparison of digital media players
- Mac Mini, which originally featured the Front Row application, a ten-foot user interface similar to that of the Apple TV
