= Front Row (software) =

Discontinued Apple media center application

- Front Row v2 (Included with Snow Leopard)
- Developer: Apple Inc.
- Final release: 2.2.1 (314) / November 9, 2009; 17 years ago
- Operating system: Mac OS X
- Type: Media Center
- License: Proprietary
- Website: www.apple.com/macosx/what-is-macosx/apps-and-utilities.html#frontrow

Front Row is a discontinued media center application by Apple for Macintosh computers and Apple TV for navigating and viewing video, photos, podcasts and music from a computer, optical disc or the Internet through a 10-foot user interface (similar to Kodi and Windows Media Center). The software relies on iTunes and iPhoto and is controlled by an Apple Remote or the keyboard function keys. The first version was released in October 2005 for Mac OS X 10.4, with two major revisions since. Front Row was removed and discontinued in Mac OS X 10.7.

== Versions ==
=== Introduction ===
Front Row was first unveiled on October 12, 2005 with the new iMac G5 (along with the built-in iSight camera, the Apple Remote, and Photo Booth). The software was billed as an alternative interface for playing and running iPhoto, DVD Player, and iTunes (Internet radio stations could play by adding the station into a playlist in iTunes).

In 2006, Front Row was added to the first Intel Mac Mini, which also gained a built-in infrared sensor and Apple Remote. The model's media center features were reviewed positively by PC World. This new version of Front Row could stream media from other computers on the local network.

Front Row v1.3.1 running on Tiger

=== Apple TV ===
The next incarnation, released in the original Apple TV software in March 2007, was a complete, stand alone application that played content directly from libraries. Among the features added were more prominent podcasts and TV show menus, trailer streaming, a settings menu, streaming content from computers on the local network, and album and video art for local media. In the summer of 2007, Apple released an update adding streaming of YouTube videos.

=== Version two ===
Released in November 2007 with Mac OS X v10.5 (Leopard), version two of Front Row included the new features introduced with the Apple TV (except for the YouTube viewer), a different opening transition, ending AirTunes functionality, and a launcher application in addition to the Command+Escape keyboard shortcut.

Front Row 2 has an undocumented plug-in architecture, for which various third-party plugins are now available, based on reverse-engineering the Front Row environment. Because it uses QuickTime to render video, Front Row can utilize any codec installed in QuickTime, including DivX, Xvid and WMV, and play DVD images copied to the hard disk. However, because Front Row does not use QuickTime X, it lacks support for certain codec features like Sample Aspect Ratio.

=== "Take 2" ===
In January 2008, Apple announced an update branded "Apple TV Take Two" for Apple TV Software. In addition to the prominent addition of direct downloads for movies, TV episodes, and podcasts via the iTunes Store, movie rentals, the ability to view online photos from Flickr or iCloud (branded .Mac at the time), and the ability to stream audio to AirTunes were added. This update did away with Front Row and introduced a new interface for the original Apple TV in which content was organized into six categories, all of which appeared in a large square box on the screen upon startup (movies, TV shows, music, YouTube, podcasts and photos) and presented in the initial menu, along with a "Settings" option for configuration, including software updates.

=== Discontinuation ===
Front Row was discontinued with the July 2011 release of Mac OS X Lion (v 10.7). The software appeared in neither the early Developer Previews nor the final version.

While it was initially possible to reinstall Front Row by copying the frameworks and application into OS X Lion, iTunes v 10.4 on 22 July 2011 broke compatibility, causing those who updated iTunes to lose access to their music through Front Row.
