= Remote (platform) =

American human resources technology platform

- Company type: Private
- Industry: Human resources technology
- Founded: 2019; 7 years ago
- Founders: Job van der Voort; Marcelo Lebre
- Headquarters: San Francisco, California (Remote-First)
- Services: Payroll; Compliance; Employer of Record (EOR); HRIS; Remote Job Marketplace

Remote is a human resources technology platform which provides payroll and compliance services for companies with distributed workforces and contractors. The company has no physical offices and operates fully remotely.

== History ==
Remote was founded in 2019 by Job van der Voort and Marcelo Lebre. Van der Voort was previously the vice president of product at GitLab and Lebre was the vice president of engineering for Unbabel. Remote's investors include Sequoia Capital, Index Ventures, Accel, Two Sigma Ventures, and General Catalyst.

In April 2020, Remote secured $11 million in its seed funding round. By November 2020, the company raised $35 million in its Series A round. In July 2021, Remote closed Series B funding with $150 million and achieved unicorn status with a valuation of over $1 billion. In April 2022, the company further expanded its funding with a $300 million Series C round.

At this time, Remote had a $3 billion valuation with $495 million raised. Reuters attributed the growth to the increasing adoption of remote work due to the coronavirus pandemic.

In July 2022, Remote cut about 10% of its workforce due to economic uncertainties. In September 2022, Job van der Voort, co-founder and CEO of Remote, was honored with the LOEY Award. In June 2023, the company entered a revenue-sharing arrangement with HR tech company Gusto. On September 21, 2023, Marcelo Lebre, co-founder of Remote, received the inaugural Prémio Ecossistema from Startup Lisboa and Unicorn Factory Lisboa, recognizing his significant contributions to Portugal's entrepreneurial ecosystem.

In April 2024, Remote acquired Easop, a company that helps businesses manage stock and equity compensation for employees in over 70 countries. In May, Job van der Voort, co-founder and CEO of Remote, was recognized as one of the wealthiest young Dutch entrepreneurs. His estimated net worth surged to €675 million, marking a nearly 17-fold increase from the previous year.

On November 19, 2024, Remote and Kota have teamed up to streamline global employee benefits management. The collaboration introduces Remote Global Benefits, enabling companies to manage multi-country health insurance and comply with local regulations seamlessly.

== Products ==
Since its founding in 2019, Remote has operated as an Employer of Record (EOR), hiring employees worldwide for companies that lack legal entities in those countries. The company's EOR services are offered through a platform that helps businesses hire remote workers and manage onboarding, taxes, payments, compliance, and benefits.

In September 2023, Remote introduced its Global HR Platform designed for employers with workers in multiple countries, which includes the Remote HRIS. The services included are talent management, time and attendance tracking, and integrated payroll. In October 2023, the company launched a remote job marketplace called Remote Talent.

In February 2024, Remote launched Contractor Management Plus, a tool designed to help employers avoid contractor misclassification by automating onboarding, record keeping, and localized contract generation in over 200 countries. On January 29, 2025, Remote launched a Contractor of Record service to help companies manage international contractors by handling legal responsibilities such as onboarding, invoicing, tax management, and payments, reducing compliance risks.
