= Apple Podcasts =

Podcast app developed by Apple

- Screenshot of the Podcasts app in iOS 27
- Developer: Apple
- Release: iOS: June 26, 2012; 14 years ago tvOS: January 26, 2016; 10 years ago watchOS: September 17, 2018; 8 years ago HomePod: February 9, 2018; 8 years ago macOS: October 7, 2019; 7 years ago Amazon Echo: December 13, 2019; 6 years ago Web app: August 19, 2024; 2 years ago
- Stable release: iOS 15.1 / October 25, 2021; 5 years ago
- Operating system: iOS 10 and later iPadOS 10 and later watchOS 5.1 and later tvOS 9.1.1 and later macOS Catalina and later Windows (as part of iTunes); Web app and visionOS 1 and later
- Predecessor: iTunes (macOS)
- License: Freeware
- Website: Home Page: apple.com/apple-podcasts; Web Player: podcasts.apple.com

Apple Podcasts (known on Apple's devices as system feature Podcasts) is an audio streaming service and media player application developed by Apple for playing podcasts. Apple began supporting podcasts with iTunes 4.9 released in June 2005 and launched its first standalone mobile app in 2012. The app was later pre-installed with iOS beginning October 2014. The Apple Podcasts directory features more than two million shows. Apple Podcasts is available on iOS, iPadOS, macOS, watchOS, tvOS, CarPlay, visionOS, Microsoft Windows operating systems, web browsers, and on Amazon Alexa devices.

== History ==
Apple was an early promoter of podcasts (the term is a portmanteau of Apple's iPod music player and "broadcast"), and added playback functionality to iTunes 4.9 released in June 2005 and built a directory of shows in its iTunes Music Store, starting with 3,000 entries. In April 2020, Apple Podcasts surpassed one million shows. In June 2021, Apple launched the option for podcast creators to implement paid subscriptions through podcast channels.

=== Market share ===
Apple Podcasts had an estimated 28 million American monthly listeners and 23.8% market share in March 2021, the first month it fell behind Spotify Podcasts as the top podcasting platform in the United States. This was a decrease from Apple's 34% market share in 2018.

In 2025 it was reported that Apple Podcasts had regained market share and had a 37.4% market share in the U.S. based on views and downloads of the top 250 podcasts in the U.S. This placed it ahead of Youtube (23.2%) and Spotify (15.2%) with all three combined having a 75.8% market share. Though it was also noted that Apple Podcasts Auto-downloads by default.

== Application platforms ==
=== iOS, tvOS, watchOS and visionOS versions ===
A standalone Apple Podcasts app was announced at the 2012 Worldwide Developers Conference as a feature of iOS 6. Apple released the app early on the App Store on June 26, 2012. It adds a new "stations" feature for discovering new podcasts. It is a standard app on CarPlay.

A standalone Apple Podcasts app was brought to 2nd and 3rd generation Apple TVs on September 24, 2012, with the Software 6.0 update. The tvOS-based 4th generation Apple TV launched in October 2015 without the ability to play podcasts. This was despite a Podcasts icon appearing on the home screen in commercials, in-store demo loops, and developer documentation. Apple Podcasts was added with tvOS 9.1.1 released on January 26, 2016.

Apple Podcasts was added to the Apple Watch with watchOS 5 on September 17, 2018.

On the WWDC 2023 (June 5, 2023) the Apple Vision Pro was announced and with that visionOS 1 with Apple Podcast.

On March 5, 2024, Apple added transcripts to the Podcasts app on iPhone and iPad with iOS 17.4 and iPadOS 17.4. Transcripts are available for English-, French-, Spanish-, and German-language podcasts

=== macOS and Windows versions ===
Apple Podcasts for macOS and Microsoft Windows was initially available as part of the iTunes app, which added support for podcasts in version 4.9 in June 2005.

Apple announced at WWDC 2019 that iTunes for macOS would be split and replaced by the Music, TV and Podcasts apps with the release of macOS Catalina. Apple Podcasts remains available through iTunes on Microsoft Windows.

=== Web version and other platforms ===
On August 19, 2024, 19 years after the initial launch of Apple's podcast directory on iTunes, Apple finally released a web interface for Apple Podcasts, expanding access to users without iTunes installed on their computers, and computers running operating systems other than Apple macOS and Microsoft Windows.

Unlike Apple Music, there is currently no Apple Podcasts app available for Android.

=== Smart speakers ===
Apple's HomePod family supports Podcasts using a voice user interface. Support for Apple Podcasts was added to the Amazon Echo line in December 2019.

== Apple Podcasts Award ==
#	Year	Show of the Year	Ref.
1	2022	Slow Burn	
2	2023	Wiser Than Me with Julia Louis-Dreyfus	
3	2024	Hysterical	
4	2025	The Rest Is History	

== Reception ==
Critical reviews of the Apple Podcasts app have generally been mixed. In 2012, Engadget stated it "offers an opportunity to break through the clutter of iTunes". In 2017, Slate criticized it for glitches and low-quality audio. In 2019, Vulture called the app "a bummer" and "bare-bones and fairly clunky, even when it comes to basic functions like subscribing."

== See also ==
- List of podcast clients
- Music (software)
- Apple Music
