= Music (app) =

Media player developed by Apple

- Library tab in the Music app
- Developer: Apple
- Release: iOS: June 29, 2007; 19 years ago (iPod); October 12, 2011; 15 years ago (Music); Android: November 10, 2015; 10 years ago; macOS: October 7, 2019; 7 years ago; Windows: January 12, 2023; 3 years ago
- Stable release: macOS: 1.6.0.151 / September 15, 2025; 13 months ago
- Operating system: iOS (all versions) watchOS (all versions) tvOS (all versions) iPadOS (all versions) visionOS (all versions) macOS Catalina and later Android 5.0 and later Windows 10 22H2 and later
- Predecessor: iPod (iOS) iTunes (macOS)
- License: Freeware

Music (also known as Apple Music, the Apple Music app, and the Music app) (Note: Referred to as simply "Music" in Apple operating systems, "Apple Music" on non-Apple devices and in the iOS App Store, and the "Music app" or "Apple Music app" on Apple's website) is a media player application developed for the iOS, iPadOS, macOS, watchOS, visionOS, tvOS, Android, and Windows operating systems by Apple. It can play music files stored locally on devices, as well as stream from the iTunes Store and Apple Music.

On iPhones and iPads running iOS 4 or older software, it was named "iPod". It was included in the initial releases of tvOS, watchOS, and iPadOS. It was released with macOS Catalina on October 7, 2019, as one of three applications created to replace iTunes. The Music app is differentiated from iTunes by its concentration on streaming media and lesser focus on the iTunes Store, where content may be purchased outright.

== iOS, tvOS, and watchOS versions ==
The Music app on iOS was initially released in iPhone OS 1 on iPhone as the iPod app. It was called Music on the iPod Touch. In iOS 5, iPhones and iPads share the Music app logo and name. It was updated with a redesign and functionality for Apple Music with iOS 8.4 in 2015. It is a standard app on CarPlay.

The Music app is available on 2nd and 3rd generation Apple TVs to stream music purchased from the iTunes Store or synced with iTunes Match, but was never updated with support for Apple Music. Apple Music support was added in the tvOS version on the 4th generation Apple TV in early November 2015.

The Music app has been included in every version of watchOS on the Apple Watch. Music can be downloaded directly to an Apple Watch for use without a paired iPhone.

== macOS version ==
The Music app on macOS was preceded by the iTunes app launched on January 9, 2001. Video support within the iTunes app was enabled in May 2005; podcast and books support followed in June 2005 and January 2010, respectively. By the 2010s, the application had been criticized for software bloat with features that extended well beyond the original scope of music.

Apple announced at the 2019 Worldwide Developers Conference that iTunes would be replaced with the specific Music app, Podcasts, and TV applications with the release of macOS Catalina. Apple describes the Music app as a "music streaming experience," whereas the company described iTunes as a digital library and online music store. Previous iTunes versions designed for older macOS versions, as well as iTunes for Windows, will remain unaffected. Music, TV shows and movies, and podcasts on the iTunes Store will be accessible through the Music, TV, and Podcasts apps, respectively, compared to the standalone iTunes Store app that is featured on iOS.

== Android version ==
The Music app was released for devices running Android Lollipop and later on November 10, 2015, where it is referred to as Apple Music. It marked the first time music from the iTunes Store was available on non-Apple mobile devices since the Rokr E1 during a brief partnership with Motorola in 2005. This version of the app does not allow access to iTunes Store purchases or iTunes Match, unless the user has an active Apple Music subscription.

== Windows version ==
On January 12, 2023, Apple released a beta version of Apple Music on the Microsoft Store for Windows 11, replacing the infrequently updated iTunes for Windows.
