= Clock (Apple) =

Timekeeping mobile app

- The World Clock feature in Clock on an iPhone 14 Pro running iOS 26
- Developer: Apple
Stable release
- macOS: 1.0 / October 24, 2022; 4 years ago
- Operating system: iOS; iPadOS; watchOS; macOS (13.0 or later)
- Type: Digital clock

Clock is a timekeeping mobile app available since the initial launch of the iPhone and iPhone OS 1 in 2007, with a version later released for iPads with iOS 6 (however could unofficially be installed before), and Macs with the release of macOS Ventura. The app consists of a world clock, alarm, stopwatch, and timer.

On watchOS, each function of the clock is split into four separate applications and in some cases offer additional or enhanced features. As a primary feature of the Apple Watch, a variety of customisable watch faces in both digital and analog formats are available for users to choose, which acts similar to the lock screen of an iPhone or iPad.

The app icon shows the device's current time when viewed from the home screen, making it one of the only iOS apps with a dynamic icon (the other being Calendar).

== Features ==
=== World Clock ===
The World Clock allows users to access the current time of different cities of their choosing from around the world. More locations can be added by tapping the plus icon at the top of the screen, or removed by swiping left on a location and clicking the delete button. On all versions except iOS, the world clock will also display the sunrise and sunset time for each location, as well as a map which displays where it is currently night and day.

=== Alarms ===
Alarms allow users to create new alarms, turn existing alarms on or off, or delete them. Alarms will play a chime and vibration once completed, which the user can choose from their music or ringtone libraries, and can be set to repeat on particular days of the week.

Users can also set a sleep schedule, which notifies users to wind down when their set bedtime is approaching and sets the device into sleep focus mode. It also creates a wake-up alarm, which has a number of unique chimes available. This feature integrates with the Health application to track sleep data.

=== Stopwatch ===
The Stopwatch allows users to measure how long events take, and pause, reset, or use the stopwatch's lap feature. Green and red type indicate the best and worst laps. Since iOS 10, an analogue stopwatch face can be accessed by swiping to the left. Additionally, the watchOS version of stopwatch also includes graph and hybrid faces.

=== Timer ===
The user can set a timer to count down from a specific time. When the timer reaches zero, a chime will be sounded chosen from the user's ringtone library. With the release of iOS 17, multiple timers can now be set at once and a list of recent timers is available for faster access. Similarly, watchOS provides a number of pre-set timer intervals.

As of iOS 11, the timer can be set from 1 second up to 23 hours, 59 minutes, and 59 seconds

=== Bedtime ===
In iOS 10 and later versions, there is a Bedtime feature which allows the user to get better sleep. This is done by determining when the user would like to wake up, how many days the alarm should go off, how many hours of sleep the user would like, and whether the user would want a bedtime notification. This feature also integrates with the Health application to track sleep data.

This feature was removed from iPads in iPadOS 14.
