= AssistiveTouch =

iOS accessibility feature

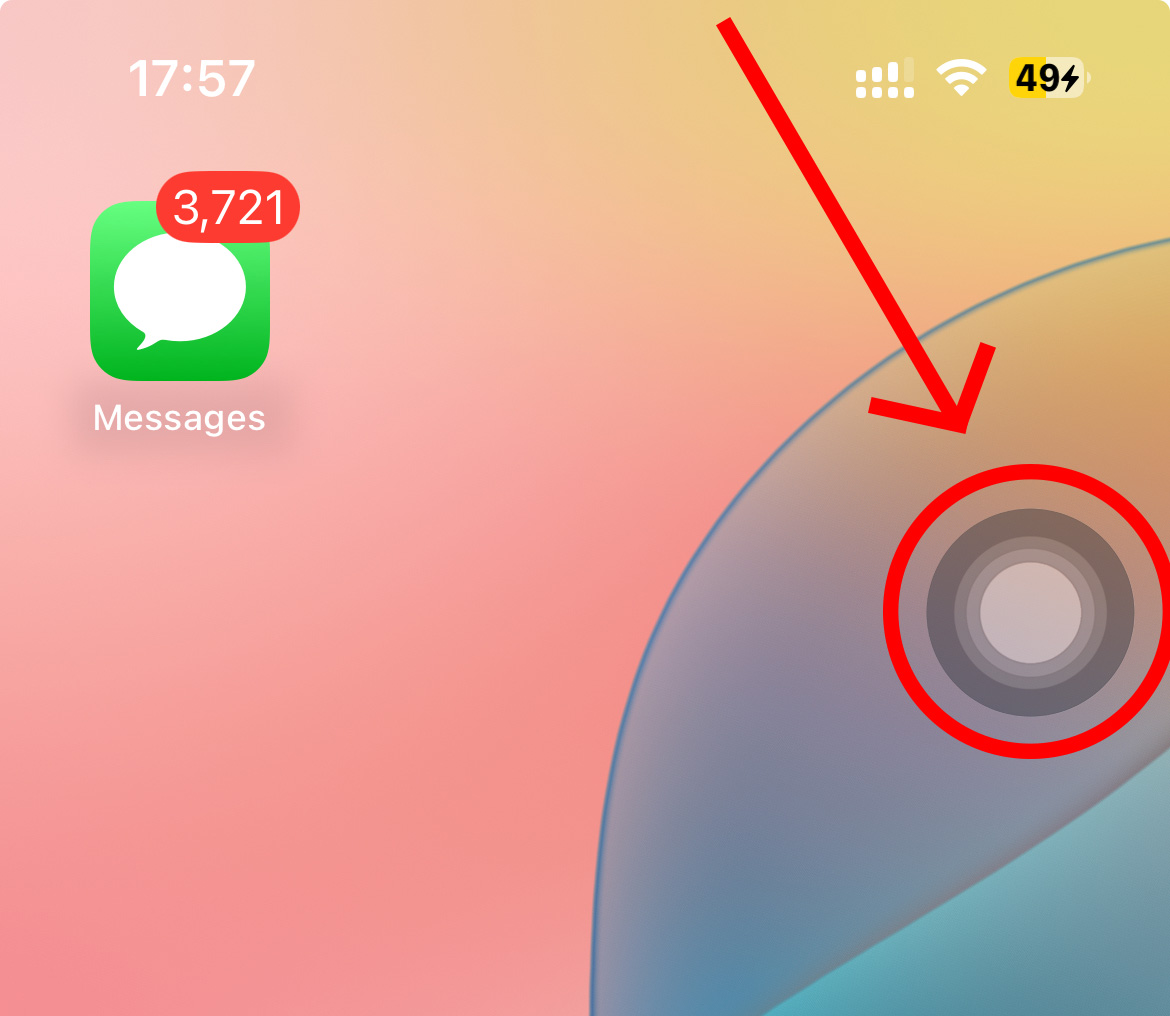
AssistiveTouch floating button on an iPhone home screen

AssistiveTouch is an accessibility feature introduced in iOS 5 in 2011 by Apple for its iOS, iPadOS, and watchOS operating systems. It provides an on-screen menu that allows users to perform hardware-related actions, such as pressing physical buttons or executing multi-finger gestures, through touch-based interaction controls.

Simplified gesture controls and customizable on-screen menus assist not only users with permanent motor impairments but also individuals experiencing situational limitations, such as operating a device with one hand while riding public transportation.

When enabled, a floating button appears on the screen that provides quick access to customizable device controls, including Home screen navigation, volume adjustment, screen locking, and other common functions.

As part of Apple's broader accessibility initiatives, AssistiveTouch provides a software-based alternative to hardware interaction, supporting a wide range of user needs.

== History and development ==
In its early form, AssistiveTouch offered the basic functionality of a floating button that gave users easy touch access to functions like the Home button and volume controls, as well as the ability to set up Quick Actions or their own gestures. Over several updates, Apple expanded the capabilities of AssistiveTouch to better reflect user needs and accommodate new software functionalities.

In iOS 13, Apple added custom gestures and mouse/trackpad support via AssistiveTouch, allowing users to navigate their devices with an external pointer. This expanded features for both users with disabilities and those who preferred alternative input methods.

In 2021, AssistiveTouch was introduced to the Apple Watch in watchOS 8. This leveraged the device's motion sensors and machine learning to allow users to navigate the device using various hand gestures, like pinching or clenching. This permitted hands-free navigation on the Apple Watch.

== Features ==
=== Floating menu interface ===
When AssistiveTouch is enabled, a movable circular button appears on the screen, which can be dragged to any edge. Tapping this button opens a menu of customizable controls such as Home, Siri, Volume, Lock Screen, and more.

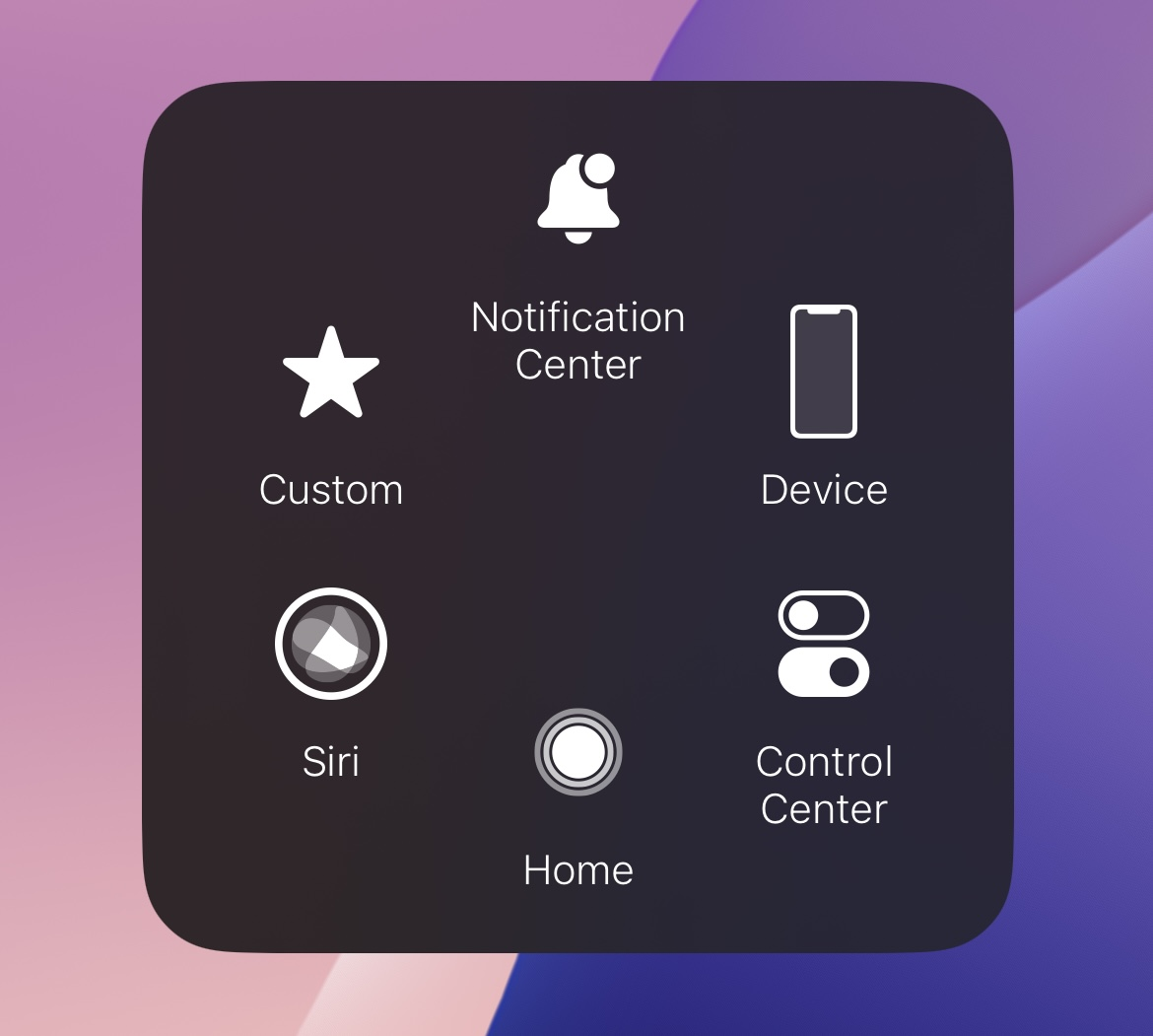
When pressed, a menu opens up featuring customizable controls.

=== Access to hardware functions ===
AssistiveTouch replicates hardware-based operations using software controls on its menu to perform actions like returning to the Home screen, activating Siri, taking screenshots, locking the screen, adjusting the volume, and activating the Shake function for undo actions. These features are particularly useful for users who may not be able to press physical buttons or perform gesture-based shortcuts.

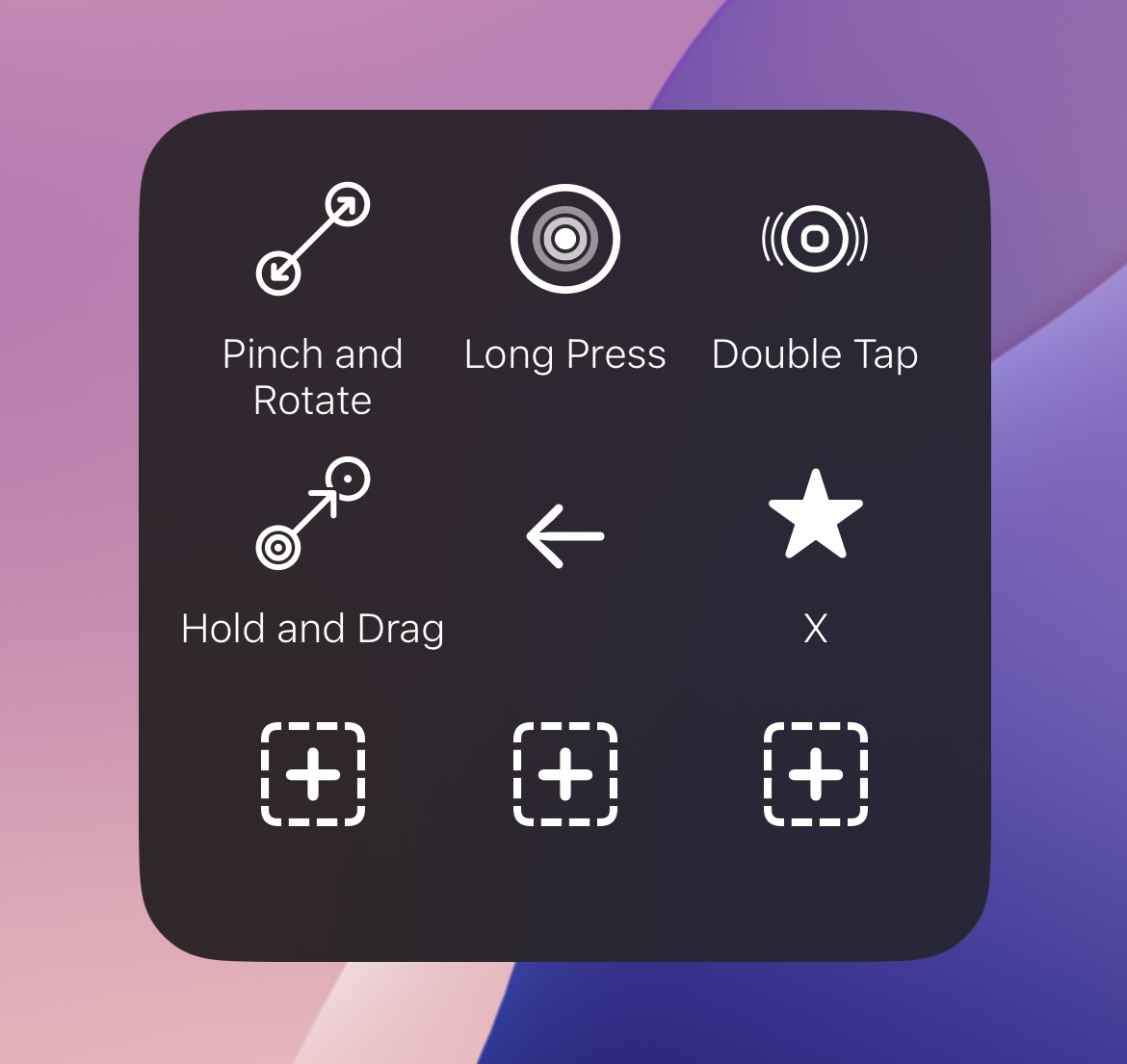
AssistiveTouch allows users to simulate multi-finger gestures like pinch, rotate, long press, and double tap with a single point of contact.

=== Gesture and multi-touch replacement ===
AssistiveTouch provides a method for users to input multi-finger gestures by enabling a gesture abstraction interface that allows a single point of contact to trigger a system-generated multi-point gesture. Users can select a gesture profile corresponding to 2, 3, 4, or 5 fingers. When a gesture profile is active, any path drawn with one finger is interpreted by the system as if it originated from multiple virtual touchpoints, spaced evenly and moving in parallel. This abstraction enables users to perform gestures such as two-finger scrolling, three-finger swiping, and predefined actions like pinch and rotate.

AssistiveTouch can be used in parallel with other accessibility features such as Zoom, which relies on path-based three-finger gestures like tap and drag for screen magnification.

=== Customization ===
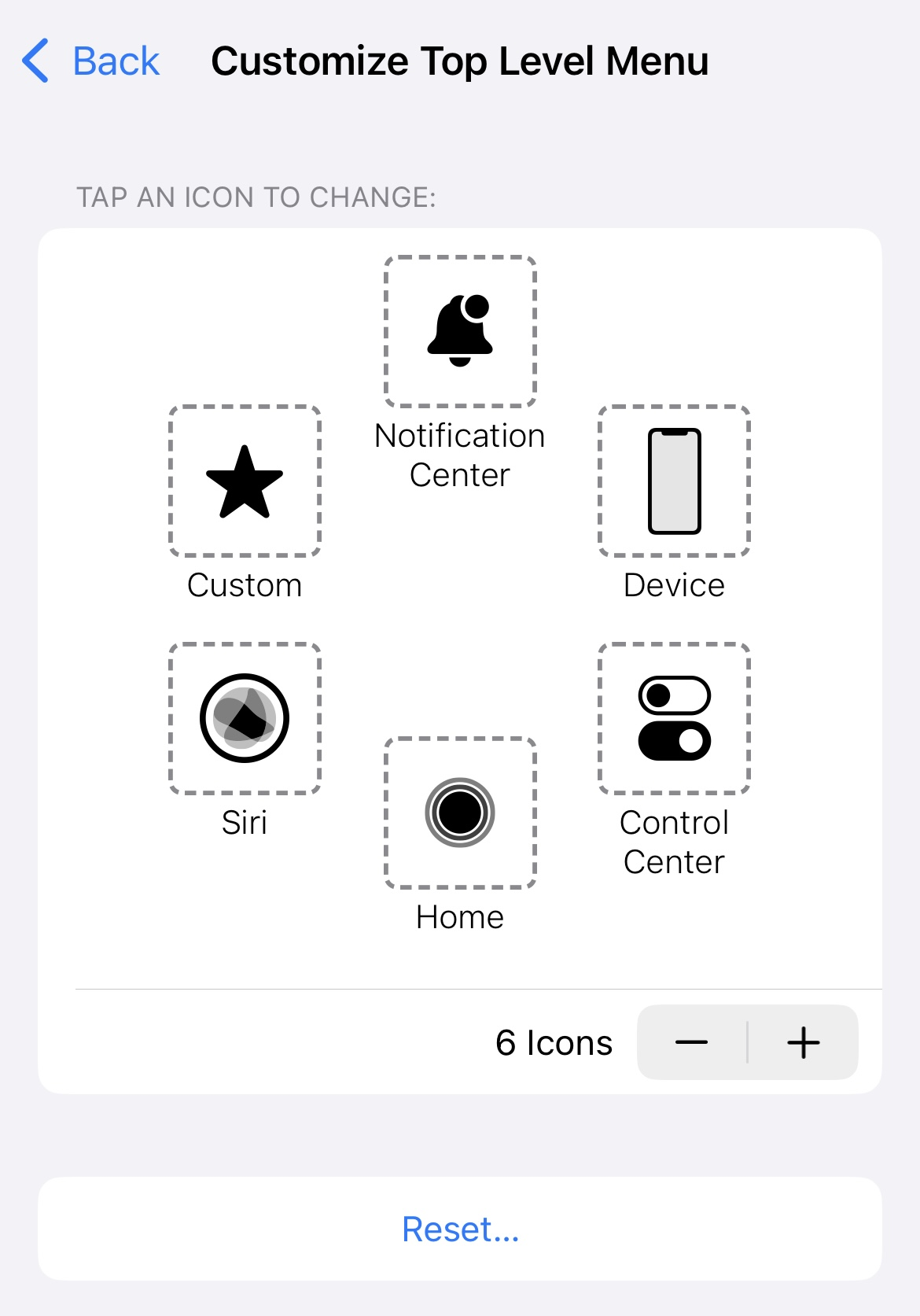
Users can customize the top-level menu by adding, removing, or rearranging actions like Notification Center, Siri, and Control Center to suit their personal preferences.

AssistiveTouch offers significant customization options: Users can customize the top-level AssistiveTouch menu by adding frequently used actions, rearranging existing items, and assigning specific functions to single-tap, double-tap, or long-press gestures. For example, a single tap might be configured to open the AssistiveTouch menu, a double-tap could trigger the Notification Center, and a long press might activate Siri.

Custom gestures can also be recorded and reused. The system captures the user's input path, such as a swipe or circular motion, and stores it as a reusable command, which can then be triggered from the menu.

=== Pointer device support ===
AssistiveTouch lets users control their iPhone with an external mouse, offering customizable pointer settings for accessibility.

AssistiveTouch also supports external pointer devices, such as Bluetooth mice or trackpads. When connected, users can enable features such as dwell control, adjust the pointer size, change the color of the pointer, and fine-tune its movement speed.

=== Activation Methods ===
AssistiveTouch can be activated through several means, including the system's accessibility settings, voice commands via Siri, and customizable shortcuts. These multiple access points allow for flexibility based on the user's physical capabilities.

Once enabled, the AssistiveTouch button remains on-screen and provides consistent access to assistive controls regardless of the application in use.

== Comparison to similar tools ==
AssistiveTouch is one of many accessibility tools embedded into operating systems to allow smoother interaction with touchscreen devices. On Android devices, a comparable feature is the Android Accessibility Menu, which was added in Android 9. It is an on-screen menu activated by swiping up with two fingers and selecting Accessibility, after toggling the shortcut in settings. The menu includes options to take screenshots, lock the screen, and adjust volume.

Samsung offers a floating icon known as the Assistant Menu, similar to AssistiveTouch, which provides shortcuts to hardware buttons and other functionalities. It also includes a cursor that simulates mouse control.

Third-party apps have also mimicked the functionality of an on-screen accessibility menu. For example, EasyTouch and Floating Toolbox on the Google Play Store offer floating menus with customizable shortcuts or quick app access.

Between iOS and Android, iOS is notable for having its accessibility features, including AssistiveTouch, integrated directly into the system. On the other hand, Android offers more diverse third-party accessibility tools that users can download.

== Reception and impact ==
AssistiveTouch has been generally well-received as an accessibility initiative, garnering positive feedback for its use of motion sensors and gesture recognition.

Maya Sellon, an inclusive design researcher, praised AssistiveTouch for offering an intuitive and hands-free way to use the Apple Watch. In her review, she noted how the feature could map actions to custom gestures, which expands basic Apple features like Siri and Apple Pay for users with motor disabilities. However, she also pointed out limitations: some gestures required physical strain to perform and necessitated a tight watch fit, both of which could be uncomfortable for some users.

Tech review sites like The Verge have highlighted the potential of AssistiveTouch beyond accessibility, noting its usefulness in hands-free scenarios such as while cooking. However, some academics have raised concerns about the feature's limitations. Like Sellon's research, studies have emphasized the physical demands of the required gestures, which may be unrealistic for users with conditions like cerebral palsy. These critiques have called for more adaptable input options that support a wider range of motor abilities.

Following AssistiveTouch's launch, Apple has continued developing gesture-based controls. In watchOS 10, the company introduced a double-tap feature on the Apple Watch, which enables simple actions like playing or pausing music, answering or ending calls, and managing alarms or timers with a gesture.
