= Calendar (Apple) =

Personal calendar application for macOS and iOS by Apple

- Calendar running on macOS Big Sur
- Developer: Apple
- Stable release: macOS: 26.5
- Operating system: macOS, iOS, watchOS, iPadOS and visionOS
- Type: Calendaring software
- Website: support.apple.com/guide/calendar/welcome/mac

Calendar is a personal calendar app made by Apple for its macOS, iOS, iPadOS, watchOS and visionOS operating systems. It offers online cloud backup of calendars using Apple's iCloud service, or can synchronize with other calendar services, including Google Calendar and Microsoft Exchange Server.

The macOS version was known as iCal before the release of OS X Mountain Lion in July 2012. Originally released as a free download for Mac OS X Jaguar, on September 10, 2002, it was bundled with the operating system as iCal 1.5 with the release of Mac OS X Panther. iCal was the first calendar application for Mac OS X to offer support for multiple calendars and the ability to intermittently publish/subscribe to calendars on WebDAV servers. Version 2 of iCal was released as part of Mac OS X Tiger, Version 3 as part of Mac OS X Leopard, Version 4 as part of Mac OS X Snow Leopard, Version 5 as part of Mac OS X Lion, Version 6 as part of OS X Mountain Lion, Version 7 as part of OS X Mavericks, Version 8 as part of OS X Yosemite and OS X El Capitan, and version 9 as part of macOS Sierra.

Apple licensed the iCal name from Brown Bear Software, who have used it for their iCal application since 1997.

iCal's initial development was quite different from other Apple software: it was designed independently by a small French team working "secretly" in Paris, led by Jean-Marie Hullot, a friend of Steve Jobs. iCal's development has since been transferred to Apple US headquarters in Cupertino.

== Features ==
Calendar tracks events and appointments, allows multiple calendar views (such as calendars for "home", "work", and other calendars that a user can create) to quickly identify conflicts and free time. Users can subscribe to other calendars so they can keep up with friends and colleagues, and other things such as athletic schedules and television programs, as well as set notifications for upcoming events either in the Notification Center, by email, SMS, or pager. Attachments and notes can be added to iCloud Calendar items.

It is integrated with iCloud, so calendars can be shared and synced with other devices, such as other Macs, iPhones, iPads, iPod touch, and PCs over the internet. One can also share calendars via the WebDAV protocol. Google now supports WebDAV for Google Calendar making Calendar easily configurable.

Calendar includes the ability to see travel time and weather at the event's location, with the ability to set an alarm based on the travel time. Different time zones can be selected when entering and editing start and end times. This allows long-distance airplane flight times, for example, to be entered accurately and for that "end" of a visualized time "box" to render accurately on either iOS or macOS when time zone support is turned on in Calendar and the time zone set in Date/Time to the location in question.

Calendar support was added to CarPlay with iOS 13, allowing Siri to display and read out a user's upcoming events while driving.

The app icon shows the device's current date when viewed from the home screen, making it one of the only iOS apps with a dynamic icon (the other being Clock).

On the WWDC 2023 Apple introduced the Apple Vision Pro and the operating system visionOS with the Apple Calendar.

== See also ==
- Calendar and Contacts Server
- iCalendar
- SyncML open standard for calendar syncing
