= ITunes =

Apple's media library and media player software

iTunes

- Screenshot of iTunes 12.13.4.4 on Windows 10
- Developer: Apple
- Release: January 9, 2001; 25 years ago
- Stable release: 12.13.11 / September 8, 2026; 2 months ago
- Operating system: macOS Mojave and earlier (until version 12.9.5) (Note: Can be installed on macOS Catalina to macOS Sequoia using third-party software.); Windows 10 and 11 (latest version)
- Platform: macOS; Windows
- Successor: For media: TV (macOS and Windows); Music (macOS and Windows); Podcasts (macOS only) For device management: Finder (macOS); Apple Devices (Windows)
- Type: CD ripper; Digital asset management; Media player; Optical disc authoring; Tag editor
- License: Freeware
- Website: itunes.com

iTunes is a media player, media library, and mobile device management (MDM) utility developed by Apple. It is used to purchase, play, download and organize digital multimedia on personal computers running the Windows (and formerly macOS) operating systems, and can be used to rip songs from CDs as well as to play content from dynamic playlists. It includes options for sound optimization and wireless sharing.

iTunes was announced by Apple CEO Steve Jobs on January 9, 2001. Its original and main focus was music, with a library offering organization and storage of Mac users' music collections. With the addition in 2003 of the iTunes Store for purchasing and downloading digital music and a Windows version of the program, it became a ubiquitous tool for managing music and configuring other features on Apple's line of iPod media players, which extended to the iPhone and iPad upon their introduction. From 2005 on, Apple expanded its core music features with support for digital video, podcasts, e-books, and mobile apps purchased from the iOS App Store. The release of iOS 5 in 2011 made these devices less dependent on iTunes, though it could still be used to back up their contents.

Though well received in its early years, iTunes received increasing criticism for a bloated user experience with the incorporation of several non-music features that built up over time. In October 2019, beginning with Macs running macOS Catalina, iTunes was replaced by separate apps, namely Music, Podcasts, and TV, with Finder taking over device management capabilities. In February 2024, most features of iTunes for Windows were split into the Apple TV, Music, and Apple Devices apps, while iTunes is still used for podcasts and audiobooks as there is currently no Windows version of Apple Podcasts. These changes did not affect older macOS versions (macOS Mojave and earlier), or users who prefer not to switch to the UWP-based apps on Windows; the iTunes program remains accessible for Music, Movies, TV Shows, Podcasts, Audiobooks on these platforms.

== History ==
SoundJam MP, released by Casady & Greene in 1999, was renamed "iTunes" when Apple purchased it the next year. The primary developers of the software moved to Apple as part of the acquisition, and simplified SoundJam's user interface, added the ability to burn CDs, and removed its recording feature and skin support. The first version of iTunes, promotionally dubbed "World's Best and Easiest To Use Jukebox Software", was announced on January 9, 2001. Subsequent releases of iTunes often coincided with new hardware devices, and gradually included support for new features, including "smart playlists", the iTunes Store, and new audio formats.

=== Platform availability ===
Apple released iTunes for Windows on October 16, 2003.

On April 26, 2018, iTunes was released on Microsoft Store for Windows 10, primarily to allow it to be installed on Windows 10 devices configured to only allow installation of software from Microsoft Store. Unlike Windows versions for other platforms, it is more self-contained due to technical requirements for distribution on the store (not installing background helper services such as Bonjour), and is updated automatically through the store rather than using Apple Software Update.

The role of iTunes has been replaced with independent apps, Apple Music, Apple Podcasts, Apple Books, and Apple TV; with iPhone, iPod, and iPad management integrated into the Finder starting with macOS 10.15 Catalina, and appearing as Apple Devices starting with Windows 10.

Content	Availability on Windows	Availability on macOS
Music	Available in iTunes and Apple Music app (Note: iTunes Store web links can be opened in the iTunes application with a custom URI scheme, by replacing https:// with itms://) (Note: Only one app can be installed at the same time. iTunes will operate in reduced functionality (Podcasts and Audiobooks only) when both apps are detected on the same computer.)	Moved to Apple Music app in macOS Catalina and later
Movies	Available in iTunes and Apple TV app	Moved to Apple TV app in macOS Catalina and later
TV Shows	Available in iTunes and Apple TV app	Moved to Apple TV app in macOS Catalina and later
Podcasts	Available in iTunes	Moved to Apple Podcasts app in macOS Catalina and later
Audiobooks	Available in iTunes	Moved to Apple Books app in macOS Catalina and later
Books	Removed in iTunes 12.7; no replacement app has been released.	Moved to Apple Books app in macOS Catalina and later
Device Management (iPhone, iPad, iPod)	Available in iTunes and Apple Devices app	Moved to Finder app in macOS Catalina and later
iTunes U	Discontinued in December 2021; replaced by Classroom and Schoolwork iPad apps.	
Apps	Removed in iTunes 12.7 in 2017; support was temporarily backported and extended to iTunes 12.6.5 in 2018. (Note: Newer versions of iTunes can still browse the iOS App Store via this link itms://apps.apple.com/us/genre/ios/id36, but not download apps.)	
Ringtones	Removed in iTunes 12.7 in 2017.	
Internet Radio	Removed in iTunes 12.7 in 2017.	

== Music library ==
iTunes features a music library. Each track has attributes, called metadata, that can be edited by the user, including changing the name of the artist, album, and genre, year of release, artwork, among other additional settings. The software supports importing digital audio tracks that can then be transferred to iOS devices, as well as supporting ripping content from CDs. iTunes supports WAV, AIFF, Apple Lossless, AAC, and MP3 audio formats. It uses the Gracenote music database to provide track name listings for audio CDs. When users rip content from a CD, iTunes attempts to match songs to the Gracenote service. For self-published CDs, or those from obscure record labels, iTunes would normally only list tracks as numbered entries ("Track 1" and "Track 2") on an unnamed album by an unknown artist, requiring manual input of data.

File metadata is displayed in users' libraries in columns, including album, artist, genre, composer, and more. Users can enable or disable different columns, as well as change view settings.

=== Special playlists ===
Introduced in 2004, "Party Shuffle" selected tracks to play randomly from the library, though users could press a button to skip a song and go to the next in the list. The feature was later renamed "iTunes DJ", before being discontinued altogether, replaced by a simpler "Up Next" feature that notably lost some of "iTunes DJ"'s functionality.

Introduced in iTunes 8 in 2008, "Genius" can automatically generate a playlist of songs from the user's library that "go great together". "Genius" transmits information about the user's library to Apple anonymously, and evolves over time to enhance its recommendation system. It can also suggest purchases to fill out "holes" in the library. The feature was updated with iTunes 9 in 2009 to offer "Genius Mixes", which generated playlists based on specific music genres.

"Smart playlists" are a set of playlists that can be set to automatically filter the library based on a customized list of selection criteria, much like a database query. Multiple criteria can be entered to manage the smart playlist. Selection criteria examples include a genre like Christmas music, songs that have not been played recently, or songs the user has listened to the most in a time period.

=== Library sharing ===
Through a "Home Sharing" feature, users can share their iTunes library wirelessly. Computer firewalls must allow network traffic, and users must specifically enable sharing in the iTunes preferences menu. iOS applications also exist that can transfer content without Internet. Additionally, users can set up a network-attached storage system, and connect to that storage system through an app.

=== Sound processing ===
iTunes includes sound processing features, such as equalization, "sound enhancement" and crossfade. There is also a feature called Sound Check, which normalizes the playback volume of all songs in the library to the same level.

== Online music functionality ==
=== iTunes Store ===
Introduced on April 28, 2003, The iTunes Music Store allows users to buy and download songs, with 200,000 tracks available at launch. In its first week, customers bought more than one million songs. Music purchased was protected by FairPlay, an encryption layer referred to as digital rights management (DRM). The use of DRM, which limited devices capable of playing purchased files, sparked efforts to remove the protection mechanism. Eventually, after an open letter to the music industry by CEO Steve Jobs in February 2007, Apple introduced a selection of DRM-free music in the iTunes Store in April 2007, followed by its entire music catalog without DRM in January 2009.

=== iTunes in the Cloud and iTunes Match ===
In June 2011, Apple announced "iTunes in the Cloud", in which music purchases are stored on Apple's servers and made available for automatic downloading on other devices signed into the same account and, subject to continued availability, redownloading. Previously, purchases of music, video content, and iPod games (but not iOS apps) entitled the buyer to a single successful download. For music the user owns, such as content ripped from CDs, the company introduced "iTunes Match", a feature that can upload content to Apple's servers, match it to its catalog, change the quality to 256 kbit/s AAC format, and make it available to other devices.

=== Internet radio, iTunes Radio and Apple Music ===
When iTunes was first released, it came with support for the Kerbango Internet radio tuner service. In June 2013, the company announced iTunes Radio, a free music streaming service. In June 2015, Apple announced Apple Music, a subscription-based music streaming service, and subsequently integrated iTunes Radio functionality. Music tracks provided by Apple Music via iTunes are available at up to 256 kbit/s AAC fidelity. The Apple Music app also integrates Apple Music 1, a live music radio station.

=== Relocation of iTunes Features ===
As of 2024, Apple is phasing out iTunes in favour of three dedicated apps, Music, Podcasts, and TV, but the iTunes Store will still remain.

== Other features ==
=== Video ===
In May 2005, video support was introduced to iTunes with the release of iTunes 4.8, though it was limited to bonus features part of album purchases. The following October, Apple introduced iTunes 6, enabling support for purchasing and viewing video content purchased from the iTunes Store. At launch, the store offered popular shows from the ABC network, including Desperate Housewives and Lost, along with Disney Channel series That's So Raven and The Suite Life of Zack & Cody. CEO Steve Jobs told the press that "We're doing for video what we've done for music — we're making it easy and affordable to purchase and download, play on your computer, and take with you on your iPod."

In 2008, Apple and select film studios introduced "iTunes Digital Copy", a feature on select DVDs and Blu-ray discs allowing a digital copy in iTunes and associated media players.

=== Podcasts ===
The icon used by Apple to represent a podcast

In June 2005, Apple updated iTunes with support for podcasts. Users can subscribe to podcasts, change update frequency, define how many episodes to download and how many to delete.

Similar to songs, "Smart playlists" can be used to control podcasts in a playlist, setting criteria such as date and number of times listened to.

Apple is credited for being the major catalyst behind the early growth of podcasting.

=== Apps ===
On July 10, 2008, Apple introduced native mobile apps for its iOS operating system. On iOS, a dedicated App Store application served as the storefront for browsing, downloading, updating, and otherwise managing applications, whereas iTunes on computers had a dedicated section for apps rather than a separate app. In September 2017, Apple updated iTunes to version 12.7, removing the App Store section in the process. iTunes 12.6.3 was released the following month, retaining App Store functionality, with 9to5Mac noting that the secondary release was positioned by Apple as "necessary for some businesses performing internal app deployments".. As of macOS 10.15 Catalina, the iTunes app has been replaced with the Music app, while still holding some iTunes functionality (such as browsing the store and buying items)

=== iTunes U ===
In May 2007, Apple announced the launch of "iTunes U" via the iTunes Store, which delivers university lectures from top U.S. colleges. With iTunes version 12.7 in August 2017, iTunes U collections became a part of the Podcasts app. On June 10, 2020, Apple formally announced that iTunes U would be discontinued at the end of 2021.

=== Apple mobile device connectivity ===
iTunes is required to activate early iPhone, iPod Touch, and iPad devices, although beginning with the iPhone 3G in June 2008 the devices could be activated at the point of sale by participating retailers. Since iOS 5, iOS devices can alternatively be activated and set-up on their own without requiring the use of iTunes.

iTunes also allows users to backup and restore the content of their Apple mobile devices, such as messages, photos, videos, application data and device settings and update or restore the firmware of their devices. However, as of iTunes 12.7, apps can no longer be purchased and installed using iTunes.

=== Ping ===
With the release of iTunes 10 in September 2010, Apple announced iTunes Ping, which CEO Steve Jobs described as "social music discovery". It had features reminiscent of Facebook, including profiles and the ability to follow other users. Ping was discontinued in September 2012.

== Criticism ==
=== Security ===
The Telegraph reported in November 2011 that Apple had been aware of a security vulnerability since 2008 that would let unauthorized third parties install "updates" to users' iTunes software. Apple fixed the issue before the Telegraph's report and told the media that "The security and privacy of our users is extremely important", though this was questioned by security researcher Brian Krebs, who told the publication that "A prominent security researcher warned Apple about this dangerous vulnerability in mid-2008, yet the company waited more than 1,200 days to fix the flaw."

=== Software bloat ===
iTunes has been repeatedly accused of being bloated as part of Apple's efforts to turn it from a music player to an all-encompassing multimedia platform. Former PC World editor Ed Bott accused the company of hypocrisy in its advertising attacks on Windows for similar practices.

== See also ==
- Apple Music
- Apple Music Festival
- AirPlay
- Digital distribution
- List of audio conversion software
- Comparison of audio player software
- Music visualization
