= Apple Watch Ultra =

Line of smartwatches

- Apple Watch Ultra 4
- Developer: Apple
- Manufacturer: Quanta Computer; Compal Electronics; (contract manufacturer)
- Type: Smartwatch
- Released: Ultra: September 23, 2022; 4 years ago Ultra 2: September 22, 2023; 3 years ago Ultra 3: September 19, 2025; 13 months ago Ultra 4: September 18, 2026; 53 days ago
- Operating system: watchOS
- Website: apple.com/watch

The Apple Watch Ultra is a line of sport smartwatches produced by Apple as part of the Apple Watch product line. Introduced in September 2022, they are marketed towards endurance athletes and outdoor recreation, and carry a rugged form factor with a wider band, a larger, brighter display, multi-band GPS, a larger battery, water temperature sensor, and additional functionality for diving.

Apple Watch Ultra 3 Titanium case Ocean band (2026)

== Hardware ==
The Apple Watch Ultra hardware is generally similar to the main Apple Watch line (with the first-generation model based on the Apple Watch Series 8), but is differentiated by their rugged titanium casing, a larger 49 mm band, and a larger display with a flat crystal and higher brightness of up to 2000 nits. It supports multi-band GPS on L1 and L5. The Ultra includes a new, orange-colored “Action” button, which can be mapped to different functions, as well as an emergency siren feature. The Apple Watch Ultra contains a battery 76% larger than that of the Series 8, which Apple rated at 36 hours of usage without using power saving modes (as opposed to Apple's rating of 18 hours on the main line). A power saving mode which reduces the amount of heart rate readings and GPS polling can extend its battery life to around 60 hours. All Apple Watch Ultra models include cellular connectivity.

The Apple Watch Ultra has a water temperature sensor, and carries WR100 and EN13319 certification. Apple rates the device for diving to depths of up to 40 metres (130 ft); a new “Depth” app is included for displaying depth and water temperature information, while Apple partnered with Oceanic Worldwide to release the subscription-based “Oceanic Plus” app for more advanced dive computer functionality.

== Models ==
The first-generation Apple Watch Ultra was unveiled September 7, 2022 alongside Apple Watch Series 8, and began shipping September 23, 2022.

The Apple Watch Ultra 2 was unveiled on September 22, 2023, alongside the Apple Watch Series 9; alongside the updated hardware inherited from Series 9, its screen brightness was further increased to 3000 nits. In December 2023, the Apple Watch Series 9 and Ultra 2 were temporarily pulled from the U.S. market due to patent litigation by Masimo. They returned to sale on January 18, 2024, with models sold after this date having blood oxygen monitoring features disabled. On September 9, 2024, Apple unveiled a black colour option for the Apple Watch Ultra 2, as well as a sleep apnea detection feature. On August 14, 2025, Apple announced a software update re-enabling blood oxygen monitoring features for U.S. users. Sensor data is now analysed on a paired iPhone instead of the watch. On September 9, 2025, Apple unveiled the Apple Watch Ultra 3 with an official release date of September 19, 2025. The Apple Watch Ultra 4 was unveiled on September 9th, 2026, alongside the series 12. It features the new S11 chip and an advanced health sensing system. The Ultra 4 now tracks the heart rate every 5 seconds, which was a 60-fold increase in frequency compared to the background tracking intervals of the previous generation.

== Reception ==
Victoria Song of The Verge felt that the first-generation Apple Watch Ultra was "a great first attempt at a rugged smartwatch" and "legitimately good for weekend warriors and intermediate athletes", noting features such as the Action button (which she believed should be added to the main Apple Watch line as well) and multi-band GPS, and the larger screen being easier to read. She felt that the Ultra benefitted from the new mapping and compass features (such as BackTrack) introduced by watchOS 9. She noted that Apple's battery life estimations were conservative in comparison to real-world use, where she regularly got closer to 48 hours of battery life during regular exercise use without using power saving modes, and another Verge staff member reported 56 hours via general, non-fitness use at home. However, she noted that the Apple Watch line still lacked certain features (including longer battery life, offline maps and trail navigation, and transflective displays) and fitness metrics in comparison to competitors such as Garmin and Polar, but that watchOS still "runs circles around fitness watches in terms of connectivity and simplicity".
