= Apple Devices =

Windows software for managing iOS devices

- Developer: Apple Inc.
- Release: September 20, 2022; 4 years ago
- Stable release: 2.1 / May 1, 2025; 18 months ago
- Operating system: Windows 11 and Windows 10 22H2 and
- Platform: Windows
- Size: 455.7 MB
- License: Freeware
- Website: support.apple.com/en-au/guide/devices-windows/welcome/windows

Apple Devices is a Windows application created to manage, back up, restore, and sync Apple devices (iPhone, iPad, iPod) directly from a PC. It was released in February 2024 and is part of Apple's split of iTunes into separate apps. The application is distributed through the Microsoft Store for Windows 10 version 22H2 and later and is unique to Windows, because device management functionality is integrated into Finder on macOS.

Similar to the build of iTunes released through the Microsoft Store, Apple Devices utilizes an embedded copy of Apple Application Support, along with its components such as MobileDevice. In contrast to iTunes, which relies on a port of macOS's AppKit to Win32, Apple Devices has been rebuilt using the Windows Runtime and Windows UI Library. It leverages the AMPDevices core frameworks, akin to those employed by Finder.

== Version history ==
Version	Release date	Notes
1.0.9729.0	2023	Initial preview release.
1.0.27906.0	2023	
1.512.9729.0	2023	
1.768.13825.0	2023	
1.1025.6145.0	2023	
1.1026.8961.0	2023	
1.1027.8449.0	2023	Adds iPhone 15 graphics.
1.1028.9986.0	2024	Exits preview, becoming the recommended method for syncing iOS devices on Windows.
1.1030.20993.0	2024	
1.1030.21762.0	2024	
1.1030.22273.0	2024	
1.1031.15873.0	2024	
1.1031.17413.0	2024	
1.1280.38913.0	2024	
1.1280.40963.0	2024	
1.1282.14849.0	2024	
1.1282.15361.0	2025	
2.1	2025	Current stable release.
