= WatchOS =

Apple Watch operating system

watchOS

- Siri Modular watch face on watchOS 27.
- Developer: Apple
- Written in: C; C++; Objective-C; Swift; assembly language
- OS family: Unix-like, iOS based on Darwin
- Working state: Current
- Source model: Closed, with open-source components
- Initial release: April 24, 2015; 11 years ago
- Latest release: 27.2.1 (November 9, 2026; 7 days ago) [±]
- Marketing target: Smartwatch
- Available in: 45 languages
- Update method: OTA (via iPhone 5 and later running iOS 8.2 and later)
- Supported platforms: ARMv8-A (5.0–present); ARMv7-A (1.0–8.8.2)
- Kernel type: Hybrid (XNU)
- Default user interface: Cocoa Touch (GUI)
- License: Proprietary software except for open-source components
- Official website: apple.com/os/watchos

Articles in the series

watchOS is the operating system of the Apple Watch, created and developed by Apple. It is based on iOS, the operating system used by the iPhone, and has many similar features. Its original version was released on April 24, 2015, along with the Apple Watch, the only device that runs watchOS. watchOS exposes an API called WatchKit for developer use.

== Interface overview ==
The home screen, rendered by and also known as "Carousel", consists of circular application icons that can be launched by touching the display, which allows users to access their favorite apps.

Prior to watchOS 3, "Glances" offered quick access to summaries of the most frequently used native and third-party applications. The Glances view was opened with a swipe-up gesture from the watch face screen. In watchOS 3, Glances were replaced with a redesigned Control Center that mirrors the functionality seen in iOS, providing a more unified experience across Apple devices. The Control Center is accessed with a swipe-up gesture from the watch face screen. Additionally, the friends menu, previously activated with the side button, was repurposed as a dedicated dock for apps, enhancing multitasking and app management.

Prior to watchOS 7, different actions and options appeared depending on whether the user taps or deep-presses, detected with the pressure-sensitive (Force Touch) Display. Force Touch was completely removed in watchOS 7, and all actions requiring the feature were moved to specific options in the Settings app or to long-press actions. With the launch of watchOS 7, Force Touch technology was phased out. This feature was replaced by additional options in the Settings app and extended press gestures to accommodate all necessary interactions, making it more consistent with other Apple devices that do not support Force Touch.

== Supported health metrics ==
Since its inception, watchOS has supported an increasing number and variety of health metrics for measurement and tracking. These include:

- heart rate
- maximal aerobic capacity, otherwise known as VO_{2} max. (added in watchOS 4, enhanced in watchOS 7)
- electrocardiogram, otherwise known as EKG or ECG (added in watchOS 5.1.2)
- blood oxygen saturation, otherwise known as SpO_{2} (added in watchOS 7)
- menstrual cycle status (added in watchOS 6)
- sleep duration & respiratory rate tracking (added in watchOS 7)
- body temperature tracking (added in watchOS 9)
- sleep apnea detection (added in watchOS 11)

== HealthKit ==
For several years, Apple has been developing its HealthKit product in an attempt to penetrate the lucrative healthcare and wellness industry, which CB Insights believe holds a huge growth opportunity for Apple. This was confirmed by Jony Ive, Apple's former chief designer, in an interview. He said that health was a crucial element in the Apple Watch since the day of its inception and that the developmental trajectory of the hardware and the watchOS were geared towards health-based capabilities. Ive pointed out that one of the primary apps that shipped with the first watchOS allowed users to track and communicate as well as encourage them to move, exercise, and stand. He said:

Many of us have our phones with us all the time, but they aren't connected to you. Imagine having something this powerful with you at all times, and what opportunities that might present to the user. The opportunity is phenomenal. Particularly when [you] don't understand just where we are today in terms of technology and capability, but where we are headed.

Applications have been developed for watchOS that not only keep users active but also diagnose illnesses. For example, the app called DeepHeart, a deep-learning network that can detect atrial fibrillation, hypertension, sleep apnea, and diabetes. It taps into the HealthKit platform to collect data, particularly those collected by the Apple Watch's heart sensor.

== Version history ==
=== Overview ===
Overview of watchOS versions
Version	Initial release date	Latest version	Latest release date	Device end-of-life			
Version	Initial release date	Latest version	Latest release date	SE	Series	Ultra	iPhone
watchOS 1	April 24, 2015	1.0.1	May 19, 2015	—N/a			—N/a
watchOS 2	September 21, 2015	2.2.2	July 18, 2016	—N/a			—N/a
watchOS 3	September 13, 2016	3.2.3	July 19, 2017	—N/a			5, 5C
watchOS 4	September 19, 2017	4.3.2	July 9, 2018	—N/a	0	—N/a	—N/a
watchOS 5	September 17, 2018	5.3.10	March 24, 2026	—N/a			5S, 6
watchOS 6	September 19, 2019	6.3.1	February 2, 2026	—N/a	1, 2	—N/a	—N/a
watchOS 7	September 16, 2020	7.6.2	September 13, 2021	—N/a			—N/a
watchOS 8	September 20, 2021	8.8.2	March 24, 2026	—N/a	3	—N/a	6S, SE (1st), 7
watchOS 9	September 12, 2022	9.6.4	February 2, 2026	—N/a			8, X
watchOS 10	September 18, 2023	10.6.2	February 2, 2026	1st	4, 5	—N/a	—N/a
watchOS 11	September 16, 2024	11.6.2	February 5, 2026	—N/a			XS, XR
watchOS 26	September 15, 2025	26.6.1	November 9, 2026	2	6, 7, 8	1st	—N/a
watchOS 27	September 14, 2026	27.2.1	November 9, 2026	TBA			
Legend: Unsupported Supported Latest version Preview version

=== watchOS 1 ===
The first version of watchOS 1 was 1.0 and was based on iOS 8.2. The second version of watchOS 1 was 1.0.1 and was based on iOS 8.3.

Overview of watchOS 1 versions
watchOS version	iOS version based on	Build	Release date	Features
1.0	8.2	12S507	April 24, 2015	Initial release on Apple Watch (1st Generation).: UI; Free-floating Circular app icons in home screen.; Zoom in with Digital Crown.; 9 watch faces: Chronograph, Color, Modular, Utility, Mickey Mouse, Simple, Motion, Solar, Astronomy; 20 stock apps: Activity, Alarm, Calendar, Camera Remote, Mail, Maps, Messages, Music, Passbook, Phone, Photos, Remote, Settings, Siri, Stocks, Stopwatch, Timer, Weather, Workout, World Clock.
1.0.1	8.3	12S632	May 19, 2015	Display support for new Emoji characters.; Notification screen UI tweaks.; Improved performance: Free floating Circular app icons in home screen.; Zoom in with Digital Crown.; Siri.; Measuring stand activity.; Calculating calories for indoor cycling and rowing workouts.; Distance and pace during outdoor walk and run.; Accessibility.; Third-party apps.; Wrist Raise (more sensitive to real-life wrist raises).; Additional language support: Brazilian Portuguese, Danish, Dutch, Swedish, Russian, Thai, Turkish.; Security fixes

=== watchOS 2 ===
Overview of watchOS 2 versions
watchOS version	iOS version based on	Build	Release date	Features
2.0	9.0	13S344	September 21, 2015	New Watch faces: Time-lapse face: Hong Kong, London, Mack Lake, New York, Shanghai, Paris; Photo & Photo album faces with support for Live Photos; New Time Travel function where you can see both past and future events; Nightstand Mode; 9 new colors for customization; New multicolor Modular face; 3rd party apps Complications support; Siri: Workout and Maps support; FaceTime audio calling and email replying support; HomeKit support; Added support in following countries: Austria, Belgium, Norway; Activity and Workout: Workouts done in 3rd-party apps will be included in Activity rings; Sharing support from Activity app on iPhone; Interactive achievements; Weekly Summary; Activity notifications can now be muted for a day; Workouts can now be automatically saved; Apple Pay and Wallet: Discover cards support; Reward cards, store credit and debit cards support; Passes can now be added from 3rd party apps; Friends: You can now add more than 12 friends to your Watch; Groups support; Multicolor sketches support; Animated emoji support; Maps: New Transit view in selected cities; List of directions can now be shown; Station placards support with departure information; Music: New Beats 1 Radio support; New Quick Play button for Apple Music; Miscellaneous: You can now reply to emails right from your Watch using dictation, emoji, or smart replies; Support for FaceTime audio calls; Support for Wi-Fi calling; Activation Lock – No one can activate an Apple Watch without a proper Apple ID and password; New system languages: English (India), Finnish, Indonesian, Norwegian, Polish; Dictation support extended to include the following languages: Dutch (Belgium); English (Ireland, Philippines, South Africa); French (Belgium); German (Austria); Spanish (Chile, Colombia); Smart replies support extended to include the following languages: Traditional Chinese (Hong Kong, Taiwan); Danish; Dutch; English (New Zealand, Singapore); Japanese; Korean; Swedish; Thai; Developer: Native SDK support; 3rd-party apps can now access the accelerometer, heart rate sensor, microphone, Taptic Engine, and Digital Crown; You can now play videos directly on your Watch; You can now run apps without your iPhone with a Wi-Fi connection; Complications for watch faces support; Support for Workouts from 3rd party apps – Metrics will count toward the Activity rings as well as included in the Activity app on iPhone
2.0.1	9.1	13S428	October 21, 2015	New emoji; Bug fixes
2.1	9.2	13S661	December 8, 2015	New system languages: Arabic, Czech, Greek, Hebrew, Hungarian, Malay, Portuguese (Portugal), Vietnamese; Right-to-left language support; In Arabic, switch between Latin and Hindi numerals; New Complication for Islamic and Hebrew calendars; Siri support extended to include Arabic (Saudi Arabia, United Arab Emirates); Dictation support extended to include the following languages: Arabic (Saudi Arabia, United Arab Emirates); English (Malaysia); Czech; Greek; Hebrew; Hungarian; Portuguese (Portugal); Vietnamese; Bug fixes
2.2	9.3	13V144	March 21, 2016	You can now pair 2+ Apple Watches to a single iPhone; New Nearby function in Maps; New system languages: Catalan, Croatian, Slovak, Romanian, Ukrainian; Dictation support extended to include the following languages: Catalan; Croatian; Slovak; Romanian; Ukrainian; English (Saudi Arabia, UAE, and Indonesia); Siri support extended to include Malay, Finnish, and Hebrew; Background heart rate measurements have their frequency increased when you're stationary
2.2.1	9.3.2	13V420	May 16, 2016	General performance and stability improvements.
2.2.2	9.3.3	13V604	July 18, 2016	General performance and stability improvements.

=== watchOS 3 ===
Overview of watchOS 3 versions
watchOS version	iOS version based on	Build	Release date	Features
3.0	10.0	14S326	September 13, 2016	Initial Release on Apple Watch Series 1 (Dual-Core) and Apple Watch Series 2 (Dual-Core); Navigation: Favorite apps in Dock; Apps in Dock updates with up-to-date information on launch; Dock can contain up to 10 apps; Simple switch to different watch face with a swipe; Control Center can be toggled with a swipe up; New Watch faces: Minnie Mouse face; Activity faces; Numerals faces; Complications support for Photo, Photo Album, Timelapse, and Motion faces; New Complications: Workout, Music, and Messages, etc.; Face Gallery in Apple Watch app on iPhone; 3rd-party Complications support; Activity: Share and compare activity rings; Activity progress notifications for a person you have shared your activity progress with; Smart replies for above notifications; New "Sharing" tab on Activity app on iPhone; Workout: Quick start; Customizable metrics view; Gestures support for pausing, resuming, or marking segments; Support for "Other" workouts not listed in built-in workout types; Auto-pause in running workouts for inactivity; Siri support; Route maps with a speed indicator (Outdoor workouts only); For Wheelchairs: Activity rings support for people using a wheelchair; Pushes now contribute to the move ring; Stand ring and "Time to Stand" notification substituted with Roll ring and "Time to Roll" notification; Outdoor Run or Walk pace workouts; Breathe app: New app for breathing sessions; Visualization and haptics indicate when to inhale or exhale; Adjustments for session length and amount of breaths per minute; Summary with heart rate; "Time to Breathe" notifications; Weekly Summary; Communication: Full-screen effects for celebrations; Tap to quick reply; Animations for handwritten messages; Send built-in or 3rd party stickers; Ability to view secret messages; Replies now available in Messages and Mail notifications; New and redesigned emojis; Scribble: Write directly on Apple Watch and it will automatically convert to text; Scroll through predictions with Digital Crown; Available in English, Simplified Chinese, and Traditional Chinese; Emergency SOS: You can now call emergency services by pressing and holding the side button; Your SOS contacts will be notified with your location; You can also display your Medical ID stored on your Watch; Emergency numbers are automatically adjusted per your location; Home: New app to control accessories through HomeKit; You can now control all your accessories directly from your wrist; IP camera support: Watch live video with controls and notifications directly on your Watch; Miscellaneous: New Reminders app; New Find My Friends app; Apple Pay support in 3rd-party apps; New controls in the Calendar app: You can now delete events or switch calendars; FaceTime audio calls support; Search for Settings on Apple Watch app on iPhone; New remote camera controls: Flash, Live Photos, HDR, Zoom, Burst, and facing; New Siri languages: Spanish (Chile), Cantonese, English (Ireland), English (South Africa)
3.1	10.1	14S471	October 24, 2016	Bubbles and fullscreen effects on Messages can now be replayed; Reduce Motion of Messages effects; Bug fixes
3.1.1	10.2	14S883	December 12, 2016	Update withdrawn due to reports of Apple Watches no longer working after the update
3.1.3	10.2.1	14S960	January 23, 2017	Includes fixes from watchOS 3.1.1
3.2	10.3	14V249	March 27, 2017	Siri now works with 3rd-party apps with features including; Start a workout; Send messages; Make payments; Book rides; Theater Mode; New Scribble languages: French, Spanish, Italian; Sync progress for music playlists is now displayed in the Apple Watch app on iPhone
3.2.2	10.3.2	14V485	May 15, 2017	Bug fixes.
3.2.3	10.3.3	14V753	July 19, 2017	Bug fixes.; Final version to support iPhone 5 and iPhone 5C

=== watchOS 4 ===
Overview of watchOS 4 versions
watchOS version	iOS version based on	Build	Release date	Features
4.0	11.0	15R372	September 19, 2017	Initial release on Apple Watch Series 3 Drops support for iPhone 5 and iPhone 5C New Watch faces: Siri face with updates based on time, location, and daily routines; Toy Story face with animated Toy Story characters; Kaleidoscope face with static images turning into patterns; Siri, News, Heart Rate, Now Playing, Messages Complications; Activity: Personalized notifications; Monthly challenges; Full Screen animations for achievements and rings closed; Workout metrics included in replies for Activity Sharing notifications; Workout: App completely redesigned; High Intensity Interval Training workout support; Multiple workouts in a single session support; Auto sets for Pool Swim workouts; Synced music playlist support when starting workouts (Apple Watch 1st gen not supported); Music controls right inside the app; Do Not Disturb can be automatically turned on when starting workouts; Heart Rate: Graphs for all-day heart rate; New measurements including resting rate, walking average, workout average, workout high, recovery, and Breathe sessions; High Heart Rate notifications support (Apple Watch 1st gen not supported); New Heart Rate data on iPhone including Heart Rate Variability and VO_{2} max.; Music: App completely redesigned; Multiple playlists sync support for local playback with Bluetooth headphones; Apple Music curated playlists sync support, includes Heavy Rotation, My New Music Mix, and My Favorites Mix; Miscellaneous: News app added; Flashlight and Safety Light can be toggled through Control Center; Recent used apps in Dock; App home screen in alphabetical view; Gestures support in Mail; Dialer pad right inside Phone app; Conflicts for Calendar invites can now be displayed; New language for Scribble: German; New timers: sub-minute and repeating; Recent locations and suggestions in Maps; Contacts in Smart Reply, includes location
4.0.1	11.0	15R654	October 4, 2017	Apple Watch Series 3 (GPS + Cellular) only: Bug fixes
4.1	11.1	15R846	October 31, 2017	Music streaming support on Apple Music or iCloud Music Library (Apple Watch Series 3 only); New Radio app: Beats 1 Live Radio, custom stations, and expert-curated stations (Apple Watch Series 3 only); Find, discover, and play songs, albums, or albums using Siri; Fitness data syncing support for more accurate metrics on GymKit-enabled treadmills, ellipticals, stair steppers, and indoor bikes; Ability to disconnect from a Wi-Fi network right in Control Center (Apple Watch Series 3 GPS + Cellular model only); Mandarin Chinese now set as default dictation language in China; Bug fixes
4.2	11.2	15S102	December 5, 2017	Apple Pay Cash support (US only); HomeKit sprinklers and faucet support; 3rd-party app Workouts: distance, average Speed, number of runs, elevation descended for downhill snow sports (Apple Watch Series 3 only); Bug fixes
4.2.2	11.2	15S542	January 23, 2018	This update includes improvements and bug fixes.
4.2.3	11.2	15S600b	February 19, 2018	Fixes an issue where using certain character sequences could cause apps to crash.
4.3	11.3	15T212	March 29, 2018	HomePod volume and playback control support; Regaining control of music on iPhone; Multiple orientation support on Nightstand mode; Activity rings progress and new songs to Apple Music mixes are now shown on the Siri watch face; Bug fixes
4.3.1	11.4	15T567	May 29, 2018	Fixes an issue which caused Apple Watch to sometimes remain at the Apple Logo during startup for some users.
4.3.2	11.4.1	15U70	July 9, 2018	Final release supported on Apple Watch (1st generation): This update includes improvements and bug fixes.

=== watchOS 5 ===
watchOS 5 was first shown to the public at the 2018 San Jose WWDC developer conference held on June 4, 2018, by Apple. It had an instant watch-to-watch Walkie-Talkie mode. watchOS 5 was the first version of watchOS to bring 64-bit support.

watchOS 5 dropped support for the 1st-generation Apple Watch.

Overview of watchOS 5 versions
watchOS version	iOS version based on	Build	Release date	Features
5.0	12.0	16R364	September 17, 2018	Initial Release on Apple Watch Series 4 Drops support for the Apple Watch (1st generation): Workout; Compete with Friends notifications; Auto detect workout and notification to turn off workout when done; New workouts: Yoga and Hiking; Pace Alerts and Cadence; Podcasts; New app for watchOS; Download episodes of podcasts for listening; Stream your favorite podcasts on the go (Series 3 and later only); Walkie-Talkie; A new watchOS app that allows you to do FaceTime Audio calls similar to talking on a walkie-talkie; Siri; Watchface adds 3rd-party access to Siri; Raise to Speak. No longer need to say "Hey Siri" to activate (Series 3 and later only); Integrate with shortcuts like "I am on my way home" and Siri will start playing your favorite playlist on the way home; Notifications; Grouped notifications; More actions you can do with Notifications; Can view webpages from iMessages; Do Not Disturb; Can schedule Do Not Disturb events when leaving a location or just for a specific time period; Student ID Cards
5.0.1	12.0	16R381/16R382	September 27, 2018	Improvements and bug fixes
5.1	12.1	16R591	October 30, 2018	Update withdrawn due to reports of Apple Watches no longer working after the update
5.1.1	12.1	16R600	November 5, 2018	Improvements and bug fixes: Addresses a problem in the WatchOS 5.1 update leading to non-functional Apple Watches.; Improvements to Series 4 automatic fall detection.; Resolves a problem with completing setup of Walkie-Talkie.; Resolves a problem with sending and receiving invitations for Walkie-Talkie.; Resolves missing earned Activity awards.
5.1.2	12.1.1	16S46	December 6, 2018	New ECG app for Apple Watch Series 4 (US and US territories only); Irregular rhythm notification (US and US territories only); AFiB notification; Other improvements and bug fixes
5.1.3	12.1.3	16S535	January 22, 2019	This update includes improvements and bug fixes.
5.2	12.2	16T225	March 27, 2019	ECG app extended to Austria, Belgium, Denmark, Finland, France, Germany, Greece, Hong Kong, Hungary, Ireland, Italy, Luxembourg, Netherlands, Norway, Portugal, Romania, Spain, Sweden, Switzerland, and the UK; Irregular rhythm notification extended to countries listed above; 2nd gen AirPods support; Real-time text support for phone calls
5.2.1	12.3	16U113	May 13, 2019	ECG app extended to Croatia, Czechia, Iceland, Poland, and Slovakia; Irregular rhythm notification extended to countries listed above; New Pride watch face; Other bug fixes
5.3	12.4	16U569	July 22, 2019	ECG app extended to Canada and Singapore; Irregular rhythm notification extended to countries listed above; Security fix for Walkie-Talkie app that could enable the owner's iPhone to be eavesdropped
5.3.1	12.4.1	16U600	August 26, 2019	Re-patches a security vulnerability that was accidentally unpatched in the previous update
Post-watchOS 5 Updates for watches paired with an iOS 12.x iPhone (to support iPhone 5S and iPhone 6/6 Plus)
5.3.2	12.4.2	16U611	September 26, 2019	Apple Watch Series 1 and Apple Watch Series 2 only: Security update for Series 1 and Series 2 watches
5.3.3	12.4.3	16U620	October 29, 2019	Apple Watch Series 1 and Apple Watch Series 2 only: Important security updates
5.3.4	12.4.4	16U627	December 10, 2019	Security update for Series 1, 2, 3, and 4 watches
5.3.5	12.4.5	16U652	February 18, 2020	Update for Series 1, 2, 3, and 4 watches with heart rhythm notification bug fix; No published security notes.
5.3.6	12.4.6	16U662	March 24, 2020	Important security updates; No published security notes.
5.3.7	12.4.7	16U674	May 18, 2020	Improvements and bug fixes; Security notes
5.3.8	12.4.8	16U680	July 15, 2020	Improvements and bug fixes; No published security notes.
5.3.9	12.4.9	16U693	November 5, 2020	Improvements and bug fixes; Security notes
5.3.10	12.5.8	16U711	March 24, 2026	Final version to support iPhone 5S, iPhone 6, iPhone 6 Plus: Extends device certificate required by iMessage, FaceTime, and device activation to continue working past January 2027

=== watchOS 6 ===
Apple announced a new version of watchOS that would contain features such as the App Store, a calculator with tip tools, an audiobooks app, noise level monitoring, and Apple's Voice Memos app, at WWDC 2019 held on June 3, 2019. It also enables special games that can only be played on the Watch interface. With this release, Apple dropped support for iPhone 5s, 6, and 6 Plus. However, watchOS 6 has limited support on Apple Watch Series 1 and 2. watchOS 6.3 is the final release supported on the Apple Watch Series 1 and 2.

Overview of watchOS 6 versions
watchOS version	iOS version based on	Build	Release date	Features
6.0	13.0	17R575	September 19, 2019	Initial Release on Apple Watch Series 5 Not released for Apple Watch Series 1 and 2 Drops support for iPhone 5s, iPhone 6 and iPhone 6 Plus: Cycle Tracking; New Cycle Tracking app for tracking menstrual cycle and fertility metrics; Notifications predicting a person's next menstrual cycle and fertile window.; Noise (Series 4 or later only); New Noise app for detecting decibel levels in your surroundings.; Notifications can be pushed when it detects that the noise in your surrounding is too high.; Voice Memos; New Voice Memos app for recording and listening to voice memos directly on Apple Watch; Synced across all your devices as well.; Audiobooks; Now you can sync up to 5 hours of audiobooks to your Apple Watch; Stream them when your Watch is connected via Wi-Fi or cellular; App store; New built-in App Store where you can find and download apps for your Watch.; Supports Sign in with Apple; Activity Trends; Activity Trends in Activity app which includes all three activity rings, stand minutes, walking distance, walking pace, running pace, and VO_{2} max.; These are compared with data averaged over the last 90 days to the wearer's performance over the last year.; Tips are given if a single trend is going down.; Workout; New elevation metrics for Outdoor Run, Outdoor Walk, Outdoor Cycle, and Hiking workouts (Series 2 or later only); Stopwatch app can now be viewed on your watch face during workouts; GymKit support for True and Woodway; Siri; Now you can identify songs directly on your Watch—with the ability to add identified songs to your Apple Music library; New Siri Web Search—shows up to 5 online results with the ability to view optimized Web content.; Siri integration into the redesigned Find People app; Watch Faces; New Faces; Numerals Mono and Numerals Duo (Available in Arabic, Arabic Indic, Roman numerals, and Devanagari); Meridian—black or white dial which fills the screen and includes 4 complications (Series 4 or later only); Gradient—Design dynamically changes as time passes. Available in full screen or circular with 5 complications (Series 4 or later only); California—Supports multiple numeral styles in Roman, Arabic, and Devanagari in fullscreen or circular (Series 4 or later only); Solar Dial—Depicts the Sun's path in circular form across a 24-hour dial (Series 4 or later only); Modular Compact—With many complications and the option to choose between analog or digital time (Series 4 or later only); Tap to speak on all watch faces, supports up to 30 languages; Receive and customize time-keeping chimes (An alert on the hour, every half hour or every 15 minutes, either with haptics or customizable chimes); Now you can reorder your Watch faces directly on your Watch; New complications; Audiobooks; Calculator; Cellular connectivity; Cycle Tracking; Noise; Wind; Rain; Voice memos; New monochrome complications for Infograph and Infograph Modular faces; Miscellaneous; New Calculator app with the ability to calculate tips and split checks; Support for custom stations in the Podcasts app; Smart Guidance and spoken navigation in Maps; Redesigned Now Playing app with Apple TV Remote controls; Personalized music picks in the For You tab; Support for automatic software updates; Redesigned Walkie-Talkie app; Redesigned Find People app which allows you to add friends, set notifications, and change settings directly on your Watch; Redesigned Reminders app with shared lists, subtasks, and the ability to add new reminders; More settings for Accessibility, Workout, and Health
6.0.1	13.1	17R604/17R605	September 30, 2019	Not released for Apple Watch Series 1 and 2 Improvements and bug fixes: Resolves an issue where the Mickey Mouse and Minnie Mouse watch faces do not speak time.; Addresses an issue where the calendar complication may not display events.; Fixes a bug that could result in a loss of display calibration data.
6.1	13.2	17S84	October 29, 2019	First version of watchOS 6.x to support Apple Watch Series 1 and 2: Support for AirPods Pro; Other improvements and bug fixes; Brings watchOS 6 to Apple Watch Series 1 and Series 2
6.1.1	13.3	17S449	December 10, 2019	Important security updates
6.1.2	13.3.1	17S796	January 28, 2020	Important security updates; Security notes
6.1.3		17S811	February 18, 2020	Heart rhythm notification bug fix; No published security notes.
6.2	13.4	17T529	March 24, 2020	Brings ECG app and irregular heart rhythm notifications to Chile, Turkey, and New Zealand; Brings in-app purchases to Apple Watch apps; Fixes music playback issues when switching from Wi-Fi to Bluetooth; Security notes
6.2.1	13.4.1	17T530	April 8, 2020	Fixes an issue that prevented FaceTime audio calls with devices running iOS 9.3.6 and earlier or Macs running OS X El Captain 10.11.6 and earlier from working; No published security notes.
6.2.5	13.5	17T608	May 18, 2020	ECG app on Apple Watch Series 4 or later now available in Saudi Arabia; Irregular heart rhythm notifications now available in Saudi Arabia; Security notes
6.2.6	13.5.1	17T620	June 1, 2020	Important security updates; Security notes
6.2.8	13.6	17U63	July 15, 2020	ECG app on Apple Watch Series 4 or later now available in Bahrain, Brazil, and South Africa; Irregular heart rhythm notifications now available in Bahrain, Brazil, and South Africa; Digital car keys support for Apple Watch Series 5; Security notes
6.2.8	13.6.1	17U63	August 12, 2020	ECG app on Apple Watch Series 4 or later now available in Bahrain, Brazil, and South Africa; Irregular heart rhythm notifications now available in Bahrain, Brazil, and South Africa; Digital car keys support for Apple Watch Series 5; Security notes
6.2.8	13.7	17U63	September 1, 2020	ECG app on Apple Watch Series 4 or later now available in Bahrain, Brazil, and South Africa; Irregular heart rhythm notifications now available in Bahrain, Brazil, and South Africa; Digital car keys support for Apple Watch Series 5; Security notes
Post-watchOS 7 Updates for watches paired with an iOS 13.x iPhone (for users who deferred updating to iOS 14)
6.2.9	13.7	17U203	November 5, 2020	Apple Watch Series 1 and Apple Watch Series 2 only: Improvements and bug fixes; Security notes
6.3	13.7	17U208	December 14, 2020	Improvements and bug fixes; Security notes
6.3.1	13.7	17U224	February 2, 2026	Final version to support the Apple Watch Series 1 and 2: Extends device certificate required by iMessage, FaceTime, and device activation to continue working past January 2027

=== watchOS 7 ===
Apple announced watchOS 7 at the 2020 Worldwide Developers Conference on June 22, 2020. With watchOS 7, Apple dropped support for Apple Watch Series 1 and 2. watchOS 7 has limited support on the Apple Watch Series 3.

watchOS 7 dropped support for the Apple Watch Series 1 and 2.

Overview of watchOS 7 versions
watchOS version	iOS version based on	Build	Release date	Features
7.0	iOS 14.0	18R382	September 16, 2020	Initial Release on Apple Watch SE and Apple Watch Series 6 Drops support for the Apple Watch Series 1 and Apple Watch Series 2: Watch Faces; Updated Faces; Chronograph Pro gains a tachymeter (Series 4 or later only); X-Large adds support for one large complication; Photos face provides colour filters for pictures and more customization options; Updated colours for many watch faces; Complications; Apps may now include more than one complication; New and/or updated Sleep, Shortcuts, Camera Remote, Moon Phase and World Clock complications; Watch Face Sharing; Ability to share custom Watch Faces through Mail, Messages, or posting a link; Sleep Tracking; Apple Watch uses the accelerometer to measure sleep; See logged sleep, manage schedules and set alarms in the new Sleep app; New alarm sounds and haptics; Wind Down mode; Sleep Mode automatically enables Do Not Disturb and disables Raise to Wake; Reminders to charge your Apple Watch in the evening if below 30% charge; Notifications on iPhone when Apple Watch is finished charging; Wake up screen displays after your alarm, showing the weather and your battery level; Activity; Workouts; New Dance, Functional Strength Training, Core Training and Cooldown workouts; Mobility Metrics; Support for low-range cardio fitness, walking speed, stair-descent speed, stair-ascent speed, six-minute walk distance, double support time, step length, and asymmetry metrics in the Health app on iPhone, tracked by Apple Watch; Exercise and Stand goals can now be modified in addition to the Move goal; Activity app renamed Fitness app on iPhone; Maps; Cycling Directions; Cycling specific directions in Maps in supported areas; Choose routes based on intensity and duration; Alerts about upcoming stairs and dismount locations; Handwashing (Series 4 or later only) due to COVID-19; Automatic handwashing detection with a 20-second timer; Handwashing reminder when arriving home; Siri; Translation support for 10 languages; Support for Announce Messages with Siri; New Siri UI; New Apps; New Shortcuts app, and ability to choose visible shortcuts on Apple Watch from iPhone; New Memoji app with support for editing and creating new Memoji (Series 4 or later only); Dictation; Dictation is processed on-device (Series 4 or later only); Privacy; Microphone icon appears onscreen when in use; Headphones; Ability to set a decibel volume limit for headphones; Reminders to reduce volume if above World Health Organization's limits; Family Setup (Cellular Series 4 or later only, in supported countries); Pair Apple Watches for family members that do not have their own iPhone, aimed at children and seniors; Activity metrics are more accurate for children, and Apple Watch now measures move minutes rather than active calories; Apple Cash Family allows children to receive money using Apple Cash; Enhanced parental controls, including approved contacts and apps, and Schooltime; Schooltime; Displays a standard yellow watch face and turns on Do Not Disturb to limit distractions; Can be manually enabled through the Control Centre, or scheduled and remotely enabled for child watches using Family Setup; Security notes
7.0.1	iOS 14.0.1	18R395	September 24, 2020	Fixes an issue where some payment cards in Wallet were disabled for some users; No published security notes.
7.0.2		18R402	October 12, 2020	Fixes an issue where the battery drained too quickly; Fixes an issue that blocked access to the ECG app; No published security notes.
7.0.3		18R410	October 19, 2020	Fixes an issue that causes unexpected restarts with Series 3 watches; No published security notes.
7.1	iOS 14.2	18R590	November 5, 2020	Headphone audio level notifications; Adds ECG and irregular heart rhythm notifications support in South Korea and Russia; Fixed: Unlocking Mac with Apple Watch fails; Fixed: Always-on display failure on Apple Watch Series 6; Security notes
7.2		18S564	December 14, 2020	Adds support for Apple Fitness+ (Australia, Canada, Ireland, New Zealand, UK, and US only); Cardio fitness notifications; AFiB notifications now available at heart rates above 100 BPM; Adds ECG support in Taiwan; Adds braille displays with VoiceOver support; Family Setup now available in Bahrain, Canada, Norway, and Spain; Security notes
7.3		18S801	January 26, 2021	New Unity watch face; New Time to Walk podcasts in Apple Fitness+; Add ECG support in Japan, Mayotte, Philippines, Taiwan, and Thailand (Series 4 or later); Add Irregular heart rhythm notifications in Japan, Mayotte, Philippines, Taiwan, and Thailand; Fix an unresponsive issue when zoom is enabled in the Control Center and Notification Center; Security notes
7.3.1		18S811	February 15, 2021	Fix for a charging issue when in Power Reserve mode (Series 5 and SE only); No published security notes.
7.3.2		18S821	March 8, 2021	Important security updates; Security notes
7.3.3		18S830	March 26, 2021	Important security updates; Security notes
7.4	iOS 14.5	18T195	April 26, 2021	Unlock iPhone with Face ID using Apple Watch when wearing a face mask; Set the Bluetooth device type in Settings; Airplay audio and video content of Apple Fitness+ workouts; Add ECG support on in Australia and Vietnam (Series 4 or later); Add irregular heart rhythm notifications in Australia and Vietnam; Security notes
7.4.1	iOS 14.5.1	18T201	May 3, 2021	Important security updates; Security notes
7.5	iOS 14.6	18T567	May 24, 2021	Subscription content in Podcasts app; Apple Card with a Family Sharing; Add ECG support in Malaysia and Peru (Series 4 or later); Add irregular heart rhythm notifications in Malaysia and Peru; Security notes
7.6	iOS 14.7	18U63	July 19, 2021	Add ECG support for multiple countries (Series 4 or later); Add irregular heart rhythm notifications for multiple countries; Security notes
7.6.1	iOS 14.7.1	18U70	July 29, 2021	Important security updates; Security notes
7.6.2	iOS 14.8	18U80	September 13, 2021	This release fixes FORCEDENTRY (CVE-2021-30860), an integer overflow bug that allows a malicious PDF to perform remote code execution.; Security notes

=== watchOS 8 ===
Apple announced watchOS 8 at the 2021 Worldwide Developers Conference on June 7, 2021. Apple Watch models supporting watchOS 7 can also support watchOS 8. However, like watchOS 7, watchOS 8 has limited support on Apple Watch Series 3. It is also the last version of watchOS to be supported on Apple Watch models with 32-bit processors.

Overview of watchOS 8 versions
watchOS version	iOS version based on	Build	Release date	Features
8.0	15.0	19R343 19R346	September 20, 2021	Initial release on Apple Watch Series 7. Build 13R346 is pre-installed only on Apple Watch Series 7 (GPS + Cellular).: Watch Faces; New Portrait photo and World Time watch face (Series 4 and later); Home; View the status and accessory controls at the top; Accessories and scenes displayed changes depending on the time of day and usage; View all HomeKit camera feeds together; New Favorites section; Wallet; Added support for home, hotel, and office keys; Added support for car keys (Series 6 and later); Added support for Remote keyless car features; Workout; New tai chi and pilates workouts; Automatic workout detection for outdoor cycling; Outdoor cycling workout tracking improvements; Hiking workout tracking improvements (aged 13 and below); Voice feedback during workout; Fitness+; New guided meditations sessions; New pilates workouts; New picture-in-picture support; New search filters; Mindfulness; Breathe session improvements; New reflect session; Sleep; Monitor respiratory rate when sleeping; View respiratory rate data recorded in Health app; Messages; Use the Scribble, dictation, and emoji methods simultaneously; Use Digital Crown to scroll when editing dictated text; Enter hashtag to search for GIF images; Photos; New Photos app; Share photos; Find My; New Find Items app; New Find Devices app; Weather; Support for precipitation and severe weather notifications alerts; New precipitation graph; Miscellaneous; Focus function added; Sync Focus state with iOS, iPadOS or macOS; New Contacts app; New Tips app; Redesigned Music app; Share songs, albums, and playlists; Run simultaneous timers at the same time; Cycle Tracking improvements; New Memoji stickers and outfits; Measure headphone audio level in Control Center; Transit card support in Wallet for Family Setup users in multiple countries; Google account support in Calendar and Mail for Family Setup users; New AssistiveTouch gestures supported; Add ECG support in Lithuania (Series 4 or later); Add irregular heart rhythm notifications in Lithuania; Security notes
8.0.1	15.0.2	19R354	October 11, 2021	Software update progress bar fix (Series 3 only); Fix a bug with Accessibility settings (Series 3 only); No published security notes.
8.1	15.1	19R570	October 25, 2021	Fall detection improvements and new settings (Series 4 and later); Support COVID-19 vaccination cards in Apple Wallet; Fitness+ SharePlay support; Improve Always-On time accuracy (Series 5 and later); Security notes
8.1.1		19R580	November 18, 2021	Apple Watch Series 7 (GPS + Cellular) only: Charging issue fix; No published security notes.
8.3	15.2	19S55	December 13, 2021	Enable ECG for China (Series 4 or later); Compass no longer shows altitude (Series 3–5) latitude and longitude in mainland China; New Apple Music Voice plan option; New App Privacy Report; Fix for notifications not being muted during Mindfulness sessions; Security notes
8.4	15.3	19S546	January 26, 2022	Important security updates; Charging fix for select chargers; Security notes
8.4.1		19S550	February 1, 2022	Apple Watch Series 4 or later only: Bug fixes; No published security notes.
8.4.2	15.3.1	19S553	February 10, 2022	Important security updates; Bug fixes; No published security notes.
8.5	15.4	19T242	March 14, 2022	Authenticate Apple TV purchases and subscriptions; Support for EU COVID-19 vaccination cards in Apple Wallet; Afib tracking improvements for irregular rhythm notifications in multiple countries; New audio description in Fitness+; Security notes
8.5.1	15.4.1	19T252	March 31, 2022	Important security updates; Bug fixes; No published security notes.
8.6	15.5	19T572	May 16, 2022	Add ECG support in Mexico (Series 4 or later); Add irregular heart rhythm notifications in Mexico; Security notes
8.7	15.6	19U66	July 20, 2022	Important security updates; Bug fixes; Security notes
8.7.1	15.6.1	19U67	August 17, 2022	Apple Watch Series 3 only: Restart issue fix; No published security notes.
Post-watchOS 9 update for Series 3 and/or watches paired with an iOS 15.x iPhone (to support iPhone 6S, 6S Plus, SE (1st gen), 7 and 7 Plus)
8.8.1	15.7.7	19U512	June 21, 2023	Security notes
8.8.2	15.8.7	19U526	March 24, 2026	Final version to support the Apple Watch Series 3, iPhone 6S, 6S Plus, SE (1st gen), 7, and 7 Plus: Extends device certificate required by iMessage, FaceTime, and device activation to continue working past January 2027

=== watchOS 9 ===
Apple announced watchOS 9 at the 2022 Worldwide Developers Conference on June 6, 2022. With this release, Apple dropped support for the Apple Watch Series 3, which was the last Apple Watch model with a 32-bit processor, making watchOS 9 the first version of watchOS to run exclusively on Apple Watch models with 64-bit processors.

Overview of watchOS 9 versions
watchOS version	iOS version based on	Build	Release date	Features
9.0	16.0	20R361	September 12, 2022	Initial release on Apple Watch Series 8, Apple Watch SE (2nd gen) and Apple Watch Ultra Drops support for the Apple Watch Series 3, iPhone 6S, 6S Plus, SE (1st gen), 7 and 7 Plus: Watch Faces; New Astronomy, Lunar, Playtime, Metropolitan, and Nike watch faces; Complication improvements; Portrait photo watch face improvements; Change watch face depending on Focus; Workout; Access workout view during a workout; New heart rate zone, elevation view, and running power graphs; Additional running metrics (SE, Series 6 and later); New custom and Multisport workout option; New workout alerts; Pool Swim workout improvements; New swimming metrics; Fitness+; New trainer guidance and personal fitness metrics displayed; Compass; New Compass app (SE, Series 5 and later); New compass waypoints, and backtrack GPS function (SE, Series 6 and later); Sleep; Sleep tracking improvements; New comparisons chart; Medications; Add and schedule medications; View medication schedule; Medication reminders; New watch complication; AFib History; New weekly summary notifications; AFib tracking improvements; Export data as a PDF; Family Setup; New Podcasts app; New support for Yahoo and Outlook emails; Accessibility; New AssistiveTouch actions; Ability to pair a Bluetooth keyboard; Airplay Apple Watch to iPhone; Miscellaneous; New Low Power Mode; International roaming support (SE, Series 5 and later); New keyboard languages (Series 7 and later); New Communication safety setting in Screen Time; New cycle deviation notifications alerts; New cardio recovery metrics; Reminders, Calendar, and Podcast app improvements; Minor Dock enhancements; New notification banner design when in use; Security notes
9.0.1		20R8380	September 22, 2022	Apple Watch Ultra only: Fixes an issue with audio on phone calls on the Apple Watch Ultra; No published security notes.
9.0.2		20R8383	October 10, 2022	Fixes an issue causing interruptions with Spotify; Fixes an issue with snooze alarm notifications continuing after deleting the alarm; Fixes syncing of Wallet and Fitness data for newly paired watch; Fixes an issue with audio interruptions on Series 8 and Ultra; No published security notes.
9.1	16.1	20S75	October 24, 2022	Option to extend battery life during select workouts by reducing heart rate and GPS reading frequency (Series 8, SE 2nd generation, and Ultra); Download music while on battery via Wi-Fi or cellular; Add support for Matter; Fixes incorrect voice feedback of average pace for the Outdoor Run workout; Fixes an issue where the chance of rain probability shown in Weather app may be different from iPhone; Fixes an issue with the hourly weather complication showing AM for PM hours; Fixes an issue with time duration getting stuck during Strength Training Workout; Fixes an issue where VoiceOver fails to announce the app name when multiple notifications are received; Security notes
9.2	16.2	20S361	December 13, 2022	Security notes
9.3	16.3	20S648	January 23, 2023	Security notes
9.3.1	16.3.1	20S664	February 13, 2023	
9.4	16.4	20T253	March 27, 2023	Wake-up alarms are no longer silenced with cover to mute gesture to avoid accidental cancellations during sleep; Cycle Tracking with retrospective ovulation estimates and cycle deviation alerts now supported in Moldova and Ukraine; AFib History now available in Colombia, Malaysia, Moldova, Thailand, and Ukraine; Security notes
9.5	16.5	20T562	May 18, 2023	Add Pride Celebration watch face to honor the LGBTQ+ community and culture; Security notes
9.5.1		20T570	May 30, 2023	
9.5.2		20T571	June 21, 2023	Security notes
9.6	16.6	20U73	July 24, 2023	
9.6.1		20U80	August 15, 2023	
9.6.2	16.6.1	20U90	September 7, 2023	Security notes
Post-watchOS 10 update for watches paired with an iOS 16.x iPhone (to support phones that iOS 17 does not support like iPhone 8, iPhone 8 Plus, iPhone X)
9.6.3		20U502	September 21, 2023	Security notes
9.6.4	16.7.14	20U512	February 2, 2026	Final version to support iPhone 8, 8 Plus and X: Extends device certificate required by iMessage, FaceTime, and device activation to continue working past January 2027

=== watchOS 10 ===
Apple announced watchOS 10 at the 2023 Worldwide Developers Conference on June 5, 2023. With this release, Apple dropped support for iPhone 8, 8 Plus and X. All Apple Watch models supporting watchOS 9 also support watchOS 10.

Overview of watchOS 10 versions
watchOS version	iOS version based on	Build	Release date	Features
10.0	17.0	21R356	September 18, 2023	Initial release on Apple Watch Series 9 and Apple Watch Ultra 2: New Watch Faces: Snoopy, Palette, Nike Globe, and Solar Analog; Optimized Charge Limit is now available on Apple Watch SE, Series 6, Series 7, and Series 8.; Fixed: Apple Watch Series 6 (40mm) estimates maximum battery capacity more accurately.; New and updated ways to use Apple Watch
10.0.1	17.0.1	21R360	September 21, 2023	Bug fixes
10.0.2	17.0.2	21R371	September 26, 2023	Ultra 2 and Series 9 only: Bug fixes that are specific to the Ultra 2 and Series 9
10.1	17.1	21S67	October 25, 2023	Double Tap gesture (select models); NameDrop (select models); Bug fixes
10.1.1	17.1.1	21S71	November 7, 2023	Battery drain fixes
10.2	17.2	21S364	December 11, 2023	
10.3	17.3	21S644	January 22, 2024	New Watch Faces: Unity Bloom
10.3.1	17.3.1	21S651	February 8, 2024	
10.4	17.4	21T216	March 7, 2024	
10.5	17.5	21T575	May 13, 2024	New Watch Faces: Pride Radiance; Bug fixes
10.6	17.6	21U577	July 29, 2024	Bug fixes and security improvements
10.6.1	17.6.1	21U580	August 19, 2024	This update fixes an issue that may prevent access to Apple Fitness+
Post-watchOS 11 update for Series 4, Series 5, and SE (1st generation), paired with an iPhone on iOS 17.x or later
10.6.2	17.7.2	21U594	February 2, 2026	Final version to support the Apple Watch Series 4, Apple Watch Series 5 and Apple Watch SE (1st generation): Extends device certificate required by iMessage, FaceTime, and device activation to continue working past January 2027

=== watchOS 11 ===
Apple announced watchOS 11 at the 2024 Worldwide Developers Conference on June 10, 2024. With this release, Apple drops support for the Apple Watch Series 4, Apple Watch Series 5 and Apple Watch SE (1st generation). This marks the first time 64-bit Apple Watch devices were dropped.

For legal reasons, blood oxygen monitoring was disabled on Series 9 and Ultra 2 Apple Watches sold in the United States after January 18, 2024. Apple Watch Series 10 was also incapable of blood oxygen monitoring at release. On August 14, 2025, Apple reintroduced blood oxygen monitoring for affected Series 9, Series 10, and Ultra 2 Apple Watches with watchOS 11.6.1.

Overview of watchOS 11 versions
watchOS version	iOS version based on	Build	Release date	Features
11.0	18.0	22R349	September 16, 2024	Initial release on Apple Watch Series 10 Drops support for the Apple Watch Series 4, Apple Watch Series 5 and Apple Watch SE (1st generation).
11.0.1	18.0.1	22R361	October 3, 2024	
11.1	18.1	22R585	October 28, 2024	
11.2	18.2	22S101	December 11, 2024	
11.3	18.3	22S555	January 27, 2025	Bug fixes
11.3.1	18.3.1	22S560	February 10, 2025	Bug fixes
11.4	18.4	22T251	March 31, 2025	
11.5	18.5	22T572	May 12, 2025	
11.6	18.6	22U84	July 29, 2025	Bug fixes
11.6.1	18.6.1	22U90	August 14, 2025	
Post-watchOS 26 update for watches paired with an iOS 18.x iPhone (to support iPhone XS, XS Max, and XR)
11.6.2	18.7.4	22U95	February 5, 2026	Final version to support the iPhone XS, XS Max, and XR: Fixed an issue with connecting to emergency services in Australia

=== watchOS 26 ===
Apple announced watchOS 26 at the 2025 Worldwide Developers Conference on June 9, 2025. watchOS 26 was released on September 15, 2025. All devices that supported watchOS 11 support watchOS 26.

It is the last version of watchOS to support the Apple Watch Series 6, Apple Watch Series 7, Apple Watch Series 8, Apple Watch Ultra (1st generation), and Apple Watch SE (2nd generation). It is also the last version of watchOS to be supported on Apple Watch models with arm64_32 processors.

Apple advanced the version number to 26 as part of a shift to a year-based versioning convention across its operating systems.

Overview of watchOS 26 versions
Version	Build	Release date	Features
26.0	23R352	September 15, 2025	Initial release on Apple Watch Series 11, Apple Watch SE (3rd generation), and Apple Watch Ultra 3 Drops support for iPhone XS, XS Max, and XR: New Watch faces: Exactograph, Flow, Waypoint, Hermès Faubourg Party, alongside enhancements to Photos face and a redesigned watch face gallery.; New unified Liquid Glass design language, which is used across Apple platforms; Hypertension Notifications for (Series 9, Ultra 2 or later); Sleep Score; Workout Buddy (requires Apple Intelligence-capable iPhone); Improved prediction algorithm for Smart Stack; Configurable widgets in Smart Stack; Live Translation for Messages (Series 9. Ultra 2 or later with Apple Intelligence-capable iPhone); Smart Actions and more precise Smart Replies in Messages; Redesigned Workout app with intelligent media controls, now allowing Apple Music to select the best workout playlist; New Notes app; Wrist Flick gesture (Series 9, Ultra 2 or later); Several watch faces and applications like Stopwatch and Timer get 1 Hz support that shows seconds ticking in always-on mode (Series 10 or later); Automatic adjustment of volume of notifications, calls, timers, alarms, and Siri based on the environment; Hold Assist and Call Screening when iPhone is nearby; Security notes
26.0.1	23R8352	September 18, 2025	Ultra 3 only: Enables Messages and Find My via satellite in Mexico; No security notes
26.0.2	23R362	September 29, 2025	Bug fixes; No security notes
26.1	23S37	November 3, 2025	Security notes
26.2	23S303	December 12, 2025	Sleep Score notification controls and classification refinements; Enhanced Safety Alerts in the United States; Fixes bug in Music app where songs do not advance; Security notes
26.2.1	23S314	January 26, 2026	Adds support for AirTag 2; No security notes
26.3	23S620	February 11, 2026	Security notes
26.4	23T240	March 24, 2026	Adds support for AirPods Max 2; Workout type icon in Workout app; New emoji based on Unicode 17.0; Security notes
26.5	23T570	May 11, 2026	Security notes
26.6	23U67	July 27, 2026	Security notes
Post-watchOS 27 update for Series 6, Series 7, Series 8, Ultra (1st generation), and SE (2nd generation), paired with an iPhone on iOS 26.x or later
26.6.1	23U95	November 9, 2026	Final version to support the Apple Watch Series 6, Apple Watch Series 7, Apple Watch Series 8, Apple Watch Ultra (1st generation), and Apple Watch SE (2nd generation). Security notes
Legend: Unsupported Supported Latest version Preview version

=== watchOS 27 ===
Apple announced watchOS 27 at the 2026 Worldwide Developers Conference on June 8, 2026. watchOS 27 was released on September 14, 2026.

With this release, Apple dropped support for the Apple Watch Series 6, Series 7, Series 8, Ultra (1st generation), and SE (2nd generation), the last Apple Watch models with an arm64_32 processor; this makes watchOS 27 the first version of watchOS to run exclusively on Apple Watch models with arm64 processors, and marks the first time Apple has dropped 5 Apple Watch models at once.

Overview of watchOS 27 versions
Version	Build	Release date	Features
27.0	24R364	September 14, 2026	Initial release on Apple Watch Series 12 and Apple Watch Ultra 4 Drops support for the Apple Watch Series 6, Apple Watch Series 7, Apple Watch Series 8, Apple Watch Ultra (1st generation), and Apple Watch SE 2.: Siri AI app; Dynamic app grid; Find My now unifies people, items and devices tracking into one map; Index-and-thumb widget control; Workout Buddy (requires Apple Intelligence) adds Spanish; Call Context surfaces relevant app data during ongoing phone calls; Cycle Tracking adds native perimenopause and menopause symptom logging; Wallet passes syncs custom user barcodes and QR codes from your iPhone; Security notes
27.0.1	24R365	September 23, 2026	Series 12 and Ultra 4 only: Fixed a bug where the watch may randomly restart; No security notes
27.0.1	24R365	September 28, 2026	All other models
27.2	24S118	October 26, 2026	Siri AI can now: Recall past conversations; Pull information from additional sources; Provide faster responses on Apple Watch; Respond and talk to users in more languages; this includes French, Japanese, Korean, Portuguese, and Spanish; Excluded Apps: Allows you to choose which apps Siri AI, search, or suggestions can use; Security notes
27.2.1	24S132	November 9, 2026	Security notes
27.3 beta 2	24S5296d	November 16, 2026	
Legend: Unsupported Supported Latest version Preview version

== Hardware support ==
Supported watchOS versions on the Apple Watch
Model	watchOS												
Model	1	2	3	4	5	6	7	8	9	10	11	26	27
1st	Yes	Yes	Yes	Yes	No	No	No	No	No	No	No	No	No
Series 1	—N/a	—N/a	Yes	Yes	Yes	Yes	No	No	No	No	No	No	No
Series 2	—N/a	—N/a	Yes	Yes	Yes	Yes	No	No	No	No	No	No	No
Series 3	—N/a	—N/a	—N/a	Yes	Yes	Yes	Yes	Yes	No	No	No	No	No
Series 4	—N/a	—N/a	—N/a	—N/a	Yes	Yes	Yes	Yes	Yes	Yes	No	No	No
Series 5	—N/a	—N/a	—N/a	—N/a	—N/a	Yes	Yes	Yes	Yes	Yes	No	No	No
SE (1st)	—N/a	—N/a	—N/a	—N/a	—N/a	—N/a	Yes	Yes	Yes	Yes	No	No	No
Series 6	—N/a	—N/a	—N/a	—N/a	—N/a	—N/a	Yes	Yes	Yes	Yes	Yes	Yes	No
Series 7	—N/a	—N/a	—N/a	—N/a	—N/a	—N/a	—N/a	Yes	Yes	Yes	Yes	Yes	No
Series 8	—N/a	—N/a	—N/a	—N/a	—N/a	—N/a	—N/a	—N/a	Yes	Yes	Yes	Yes	No
Ultra (1st)	—N/a	—N/a	—N/a	—N/a	—N/a	—N/a	—N/a	—N/a	Yes	Yes	Yes	Yes	No
SE (2nd)	—N/a	—N/a	—N/a	—N/a	—N/a	—N/a	—N/a	—N/a	Yes	Yes	Yes	Yes	No
Series 9	—N/a	—N/a	—N/a	—N/a	—N/a	—N/a	—N/a	—N/a	—N/a	Yes	Yes	Yes	Yes
Ultra 2	—N/a	—N/a	—N/a	—N/a	—N/a	—N/a	—N/a	—N/a	—N/a	Yes	Yes	Yes	Yes
Series 10	—N/a	—N/a	—N/a	—N/a	—N/a	—N/a	—N/a	—N/a	—N/a	—N/a	Yes	Yes	Yes
SE 3	—N/a	—N/a	—N/a	—N/a	—N/a	—N/a	—N/a	—N/a	—N/a	—N/a	—N/a	Yes	Yes
Series 11	—N/a	—N/a	—N/a	—N/a	—N/a	—N/a	—N/a	—N/a	—N/a	—N/a	—N/a	Yes	Yes
Ultra 3	—N/a	—N/a	—N/a	—N/a	—N/a	—N/a	—N/a	—N/a	—N/a	—N/a	—N/a	Yes	Yes
Series 12	—N/a	—N/a	—N/a	—N/a	—N/a	—N/a	—N/a	—N/a	—N/a	—N/a	—N/a	—N/a	Yes
Ultra 4	—N/a	—N/a	—N/a	—N/a	—N/a	—N/a	—N/a	—N/a	—N/a	—N/a	—N/a	—N/a	Yes
