= Health Connect =

Health informatics API platform for Android

- Developers: Google; Samsung
- Release: November 14, 2022; 3 years ago (beta); March 2023; 3 years ago (general availability)
- Operating system: Android 9 Pie and later
- Platform: Mobile app Android system service
- Type: Health informatics API platform
- License: Proprietary
- Website: health.google/health-connect-android/

Health Connect (formerly Health Connect by Android) is a health informatics platform developed by Google in collaboration with Samsung for the Android operating system. The platform was announced in May 2022 at Google I/O and launched in public beta that November, serving as a centralized repository and API that lets health and fitness applications securely share and synchronize user health data across devices and services.

With the release of Android 14, Health Connect moved from being a standalone application downloaded through the Google Play store to a framework module integrated directly into the Android operating system. As of May 2024, more than 500 applications have integrated with the platform.

== History ==
=== Development and announcement ===
Google announced Health Connect in partnership with Samsung at the Google I/O developer conference on May 11, 2022. The two companies developed the platform to address a longstanding problem in Android's health and fitness ecosystem: different applications maintained their own separate data repositories, which made it difficult for users to get a unified view of their health information across multiple services.

The platform was developed with early access provided to select partners, including MyFitnessPal, Leap Fitness, and Withings.

=== Beta launch and adoption ===
On November 14, 2022, Health Connect became available in public beta as a downloadable application on the Google Play store. More than 10 health, fitness, and wellness applications launched integrations at the same time, including Fitbit, Samsung Health, Peloton, MyFitnessPal, Oura, and WeightWatchers.

The service left beta in March 2023 and started coming pre-installed on Google Pixel devices.

=== Integration into Android 14 ===
In May 2023, Google announced plans to make Health Connect a core part of Android 14, moving it from a standalone app to an integrated system service. This change put Health Connect in the Android Settings menu by default on devices running Android 14 or later. For older devices (those running Android Pie (version 9) through Android 13) Health Connect remains available as a downloadable app.

When users upgrade their devices to Android 14, the system automatically migrates existing Health Connect data and permissions from the standalone app to the system-integrated version.

=== Relationship with Google Fit ===
As Health Connect developed, Google began winding down the Google Fit platform. In 2022, the company announced that Google Fit APIs, including the REST API, would remain available until June 30, 2025, with Health Connect taking over as the primary platform for health data management on Android.

== Features and functionality ==
=== Platform architecture ===
Health Connect works as an on-device data repository, storing health and fitness information locally on the user's Android device in encrypted form. It provides a standardized API that lets applications perform CRUD (Create, Read, Update, Delete) operations on health data, subject to user permissions.

The system works with Android SDK version 28 (Android Pie) and higher, giving it broad compatibility across the Android ecosystem.

=== Supported data types ===
Health Connect handles more than 50 standardized health and fitness data types, organized into six main categories:

- Activity: step count, exercise sessions, distance, calories burned
- Body measurements: weight, height, body fat percentage, bone mass
- Cycle tracking: menstrual cycle data
- Nutrition: hydration, meals, macronutrients
- Sleep: sleep sessions, sleep stages
- Vitals: heart rate, blood pressure, body temperature, blood glucose, oxygen saturation

In March 2025, Health Connect added support for medical records in FHIR (Fast Healthcare Interoperability Resources) format, opening up integration with electronic health record systems.

=== Privacy and permissions ===
Users get granular permission controls that let them manage data access on a per-app, per-data-type basis. Specifically, users can:

- Grant or revoke app access to specific health data types
- See which applications have accessed their data
- Choose which data source takes priority when multiple apps provide the same data type
- Delete health data stored in Health Connect

All data in Health Connect stays on the device in encrypted form. There's no automatic sync to cloud services unless the user explicitly sets that up through individual apps.

== Adoption and ecosystem ==
=== Platform adoption ===
As of May 2024, more than 500 applications have integrated with Health Connect. Among major fitness platforms, approximately 20% of Peloton's new members use Health Connect, contributing to a 10% increase in members using the platform to log workouts over time.

=== Supported applications ===
As of 2025, Health Connect works with numerous health and fitness platforms, including:

- Samsung Health
- Fitbit
- Google Fit
- MyFitnessPal
- Peloton
- Oura
- Whoop
- WeightWatchers
- Garmin
- Pavlok

The platform pulls in data from wearable devices including Wear OS smartwatches and compatible fitness trackers. Garmin added official Health Connect support in July 2025, allowing one-way data sharing from Garmin devices to Health Connect.

=== Technical limitations ===
Health Connect doesn't handle certain specialized health metrics, such as electrocardiogram (ECG) readings and some proprietary metrics that individual device makers have developed. Also, not every app with Health Connect integration can read data written by other apps. Some services can only write data to the platform.

== See also ==
- Google Fit - predecessor health tracking platform
- Apple Health - equivalent health data platform for iOS
- Samsung Health - health tracking application with Health Connect integration
- Fitbit - wearable technology platform integrated with Health Connect
- Health informatics
- Wearable technology
