= Apple Fitness =

Mobile application developed by Apple

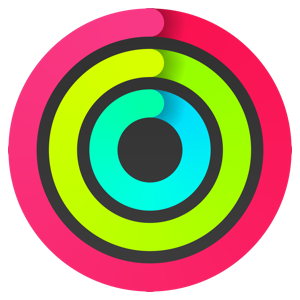

- Summary tab of the Fitness app on iOS 17 without a connected Apple Watch
- Developer: Apple
- Release: 9 March 2015; 11 years ago
- Operating system: iOS; watchOS; tvOS; iPadOS
- Type: Physical fitness
- Website: apple.com/apple-fitness-plus

Apple Fitness, formerly Activity, is an exercise tracking companion app by Apple available on iPhones running iOS 8.2 or above for users with a connected Apple Watch, later expanding to all iPhones regardless of Watch connectivity with the release of iOS 16. The application displays a summary view of user's recorded workouts from the Apple Watch or supported third-party apps and exercise equipment, as well as acting as the home for all Apple Fitness+ content.

== Features ==
The app displays three 'activity rings', which are daily movement goals, and encourages users to 'close' all of their rings by the end of the day. The move ring tracks the number of diet calories or kilojoules burned (over and above quiescent), the exercise ring tracks minutes spent exercising, and the stand ring tracks the number of hours spent standing for at least one minute. Without a connected Apple Watch, the app will only display the user's move ring as the exercise and stand metrics cannot be measured using the iPhone. Activity rings can be shared with others to compare data and start competitions, which give an award to the person who has filled their rings the most over a seven-day period. Users can earn various awards based on user achievement, such as setting personal records or participating in limited-time challenges. Awards are digital equivalents of enamel pins or badges.

All workouts recorded through the Workouts app on the Apple Watch are viewable through the 'Summary' tab of the Fitness app and include relevant metrics and HealthKit data, such as heart rate, depending on the type of exercise. For outdoor activities, summaries also include weather conditions at the time of the workout and a map that outlines the route taken while exercising. Since iOS 15, a record of mindfulness activities can also be viewed from the summary tab. After a 180-day period, the app will also begin to show users their exercise trends averaged over the present and past rolling 90-day windows, displaying arrows next to various metrics. Arrows which are facing up show an improvement in an area, whereas downwards facing arrows show a decline.

== Apple Fitness+ ==
Apple Fitness+ is an ad-free video on demand guided workout streaming service officially launched on 14 December 2020. The service provides several video workout guides and routines from fitness professionals, displaying exercise statistics from the Apple Watch in the top-right corner of the video in real-time. Each workout is set to a curated playlist, with Apple Music subscribers given the option to download a workout playlist to their device for other use.

The service is available within the Fitness app on iPhone, iPad, and Apple TV, and costs US$9.99 per month, US$79.99 per year, or is included in the premium tier of Apple One.

=== Available workouts ===
Workouts are available for thirteen activities: core, cycling, dance, high-intensity interval training (HIIT), meditation, mindful cooldown, rowing, strength, treadmill walk, treadmill run, kickboxing, pilates, and yoga. Most workouts have three trainers, with one performing a modified, less intensive, version of the host's workout. The third instructor either matches the primary instructor or, in some cases, performs a more intensive version. Shorter workouts are also available, which have only a single instructor and include further instructions for those new to a particular exercise.

As of November 2023, Apple Fitness+ has the largest library of 4K workouts on the internet. Apple Fitness+ has over 4000 workouts, ranging from 5 minutes to 45 minutes. Apple Fitness+ has been praised for its diversity and inclusion ever since the introduction of disabled experts. Additionally, Apple Fitness has stated that the workouts do not need equipment, but that basic dumbbells may be added simply to elevate your experience.

On 21 January 2021, the first batch of "Time to Walk" audio workouts were introduced. These podcasts for outdoor walking are led by celebrities from academia, entertainment, and sports, mixing talk with a short playlist. Similarly, "Time to Run" workouts were added to the service on 10 January 2022, which feature trainers completing popular running routes in different cities across the world while providing coaching and tips to the listener.

=== Launch ===
When Fitness+ was launched, it was available in Australia, Canada, Ireland, New Zealand, the UK, and the US. On 25 October 2021, Apple announced that beginning 3 November 2021, Fitness+ will also be available in 15 new countries, bringing the total number of countries the service is available to 21. In both new and existing markets, Fitness+ will be available in English, with subtitles in Brazilian Portuguese, English, French, German, Italian, Russian, and Spanish. Fitness+ will expand to 28 new markets including Chile, Hong Kong, India, Japan, the Netherlands, Singapore, Taiwan, and Philippines starting December 15, 2025.

With the release of iOS 16.1, users can subscribe to Apple Fitness+ without an Apple Watch, though fewer metrics are displayed during workouts.

With the release of iOS 17, users of Apple Fitness+ received new Custom Plans and Audio Focus features.

With iOS 18 and watchOS 11, Apple introduces the following new features: users can personalize the overview screen and utilize fitness widgets on the Home and Lock Screen. A new "Training Load" feature analyzes workout intensity. The "Vitals" view summarizes health data collected during sleep. Additionally, individual goals can be set for Activity Rings each day, and the rings can be paused for up to 90 days if needed. A new integration with the Journal App allows for the tracking of mindfulness minutes and mood logging.

== Harassment claim ==
In August 2025, Jay Blahnik, Apple's vice-president for fitness technologies, was accusing of creating a "toxic workplace culture", including claims of harassment, in his department. Apple denied the claims.

== See also ==
- Apple Health
- Google Fit
