= Fitbod =

Strength training app

- Original authors: Allen Chen and Jesse Venticinque
- Developers: Fitbod, Inc.
- Release: 2015
- Type: Fitness
- License: Proprietary
- Website: fitbod.me

Fitbod is a strength training app that uses machine learning and artificial intelligence to personalize workout routines based on the user's goals, available equipment, and past performance. It was founded in 2015 by Allen Chen and Jesse Venticinque. The app is available on iOS and Android with a free plan and a premium subscription. Fitbod also includes instructional videos for exercises and a recovery tracking feature that monitors muscle freshness.

== History ==
Fitbod was founded by Allen Chen and Jesse Venticinque in 2015. Chen, a fitness enthusiast, drew inspiration from a product development framework outlined in a book by Nir Eyal, applying its model of trigger, action, investment, and reward to the gym experience, identifying the uncertainty of not knowing what to do as the entry point. He sought to address this by creating an app that would provide personalized workout guidance through a mobile device. "I wanted my phone to just tell me which muscles I needed to engage," Chen said in an interview.

== Product overview ==
Fitbod is available on mobile devices with a free plan offering three workout options. A premium subscription, priced at US$15.99 per month or US$95.99 per year as of 2025, unlocks additional workout options. Fitbod is available on iOS and Android devices.

Upon creating a profile, users select their skill level, workout preferences, and available equipment, with the option to configure the app for bodyweight workouts if no equipment is available. Multiple profiles can be created to accommodate different locations and equipment configurations, such as a home gym, commercial gym, or travel setting. Users can also input fitness goals, including muscle toning, strength training, and muscle growth, which are customizable. Six workout categories are available, ranging from general fitness, cardio, high-intensity interval training (HIIT), weightlifting, to Olympic weightlifting, with session lengths configurable between 15 and 90 minutes. Blended workouts are also available, and each session includes warm-up and cool-down options.

Based on this information, the app uses machine learning algorithms and generative AI to generate a personalized workout targeting the user's selected muscle groups and their equipment available, with rep, weight, and/or time breakdowns for each exercise. The app provides instructional guidance on equipment usage and exercise selection, drawing from a large library of exercises. Each exercise is accompanied by an instructional video or GIF, with workouts customizable for sets, reps, and weight.

Fitbod's algorithm tracks past performance and prioritizes more rested muscles by default, incorporating a recovery feature that tracks muscle freshness based on previous workout data to help users target the most recovered muscle groups. In contrast to fixed workout programs, Fitbod is designed to adapt progressively to the user's performance and inputs over time. Progress measures, including personal records, exercise-level strength trends, muscle group strength, and recovery status, are viewable via a line graph displaying weekly, monthly, and yearly views, alongside a muscle map displaying the human body with muscles color-coded by usage intensity, indicating which groups are fatigued, overtrained, or undertrained. Users can also input body composition data, including body fat percentage, lean mass, and weight, which the algorithm factors into workout recommendations over time.

Workouts are logged in a checklist format and completed sessions generate awards recorded in the Log tab, including personal records for weight and reps, intended to gamify the workout experience. Fitbod also features a Max Effort Day option, which increases the rep suggestion for a selected exercise. Workouts can be exported to Strava, Fitbit, Apple Health and Apple Fitness, with data from those apps also pulled back into Fitbod to inform muscle fatigue and performance tracking.

== Reception ==
In 2019, Fitbod received the Apple Store Editor’s Choice award. As of January 2026, the app has surpassed 15 million downloads and 2.5 million active users, with more than 157 million workouts logged, and holds an average app store rating of 4.8 out of 5.0 across over 270,000 reviews.
