= Steve Kamb =

American author and fitness entrepreneur

- Born: Sandwich, Massachusetts, U.S.
- Education: Vanderbilt University
- Occupations: Author; entrepreneur; fitness instructor
- Known for: Founder of Nerd Fitness
- Website: stevekamb.com

Steve Kamb is an American author, entrepreneur and fitness instructor. He is the founder of Nerd Fitness, an online fitness company he launched in 2009 that pairs references to video games, science fiction and other elements of nerd culture with beginner-oriented health and fitness coaching. Kamb has written two trade-published books, Level Up Your Life (2016) and How to Try Again (2026).

== Early life and education ==
Kamb was born in Sandwich, Massachusetts. He attended Vanderbilt University in Nashville, Tennessee, graduating in 2006 with a bachelor's degree in economics. After college he worked in marketing for the live-event company Sixthman, where he contributed to the company blog, from December 2007 until June 2010, when he left to work on Nerd Fitness full-time.

== Career ==
=== Nerd Fitness ===
Kamb registered the domain NerdFitness.com and began publishing fitness articles in 2009, after finding no existing website that combined nerd culture with beginner fitness advice. He has said the idea was inspired by The 4-Hour Workweek, which suggested building a business around a personal interest and a community one already belongs to. Members of the resulting community are referred to as "the Rebellion", a name and visual identity Kamb adapted from the Rebel Alliance of Star Wars.

The site grew from a personal blog into a company offering digital guides, an online coaching program and an instructional membership called the Nerd Fitness Academy. Early products included the digital guides Rebel Fitness Guide, Rebel Strength Guide and Rebel Running Guide; in 2015 Kamb released a beginners' guide titled Nerd Fitness Yoga. Kamb has lectured on behavior change and habit formation at companies and events including Google, Facebook and TEDxEmory.

=== Writing ===
Kamb's first book, Level Up Your Life: How to Unlock Adventure and Happiness by Becoming the Hero of Your Own Story, was published by Rodale Books on January 12, 2016. The book applies game-design and habit-formation concepts to personal goal-setting. In 2025 Kamb said he had reacquired the publishing rights to the title and planned a tenth-anniversary edition for late 2026.

His second book, How to Try Again: An Approachable Guide to Navigating Chaos and Making Change That Sticks, was published by St. Martin's Press in the United States on June 16, 2026, and by Pan Macmillan in the United Kingdom. The book outlines a four-step framework Kamb calls the "PACT" method for resuming goals after a setback, and argues against what it describes as the "optimization culture" of much self-improvement writing. It carried pre-publication endorsements from authors including Mark Manson, David Epstein, Nir Eyal, Josh Kaufman and Vanessa Van Edwards. Kamb signed the contract for the book in 2023 and wrote it over the following years, a period during which he went through a breakup and reduced the size of the Nerd Fitness staff; he drew on those experiences in the book.

In a review, Publishers Weekly summarized the book as a roadmap for starting over after failure, praised its concrete tools and self-deprecating humor, and described it as an "upbeat invitation to start afresh".

== Bibliography ==
- Kamb, Steve (2016). Level Up Your Life: How to Unlock Adventure and Happiness by Becoming the Hero of Your Own Story. Rodale Books. ISBN 978-1-62336-540-0.
- Kamb, Steve (2026). How to Try Again: An Approachable Guide to Navigating Chaos and Making Change That Sticks. St. Martin's Press. ISBN 978-1-250-34464-9.

== Personal life ==
Kamb lives in Nashville, Tennessee.
