= Leher =

Leher App
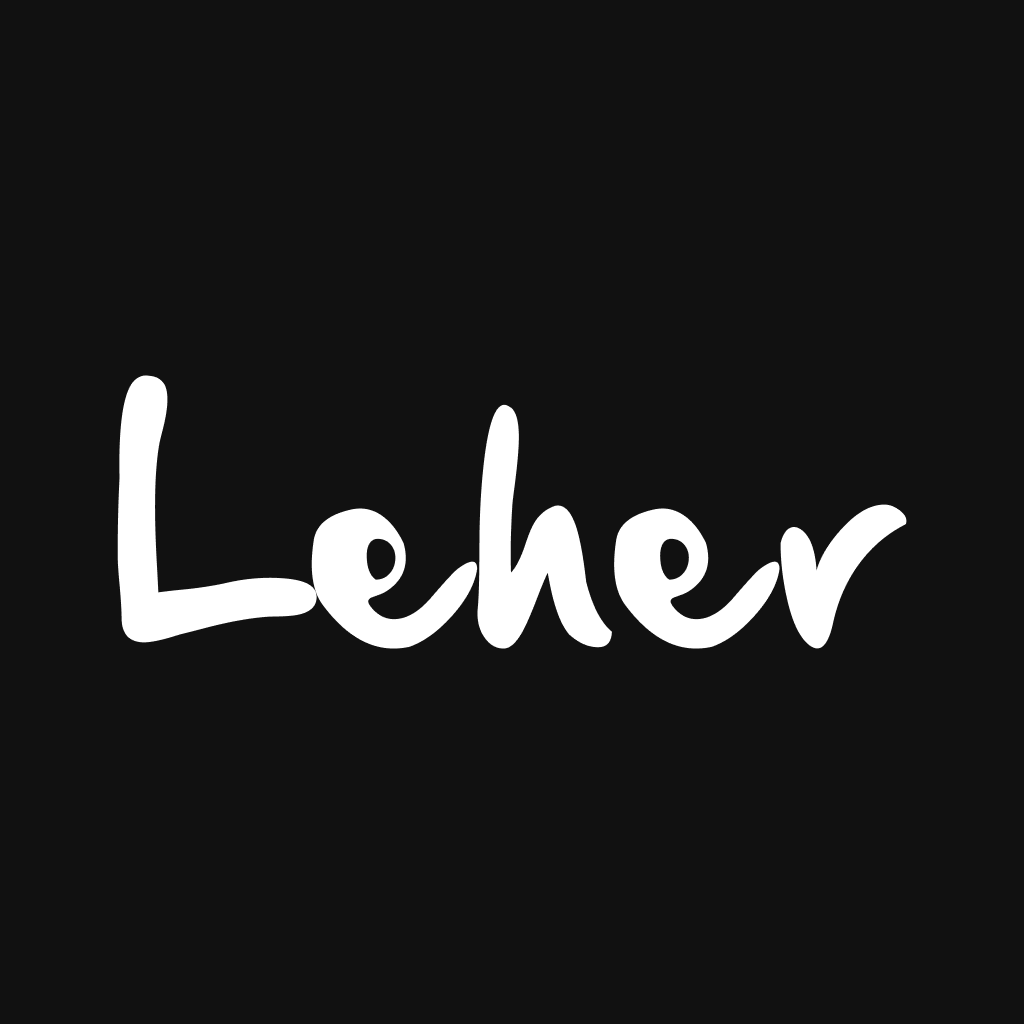
- Developer(s): Leher.AI Pvt Ltd
- Initial release: August 2018
- Operating system: Android, iOS, Web
- Type: Social network
- Website: leher.app

Leher is an Indian social networking service that facilitates audio and video discussion rooms. Leher is an audio-video platform where users can listen to and join conversations, interviews, and discussions between people on various topics. Leher had around 170,000 downloads in March 2021. Leher is a direct competitor to Clubhouse.

== History ==
Leher was launched in August 2018, and it launched the live audio video discussions feature late-2019. The app gained popularity during the COVID-19 pandemic in India as consumers shifted to social media in quarantine.

Leher was selected for Google India's Google for Startups Accelerator program in 2020.

Notable users on Leher include Nir Eyal, Salman Khurshid, Roopa Ganguly, Keith Teare, Mylswamy Annadurai, and Khushbu.

== Features ==
The app has multiple communication modes like private audio rooms, recorded video and audio rooms, direct messaging, and clubs.

== Founders ==
Leher was created by Vikas Malpani, co-founder of Commonfloor and Atul Jaju, who was a senior executive at Goldman Sachs before creating Leher.
