= IOS 17 =

2023 mobile operating system

iOS 17
- Version of the iOS operating system

- iOS 17 home screen on an iPhone 13
- Developer: Apple
- Written in: C, C++, Objective-C, Swift, assembly language
- OS family: iOS
- Working state: No longer supported
- General availability: September 18, 2023; 3 years ago
- Latest release: 17.7.2 (November 19, 2024; 24 months ago) [±]
- Available in: 42 languages
- Kernel type: Hybrid (XNU)
- License: Proprietary software with open-source components
- Preceded by: iOS 16
- Succeeded by: iOS 18
- Official website: iOS 17 at the Wayback Machine (archived June 3, 2024)
- Tagline: Every day. More extraordinary.

Support status
- Obsolete, unsupported since all iPhones that support iOS 17 support iOS 18 or later. Widespread third-party app support.

Articles in the series

iOS 17 is the seventeenth major release of Apple's iOS operating system for the iPhone. It is the direct successor to iOS 16. It was announced on June 5, 2023, at Apple's annual Worldwide Developers Conference alongside watchOS 10, iPadOS 17, tvOS 17, and macOS Sonoma. It was made publicly available on September 18, 2023, as a free software update for supported iOS devices (see the supported devices section). It was succeeded by iOS 18 on September 16, 2024.

== Early development ==
iOS 17's internal codename is Dawn. Apple initially intended iOS 17 as a "tuneup release", similar to iOS 12, Mac OS X 10.1, Mac OS X Jaguar, and Mac OS X Snow Leopard, allowing them to focus on their new Apple Vision Pro mixed reality headset, though they added major features later in the development cycle.

== System features ==
=== Home Screen ===
- Widgets on the Home Screen and lock screen are now interactive. For example, a user can turn on lights or open shutters of a house by pressing the corresponding button of the Home widget, mark a task complete by pressing directly on a reminder in the widget, etc.
- Spotlight search now allows users to change system settings directly from the search results. For example, if a user searches for "wifi" from the Home Screen, the switch to turn the Wi-Fi off or on appears in the search results.
- The brightness of the wallpaper image changes depending on the dark or light mode, instead of being the same on both.
- Resized photos are now automatically extended to the top with a gradient that fills the missing space.
- Live wallpapers return after being removed from iOS 16, though they must now be selected separately from other photos and only animate when the phone is turned on.

=== StandBy ===
- StandBy is a new feature automatically enabled when the phone is charging while horizontally oriented. It displays information via widgets in intelligent stacks, live activities, photos, the date, the clock, etc. The appearance of this information changes according to the ambient light, with dimmer and less flashy colors appearing at night.

=== Autocorrect and text prediction ===
- The keyboard's autocorrection and dictation are powered by a new on-device transformer model, which is advertised to be more accurate and personalized to users' writing styles.
- Unlike previous versions of iOS, it can learn not to autocorrect swear words.
- Autocorrected words are underlined and can be reverted with a tap.
- Word predictions are shown inline as gray letters that are added when the spacebar is tapped.
- As of iOS 17.2, the option to turn off inline predictions without turning off predictive text was added, which allows the user to switch autocorrect to that of its functions in versions prior to iOS 8.

=== Translation ===
- Ukrainian was added for translation available system-wide, in Safari web pages, and in the Translate app, bringing the number of languages available to twenty.

=== AirDrop ===
- With the addition of NameDrop, by tapping an iPhone or Apple Watch against another iPhone, users can start a file transfer, a shared activity with SharePlay, or exchange a customizable contact card. (Using NameDrop with an Apple Watch requires iOS 17.1 and watchOS 10.1.)
- As of iOS 17.1, AirDrop file transfers can continue over the Internet if users leave AirDrop range.

=== Siri ===
- Users can now simply address Siri by its name instead of having to say "Hey Siri" to activate it.
- Subsequent questions asked to Siri do not require the user to repeat the "Siri" command.
- The user can now say "Hey Siri, send a message" and then choose the application to use through a drop-down menu. After the first change, Siri will remember the choice and speed up the operation.
- Users can ask Siri to read a page in Safari.
- Additionally, the ability to find a lost Apple TV remote with Siri was added.

=== AutoFill ===
- The information saved by the user in Contacts can be used to automatically and securely fill in the fields of a form of a PDF or scanned document. Scanning documents take place in Notes.

=== Accessibility ===
- A new feature called Personal Voice uses machine learning to let users recreate their own voice as a text-to-speech model.
- Using Point and speak, the phone will read what is written on the push-button panels of household appliances.
- A feature called Assistive Access is an extremely simplified iOS user interface that can be activated from the Accessibility settings, useful for people with cognitive disabilities.

=== Networking ===
- A user can now connect an iPhone to a private 5G or LTE cellular network, using an eSIM or physical SIM that has been specifically provisioned for that network.
- There is also a new setting for cellular networks that allows users to disable cellular data usage statistics if they do not care which apps are consuming data.

=== System settings ===
- In addition to an updated UI that shows more categories, the iPhone Storage section in the Settings app now shows the space occupied by data shared between multiple apps from the same manufacturer.
- In the Haptic Touch duration settings, there is a third duration that is even shorter than the other two available in iOS 16.
- A new option for Focus mode notifications was added called Silence Notifications. This option lets the user choose if they want to mute notifications always or only when the device is locked.
- In iOS 17, the default notification sound was changed from "Tri-tone" to "Rebound", which is noticeably quieter. As of iOS 17.2, the ability to change the default sound effect for third-party apps was added, including the previously default "Tri-tone" option.

=== Charging ===
- iPhone 15 models support Qi2 wireless charging. This was later added to the iPhone 13 and iPhone 14 models in the iOS 17.2 update.

=== DockKit ===
- The DockKit framework was introduced in iOS 17, which lets iPhones work with motorized stands and gimbals licensed through the MFi Program.

== App features ==
=== Phone ===
- With Contact Posters, users can now customize the appearance of the incoming call screen shown to other iPhone users.
  - Customization options are similar to iOS 16's revamped lock screen, with the ability to pick a custom picture or Memoji as the contact photo, and change their name's font and color.
- On the incoming call screen, a new Live Voicemail button sends the call to voicemail and shows a live transcript on-screen, so the user can decide whether to pick up the call.
- Other improvements:
  - Different ringtones for each SIM.
  - Increased number of memorized numbers in call history to 2,000.
  - Users can choose which SIM to use to call all unknown numbers.
  - The buttons to end a phone call, mute the microphone, etc. are positioned at the bottom instead of being in the center of the screen, so they are more accessible when using the phone with only one hand.
  - Added more than 20 new ringtones and 11 new alert tones, while moving the previous main ones into the classic section. Two of the ringtones ("Chalet" and "Daybreak") were composed by Flying Lotus, while Max Richter composed "Seedling" and "Unfold".

=== Messages ===
- The Messages app has a new "Check In" feature.
  - The user must pick a contact and set a destination, and Check In notifies the contact once the user reaches the destination safely. If the user stops moving towards the destination and does not respond to prompts, the user's location, route, and battery level are automatically shared with the contact. The contact otherwise has no access to the user's location, and this information is end-to-end encrypted.
- Other improvements:
  - The Messages app also shows a transcript of voice messages.
  - Emojis and photo cutouts (created through the "remove subject from background" tool) can be used as stickers, and stamped on bubbles in iMessage conversations or in other apps.
  - In iOS 17.2, a new feature called contact key verification was added. This adds an extra layer of security to iMessages, as these keys are exchanged by users when they meet up in person or can be automatically shared with FaceTime, and if at any point a device not registered with the key sends a message, the other user will be notified.

=== Journal ===
- Journal is an end-to-end–encrypted journaling app that lets users log their daily activities. The app was not available at launch and was added in the iOS 17.2 update.

=== Apple Music ===
- A new feature called a "Collaborative Playlist" allows a group of users to add and remove songs from a shared playlist. (This was removed in iOS 17.2 beta 4, but later re-added in 17.3.)
- A new Crossfade effect between played songs, supporting a range between one second and 12 seconds.
- Animated album artwork in music player: albums that support animated album artwork will now show that animation in the music player on Apple Music.
- In iOS 17.1, the "Love" system in Apple Music was replaced by a "Favorites" section that comes with expanded functionality.
- In iOS 17.2, a Favorite Songs Playlist was added.
- With iOS 17.2, users can now disable Listening History in a focus mode.

=== Apple Maps ===
- Maps can now be downloaded for use without an Internet connection.
- It is possible to see in real time the availability of charging points for electric vehicles, in particular how many free slots there are at that particular charging point, the type of connection, etc.
- Users can search people on the map by name if they have shared their location.

=== Safari ===
- Safari supports Profiles to keep a user's browsing activities separate when they are at work or school from those at home or personal. Individual Safari extensions can be enabled or disabled by profile.
- Pages previously opened in Private browsing mode require Face ID to be reviewed.
- Any extension that can read info on a page the user visits is disabled by default when private browsing.
- Known trackers are blocked while private browsing and tracking IDs in links are automatically removed.
- In the Safari settings, users can set a separate search engine to use in private mode.
- Users are able to listen to an entire page as audio read from the phone.
- The browsing history now shows favicons next to the site name and description.
- Added support for JPEG XL and HEIC image formats.
- AV1 hardware decoding on iPhone 15 Pro and iPhone 15 Pro Max.

=== Notes ===
- Users can create links between notes to quickly jump from one note to another.
- Users can view and annotate PDFs directly within the app.

=== Reminders ===
- The list of a reminder can now be organized into sections.
- The Grocery list now automatically sorts grocery items into sections.
- There is a new column view.

=== Photos ===
- Users can search for recipes on the Internet using a photo containing food.
- Dogs and cats are automatically recognized and categorized within the people section.
- When a user zooms in on a photo, a button automatically appears to crop the photo without having to go into photo editing first.
- In the search box, users can type the name of an object to find the exact frame in the video where that object appears.
- Visual Lookup is now able to recognize in photos the symbols of the various lights in the car, the symbols in the labels of clothes, etc.

=== Camera ===
- The Camera app has two new optional settings: "Level" shows a horizontal line that turns yellow when the subject is aligned to the horizon, and "Lock white balance" can disable automatic white balance adjustments when recording a video.
- Deferred Photo Processing: the Deep Fusion post-processing process is performed in the background, instead of taking place at the same time as the "shot" and only when the camera is not in use. This ensures significantly higher recording sessions, without shutter blocks, allowing the user to capture new photos at any time.

=== Weather ===
- A wind map has been added.
- The Weather app now lets users compare today's weather with yesterday's.
- Moon phase: a new section shows the current state of the moon, the time until the next full moon, the times of moonset and moonrise and the lunar calendar.

=== Health ===
- The Health app lets users log and label their mood, and see how their mood correlates to various lifestyle factors over time.
- The app also let users take standardized assessments for anxiety and depression, although this information is not diagnosis and should not be treated as such.
- Users can be notified if they forget to log that they have taken their medication.
- Added summary of users' friends' training results.

=== Shortcuts ===
- Commands associated with various apps are shown in Spotlight search when users search for that app. For example, when searching for the Camera app, commands to open the app in Selfie, Portrait, Cinematic, Time-Lapse, etc. modes are shown.
- Developers can define the background color of commands created for their app. For example, for the Books app, the commands to open the current book and listen to the current book appear in an orange box like the color of the Books app.

=== Miscellaneous ===
- The Home app now includes an activity history for up to 30 days, so the user can see who has accessed the user's locks, doors and alarm sensors, and when.
- Apple Fitness+ can give users custom workout plans, set workouts or meditations to play consecutively, or separately change the volume of the music and the instructor's voice.
- A new feature called "Screen Distance" checks and warns users if they are holding their Face ID-enabled iPhone too close to the user's face for a considerable period of time.
- The Clock app now supports simultaneous timers.
- Find My supports sharing AirTags and similar third-party items with up to five people.
- FaceTime supports the ability for callers to leave a video or audio message when the recipient is unavailable. Effect reactions have been added to FaceTime calls, similar to the reactions feature in Messages.

== Security and privacy ==
- One-time verification codes received in Mail can be filled in with a tap without leaving Safari.
- The ability to automatically delete verification codes was added.
- Link-tracking protection detects user-definable tracking parameters in link URLs and automatically removes them. It is automatically enabled in Mail, Messages, and when browsing with Safari in Private Mode.
- Shared group passwords allows the user to create groups of passwords to share with family and friends. Users can recover passwords for up to 30 days.
- After changing the lock screen passcode, the old code can be used for 72 hours to reset the new passcode if it is forgotten. There is also a button to expire the previous passcode immediately.
- iOS 17 contains several changes for app permissions. When an app wants to add an event to the user's Calendar, the event is added without the app being able to read the entire contents of the calendar. When apps ask to access the user's entire photo library, the user can share specific photos with apps while keeping the rest of the library private.
- A sensitive content warning detects nudity in photos and videos received in AirDrop and other apps, obscuring them with a blur effect before they are displayed.
- Lockdown mode can block the iPhone from connecting to 2G cellular networks and from auto-joining insecure wireless networks, and it disables more APIs in Safari susceptible to being attacked, such as IndexedDB, File API, FileReader API, WebSpeech API, WebLocks API, and more. (Apple's simultaneously announced watchOS 10 gains support for Lockdown mode, and the mode is automatically enabled on Apple Watch when it is enabled on a paired iPhone.)

== European Union–specific changes ==
In compliance with the Digital Markets Act, Apple introduced a set of additional features only for those living in European Union countries. These features were rolled out beginning with iOS 17.4.

These include:

- The installation of third-party alternatives to the App Store.
- The ability to download web browsers that use web engines other than WebKit.
- Management of default web browser settings.
- The ability for a user to choose alternative payment methods to use in the App Store.

Additionally, Apple has put in place measures to prevent all users outside of the EU from accessing any of those features.

These measures include:

- Requiring a user's Apple ID region to be set to one of the EU's 27 member states.
- Performing routine on-device geolocation checks to ensure a user is physically present within the EU's borders.
- Making it so that users who travel out of the EU can continue accessing third-party app stores for a grace period of 30 days. Users who are away from the EU for more than 30 days will lose access to these features; they can continue using previously installed apps but are unable to update or install apps from third-party app stores.

=== Initial plans to remove web apps ===
With the second beta of iOS 17.4, the functionality of progressive web apps was severely restricted; web apps added to the home screen opened as bookmarks in the user's default browser. While this was initially believed to be a bug, Apple confirmed on February 15, 2024, that they would be removed, justifying their choice by low use, as well as security and privacy concerns and the Digital Markets Act. On February 26, it was announced that the European Commission was planning to investigate Apple over the move, and requested more information from the company and app developers for further assessment. The Open Web Advocacy wrote a letter to Tim Cook and asked him to not "sabotage" the feature. On March 1, Apple announced that it had canceled its plan to disable home screen web apps in the European Union; Apple's developer website was then updated to reflect this.

=== Privacy and security measures ===
Apple has expressed concerns regarding the potential impact of third-party app marketplaces on user privacy and device security. Allowing app installations outside the official App Store may increase the risk of malware, scams, and harmful content. To mitigate these risks, Apple has implemented a notarization process that requires all apps—regardless of distribution channel—to undergo automated and human review to identify known security threats and ensure compliance with platform policies. Additionally, third-party marketplace developers must adhere to strict operational guidelines, including providing transparency regarding data handling and ensuring mechanisms for user support and reporting abuse. Despite these safeguards, Apple maintains that the changes may expose users to elevated security risks compared to the standard App Store environment.

== Supported devices ==
iOS 17 requires iPhones with an A12 Bionic SoC (Note: iPhone XS, XS Max, and XR) or later. It drops support for iPhones with an A11 Bionic (Note: iPhone 8, 8 Plus and X) SoC, officially marking the end of support for iPhones with a 5.5-inch display. iOS 17 is the first version of iOS to drop support for an iPhone with Face ID and no Home button. The iPhone SE (2nd and 3rd generations) are the only supported devices to feature Touch ID and the Home button.

However, iPhones with an A12 Bionic or A13 Bionic (Note: iPhone 11, 11 Pro, 11 Pro Max, and the second-generation SE) SoC have limited support (Note: Effect reactions, inline word prediction and completion with the tap of the spacebar, and Point and speak are not available on iPhones older than the iPhone 12 series.) while iPhones with an A14 Bionic SoC and later (Note: iPhone 12, 12 Mini, 12 Pro, and 12 Pro Max) are fully supported.

iPhones that support iOS 17 are:

- iPhone XS and XS Max
- iPhone XR
- iPhone 11
- iPhone 11 Pro and 11 Pro Max
- iPhone SE (2nd generation)
- iPhone 12 and 12 Mini
- iPhone 12 Pro and 12 Pro Max
- iPhone 13 and 13 Mini
- iPhone 13 Pro and 13 Pro Max
- iPhone SE (3rd generation)
- iPhone 14 and 14 Plus
- iPhone 14 Pro and 14 Pro Max
- iPhone 15 and 15 Plus
- iPhone 15 Pro and 15 Pro Max

== Version history ==
The first developer beta of iOS 17 was released on June 5, 2023. Unlike previous years, the developer beta program is open to anyone with a free Apple Developer account, without requiring a subscription.

Version	Build	Codename	Release date	Release notes
17.0	21A326; 21A327	Dawn	September 22, 2023	Initial release for iPhone 15 lineup
17.0	21A329	Dawn	September 18, 2023	Developer Documentation; All models except iPhone 15 and 15 Pro
17.0	21A331	Dawn	September 18, 2023	iPhone 15 and 15 Pro models only
17.0.1	21A340	Dawn	September 21, 2023	All models except iPhone 15 and 15 Pro
17.0.2	21A350	Dawn	September 21, 2023	iPhone 15 and 15 Pro models only
17.0.2	21A351	Dawn	September 26, 2023	All models except iPhone 15 and 15 Pro
17.0.3	21A360	Dawn	October 4, 2023	
17.1	21B74	DawnB	October 25, 2023	Developer documentation All models except iPhone 15 and 15 Pro
17.1	21B80	DawnB	October 25, 2023	iPhone 15 and 15 Pro models only
17.1.1	21B91	DawnB	November 7, 2023	
17.1.2	21B101	DawnB	November 30, 2023	
17.2	21C62	DawnC	December 11, 2023	
17.2.1	21C66	DawnC	December 19, 2023	
17.3	21D50	DawnD	January 22, 2024	
17.3.1	21D61	DawnD	February 8, 2024	
17.4	21E219	DawnE	March 5, 2024	
17.4.1	21E236	DawnE	March 21, 2024	
17.4.1	21E237	DawnE	March 26, 2024	
17.5	21F79	DawnF	May 13, 2024	
17.5.1	21F90	DawnF	May 20, 2024	
17.6	21G80	DawnG	July 29, 2024	
17.6.1	21G93	DawnG	August 7, 2024	
17.6.1	21G101	DawnG	August 19, 2024	
17.7	21H16	DawnH	September 16, 2024	
17.7.1	21H216	DawnH	October 28, 2024	OTA only
17.7.2	21H221	DawnH	November 19, 2024	OTA only

See Apple's official release notes and official security update contents.

== Reception ==
Reception for iOS 17 upon its release date was generally positive. Critics praised the new Contact Posters, Check In, and StandBy mode. They also liked the improvements to stickers, widgets, text prediction, the Camera app, Shortcuts, verification codes, and the Reminders app. However, many media outlets criticized the lack of the Journal app that was announced during the iOS 17 segment. The Journal app was later released, first as part of the iOS 17.2 beta to developers and public beta testers, then to the general public as part of the iOS 17.2 stable release. Following the release of iOS 17, users reported overheating problems on newer devices such as iPhone 15 and iPhone 15 Pro, and numerous glitches on older devices.

== See also ==
- iPadOS 17
- macOS Sonoma
- tvOS 17
- watchOS 10
- visionOS 1

== Notes ==
Preceded by iOS 16	iOS 17; 2023	Succeeded by iOS 18
