= Apple One =

Subscription bundle

- Developer: Apple
- Type: Subscription service bundle
- Launched: October 30, 2020
- Platforms: iPhone; iPad; Apple TV; Apple Watch; Mac; Vision Pro
- Operating systems: iOS 14 or later; iPadOS 14 or later; tvOS 14 or later; macOS Big Sur or later; visionOS
- Status: Active
- Website: apple.com/apple-one

Apple One is a subscription service that bundles several premium services from Apple into tiered packages, first offered in late 2020. The three tiers offered are Individual, Family, and Premier, with all three providing access to Apple Music, Apple TV+, Apple Arcade, and iCloud storage (50 GB for Individual, 200 GB for Family, and 2TB for Premier). The Premier tier also includes Apple News+ and Apple Fitness+. Both family and premier packages allow family sharing for up to six accounts. Additional iCloud storage can be purchased on top of an Apple One subscription.

== Description ==
Apple One was announced on September 15, 2020, during the Apple Event and later launched globally on October 30. Plans for a services bundle had been in development at Apple for years, as part of the company's efforts to increase its revenue from services and decrease its reliance on hardware sales.

The subscription groups' premium services are provided by Apple in tiered packages. The three tiers offered are Individual, Family, and Premier, with all three providing access to Apple Music, Apple TV+, Apple Arcade, and iCloud storage (50 GB for Individual, 200 GB for Family, and 2TB for Premier). The Premier tier also includes Apple News+ and Apple Fitness+. Both family and premier packages allow family sharing for up to six accounts. Additional iCloud storage can be purchased on top of an Apple One subscription.

Apple One subscription bundles are designed to entice users to subscribe to other services they might not otherwise consider, such as Apple Arcade or Apple News+, by offering them together at a discounted price.

At launch, the service cost $14.95/month for an Individual Plan, $19.95/month for a Family Plan, and $29.95/month for a Premier Plan. At these prices, a user who would intend to pay for each component service contained in the Individual bundle would save roughly $6 monthly by instead paying for Apple One at the Individual tier, while under the same premise, a Family tier subscriber would save $8 per month, and a Premier tier subscriber roughly $25 per month.

Currently, Apple One is priced as $19.95/month for the Individual Plan, $27.95/month for the Family Plan, and $39.95/month for the Premier Plan. At these prices, assuming the user intended to purchase the services separately, the Individual Plan saves users roughly $9 monthly, a Family Plan saves $11 monthly, and the Premier Plan saves $29 monthly.

In late 2025, after the Apple TV rebrand, Apple also rebranded the Apple One logo, displaying the Apple logo in 6 color slices, resembling its former Apple logo used in the Jobs' era. Each color in this new logo reflects one of Apple's services.

In September 2026, the company launched a new strategy in over 100 smaller or more price sensitive countries, whereby iCloud+ customers on all paid plans (starting at US$0.99 or local equivalent) would automatically get Apple TV, Apple Arcade, and a limited version of Apple Music for no extra charge, and could upgrade to the full version of Apple Music for a discounted price. In affected countries where Apple One had been available, the service will be closed to new customers, but existing Apple One customers in these markets can keep their plans for the time being.

== Price increases ==
On October 24, 2022, Apple announced it would increase the prices of Apple One (along with Apple Music and Apple TV+) subscriptions in many regions. The Individual plan increased $2 to $16.95/month, the Family plan increased $3 to $22.95/month, and the Premier plan increased $3 to $32.95/month.

At these prices, assuming the user intended to purchase the services separately, the Individual Plan saved users about $7 per month, the Family Plan saved $8 per month, and the Premier Plan saved $24 per month.

On November 3, 2023, Apple announced it would increase the prices of Apple One subscriptions. The Individual plan increased $3 to $19.95/month, the Family plan increased $3 to $25.95/month The Premium Plan increased $5 to $37.95/month.

Under the current pricing scheme, assuming the user intends to purchase services separately, the Individual Plan saves users roughly $9 monthly, the Family Plan saves $11 monthly, and the Premier Plan saves $29 monthly.

== Reception ==
The Verge has compared the service to Amazon Prime, through its bundling of Amazon Prime Video and Amazon Music. CNET noted that the service's biggest draw is its inclusion of iCloud services.

=== Competitor response ===
Spotify has raised concerns that Apple may be exploiting a dominant position, claiming that Apple One puts competitors at a disadvantage as consumers are favoured for using Apple's own services over alternatives, due to Apple's control of the iOS platform. Spotify called on competition regulators to act, arguing that the practice should be considered anti-competitive and, as such, subject to restrictions and regulation.

== See also ==
- Pixel Pass
