= Daylio =

App by Habitics

- Developer: Habitics s.r.o.
- Operating system: Android, iOS
- Type: Journaling
- Website: https://daylio.net/

Daylio is a diary and mood tracking app available on iOS and Android. The iOS app is published by Relaxio, while the Android app on the Google Play Store is published by Habitics.

== App functionality ==
Daylio's most basic functionality allows users to enter their mood on a five-point scale and optionally write an associated journal entry. Users can also enter in activities from pre-defined list, or create custom activities. There is also support for adding up to three photos to each diary entry. The app employs various strategies to incentivize frequent entries, such as a daily streak system, push notifications, and achievements. Users can view graphs and statistics generated from their mood entries. They can also use the app to track goal achievements such as health and fitness goals.

Daylio provides several statistics displayed in charts, such as a monthly mood line graph and an average daily mood bar chart. These are automatically updated as the user inputs more data. Users can export and share the charts as images, and also export the logged statistics as a .csv file.

Each daily entry is automatically color coded based on the mood entered by the user, and included in part of a "Year in Pixels" display. This concept of displaying a mosaic of colored mood dots was originally conceived by Camillede Passion Carnets for use in Bullet Journals.

While many of Daylio's basic features are available for free, the app also offers a paid premium option. This adds features such as the removal of ads for Android, a PIN lock for iOS, advanced stats, automatic backups, and more icons and emojis.

== Reception ==
Beenish M. Chaudhry, a member of the Department of Computer Science and Engineering, Interdisciplinary Center for Network Science and Applications at the University of Notre Dame claims that:

The simplistic interface design consisting of the ability to tap an icon to record a mood and an activity (if needed) is a major success of this application since it allows people to record what's going on even when they are at their worst and without being overwhelmed. Hence, people can collect more data (especially when it is most useful) to identify triggers to specific moods and visualize trends better.

Daylio has also been cited by LifeHacker.com as being good "If you want a private and fast micro journal".

A study by Hussain et al. (2020) points out a few weaknesses of the app. These include an unwelcoming sign up screen, in-app permissions related to sensitive data, a non-standardized design between IOS and Android platforms, and unclear/crowded icons.
