= Mindfulness (Apple) =

Watch application developed by Apple Inc

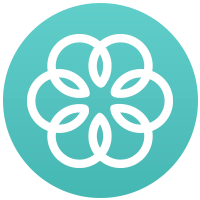

- Mindfulness app in watchOS 26
- Developer: Apple
- Release: September 13, 2016; 10 years ago
- Operating system: watchOS, visionOS
- Type: Guided meditation

Mindfulness, formerly Breathe, is an application developed by Apple for watchOS and visionOS devices. It was first introduced with the release of WatchOS 3 and later alongside the launch of the Apple Vision Pro. The app reminds users to practice mindfulness through simple guided meditation activities, encouraging users to reflect upon and bring attention to their wellbeing throughout the day.

== Overview ==
After beginning a breathe session, a user is instructed to take deep breaths in while several overlapping blue circles grow bigger, exhaling as they return to their original size. At the end of a session, the user's heart rate is shown alongside the number of "mindfulness minutes" completed for the day, which can also be seen in the Health and Fitness apps on a linked iPhone device. A breathe-inspired watch face is also available in classic, calm, and focus options. The visionOS version of the app features a similar breathing session, which presents a sphere made out of petal-like objects that spread apart when instructed to inhale, slowly returning back to their original formation upon exhale. Furthermore, Apple Fitness+ subscribers can follow an audio-guided meditation from a trainer or complete their own self-guided session.

With watchOS 8, a "reflect" mode was introduced, which provides users with a prompt or question to think about over a minute period. While completing a reflect activity, the watch displays a screen that cycles through different colors in motion.

watchOS 10 added mood tracking through the app's "State of Mind" feature, which allows users to log a range of emotions, either at a particular moment in time or their general mood for the day. Additional information can also be provided, allowing users to further describe how they are feeling or list factors which may be having an impact on their emotions at the time an entry is logged. State of mind history can be viewed through the Health app, which can also be compared alongside physical health data. The Health app may also prompt a user suffering from regular unpleasant moods to complete standardized assessments for anxiety or depression, and suggest seeking professional help.

== See also ==
- Health (Apple)
