= Workouts (Apple) =

Fitness app for Apple Watch

- Workouts app in watchOS 26
- Developer: Apple
- Release: March 9, 2015; 11 years ago
- Operating system: watchOS
- Type: Physical fitness

Workouts is a fitness companion and activity recording application developed by Apple for Apple Watch devices, used to start workout tracking and view metrics while an exercise activity is in progress. The app was first introduced alongside watchOS 1 on April 24, 2015, and is tightly integrated into the operating system's health tracking features. All workout history and deeper workout metrics can be viewed from within the Fitness and Health apps on a connected iPhone.

== Overview ==
The workouts app displays a list of activities and exercises for a user to begin recording, although the watch is also capable of detecting when a workout session begins on its own and notifying a user to start a workout. During a workout, the app will display the time elapsed since recording of the chosen activity began, the user's current heart rate, and the active and total kilojoules burned during the workout. Other metrics can vary depending on the type of activity, such as displaying the total altitude of a cycling workout or the total laps of a swimming program. Additional metrics may also be displayed by connecting the watch to bluetooth-enabled third-party exercise machines or accessories using the GymKit API.

For water-based activities, the watch may ask for the length of the pool an activity is being conducted in, and will also set the device's water lock feature automatically once a workout has begun. During cycling activities, the workout can appear as a live activity on a connected iPhone, which can be used to display the workout metrics on a larger screen if the device is mounted to the bicycle.

Since watchOS 9, swiping up on the metrics display will show a user's heart rate zones, which are five calculated segments which indicate the intensity of a workout based on their maximum heart rate. Workout views can also be customised to display a range of metrics in order to suit a user's needs and preferences. Workouts can be paused or segmented for breaks and changes in activity, and media controls can be accessed within the app itself during a workout.

Workouts are displayed in different colours depending on the chosen goal - green for open activity, yellow for timed activities, blue for set distances, red for kilojoule targets, and purple for custom interval programs. The "Multisport" workout option allows users to switch between the indoor and outdoor versions of the swimming, cycling, and running activities in any order.

== Types of workouts ==
As of watchOS 10, the list of supported workout activities available for recording includes:

- Alpine Skiing
- Archery
- Athletics
- Aussie Rules
- Badminton
- Barre
- Baseball
- Basketball
- Bowling
- Boxing
- Climbing
- Cool Down
- Cricket
- Cross Training
- Cross-Country Skiing
- Curling
- Dance
- Disc Sports
- Elliptical
- Equestrian Sports
- Fencing
- Fishing
- Fitness Gaming
- Functional Strength Training
- Golf
- Gridiron
- Gymnastics
- Hand Cycling
- High Intensity Interval Training (HIIT)
- Hiking
- Hockey
- Hunting
- Indoor Cycle
- Indoor Run
- Indoor Walk
- Kickboxing
- Lacrosse
- Martial Arts
- Mind & Body
- Mixed Cardio
- Multisport*
- Open Water Swim*
- Outdoor Cycle
- Outdoor Run
- Outdoor Walk
- Paddlesports*
- Pickleball
- Pilates
- Play
- Pool Swim*
- Racquetball
- Rolling
- Rower
- Rugby
- Sailing*
- Skating
- Skipping Rope
- Snow Sports
- Snowboarding
- Soccer
- Social Dance
- Softball
- Squash
- Stairs
- Step Training
- Stepper
- Stretching
- Surfing*
- Table Tennis
- Tai Chi
- Tennis
- Traditional Strength Training
- Volleyball
- Water Fitness*
- Water Polo*
- Water Sports*
- Wheelchair Walk Pace**
- Wheelchair Run Pace**
- Wrestling
- Yoga
- Other Activity

*Indicates a water-based workout

**Only available to wheelchair users

== GymKit API ==
GymKit is an integration API that was launched with watchOS 4.1 on 31 October 2017, which allows developers and manufacturers to enable bidirectional sync between the Apple Watch and certain cardio equipment. Once paired, compatible machines can display workout data and performance during workouts and send additional data to the Fitness app.

== See also ==
- Fitness (Apple)
- Mindfulness (Apple)
- Health (Apple)
