= Journal (Apple) =

Journaling software developed by Apple

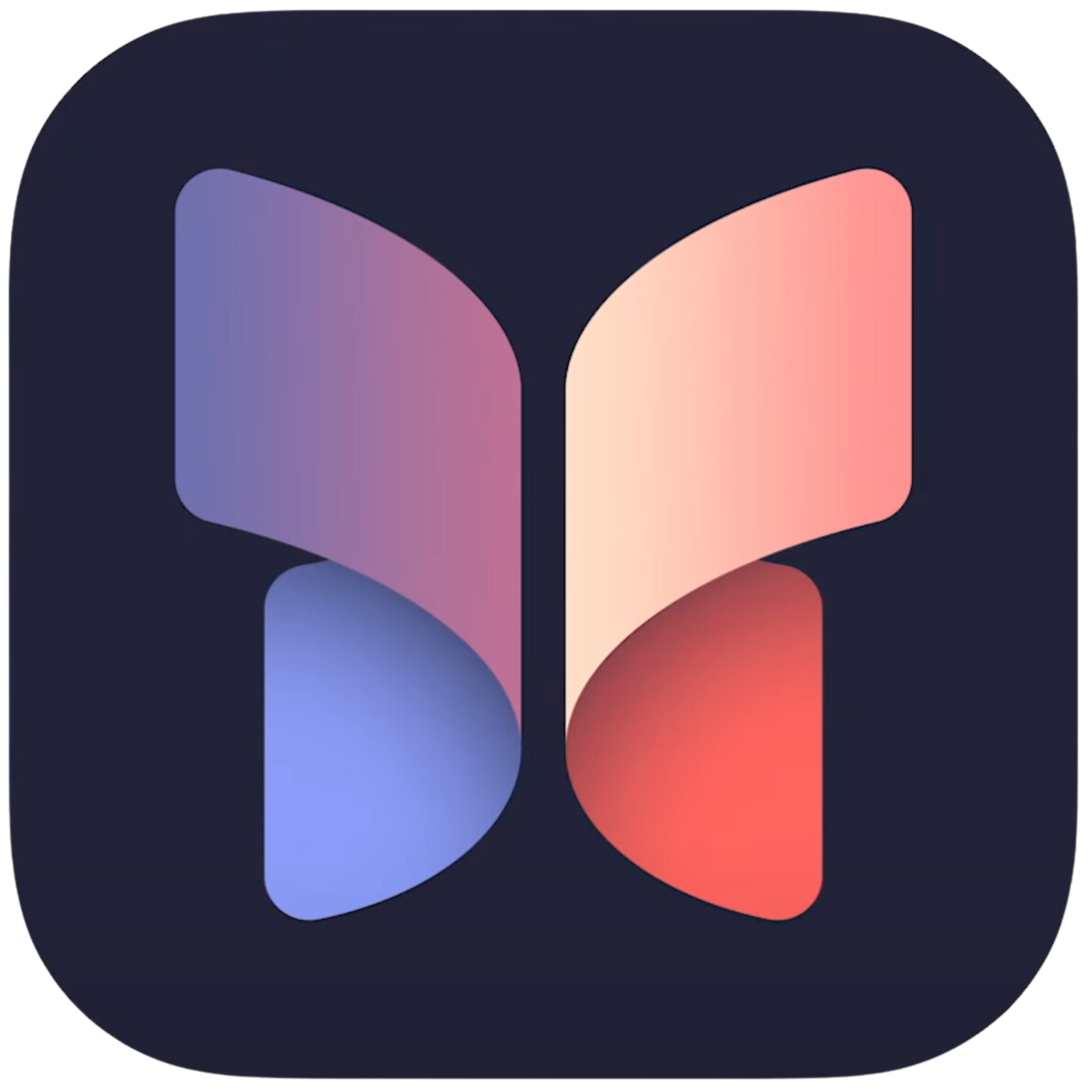

- Screenshot of Journal on an iPhone 14 Pro running iOS 26
- Developer: Apple Inc.
- Release: December 11, 2023; 2 years ago
- Operating system: iOS (17.2–) iPadOS (26.0-) macOS (26.0-)
- Platform: iPhone iPad iPad Mini iPad Air iPad Pro iMac; Mac Mini; Mac Studio; Mac Pro; MacBook Air; MacBook Pro; MacBook Neo
- Type: Journaling
- License: Proprietary

Journal is a personal journaling app developed by Apple Inc. for iPhones, first revealed during the 2023 Worldwide Developers Conference before officially being released on December 11, 2023, alongside iOS 17.2. The app encourages users to create journal entries in which they can record and reflect upon their thoughts and activities.

== Features ==
The app features a simple interface which displays all of a user's previous journal entries, alongside a plus button at the bottom of the screen to create a new entry. These entries can also be filtered by attachment type or bookmarked for faster look-up. When creating a new entry, Journal will provide a user with writing suggestions generated on-device based on their activity throughout the day by grouping data together, such as a prompt which includes a number of photos taken at a specific location, or one that includes a recorded workout as well as a playlist that was being listened to during the activity. The app can also suggest "reflection" prompts, which are statements or questions intended to inspire a user to begin writing.

A user can also manually attach data to a journal entry during writing, including support for photos, video, voice recordings, location tags, completed workouts, recent contacts, and music playlists amongst other info. Third-party developers can choose to integrate their own data into journaling suggestions, and an API allows for other third-party journaling apps to utilize the same on-device journaling suggestions.

Journal can be locked to prevent access from other users without a passcode or Face ID, and a journaling schedule can also be set which sends a notification out at a set time on chosen days to encourage consistent use.

An insights page was added to the app alongside iOS 18, which provides users with statistics on their journaling habits such as their longest streak, the amount of times a location has been visited, or the total number of words written across all journal entries.
