= Samsung Health =

Health-tracking app

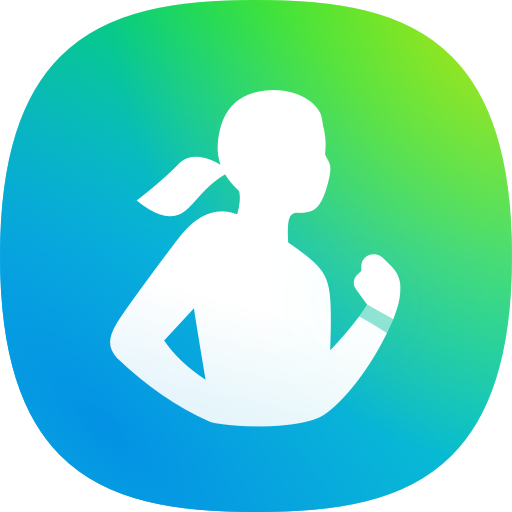
- icon used since One UI 7
- Original author: Samsung Electronics
- Developer: Samsung Electronics
- Stable release: 6.30.2.031 (Android); 1.14.4 (iOS) / 8 July 2025; 16 months ago (Android); 21 December 2020; 5 years ago (iOS)
- Operating system: Android 10 and Later, iOS 9 and later and Tizen (on smartwatches)
- Included with: Samsung Galaxy phones and watches
- Available in: 80 languages
- Website: www.samsung.com/us/apps/samsung-health/

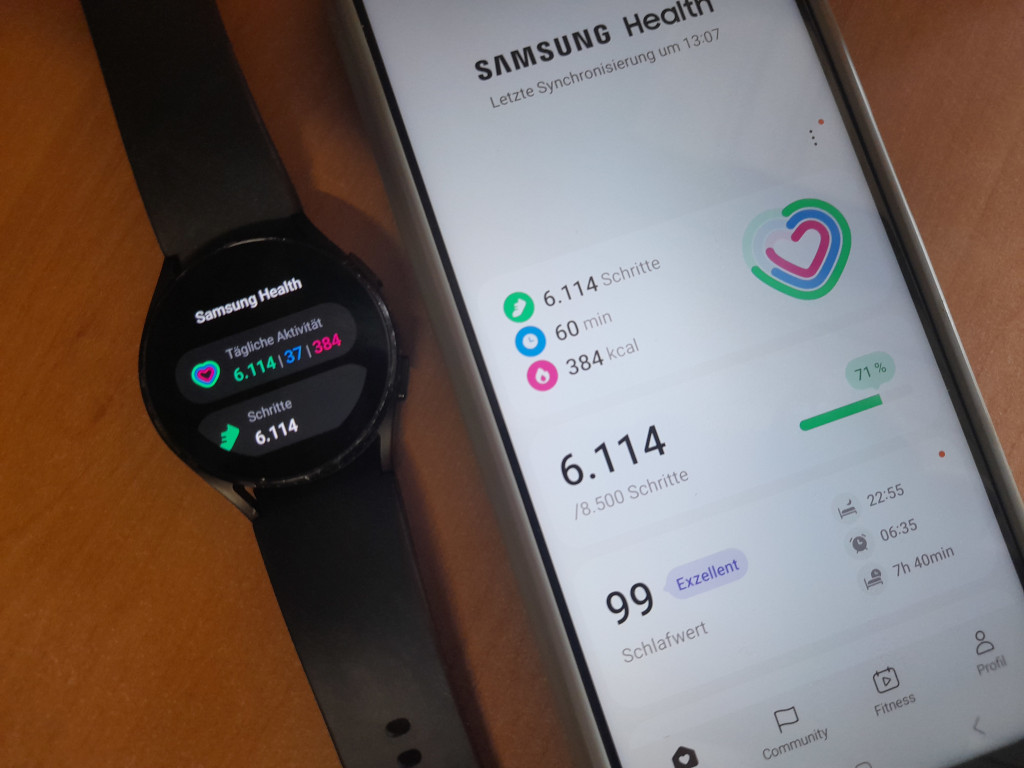
Samsung Health on a Smart Watch and a Smartphone

Samsung Health is a free application developed by Samsung Electronics that serves to track various aspects of daily life contributing to well being such as physical activity, diet, and sleep.

Launched on 2 July 2012, with the then new Samsung flagship smartphone, the Galaxy S3, the application was installed by default only on some smartphones of the brand. It can also be downloaded from the Samsung Galaxy Store and Google Play Store.

== History ==
Since mid-September 2015, the application is available to all Android users. From 2 October 2017, the app is available for iPhones from iOS 9.0.

The application is installed by default on some Samsung smartphone models and can not be removed without root. It is possible to disable this application.

The app changed its name from S Health to Samsung Health on 4 April 2017, when it released version 5.7.1.

== Dashboard ==
The dashboard is the main display of the application. This is the main novelty introduced during the redesign of the application in April 2015 in version 4.1.0. The table shows on one page, a general overview of the most recent data saved. In addition, it provides direct access to each feature. Its composition and layout are customizable.

== Features ==
Some features are tracked by testing with phone sensors or phone accessories (Fitbit, Galaxy Active, Galaxy Fit, etc.), and some features are tracked by user input (food/calories, weight, water amount, etc.).

=== Main features ===
- Setting goals or using the goals suggested by the app to improve its results
- Pedometer
- Weekly summaries of the main features
- Activity tracking taking into account market and sports sessions
- Dietary monitoring (calories and nutrients absorbed)
- Weight tracking
- Sleep monitoring

=== Other features ===
- Ratings of the number of steps in different groups (all users, age group or friends)
- Global challenges
- Creating challenges on the number of steps
- Measurement of heart rate via dedicated hardware
- Monitoring of water consumption
- Monitoring of blood sugar
- Measurement of blood oxygen saturation (SpO_{2}) by Pulse oximetry via dedicated hardware
- Stress monitoring/measurement

=== Heart rate measurement ===
The availability of the heart rate measurement function coincides with the release of the Samsung Galaxy S5 which has a built-in sensor. This function is limited to take the measurement punctually and at rest. The same sensor is made to also measure Pulse oximetry and stress levels.

The app also collects and displays values from Samsung Galaxy Watches.

The application also supports heart sensors from other manufacturers. It is able to generate a graph as a function of time of the different frequencies reached during a sports session as well as other information such as the average and maximum heart rate reached.

On Samsung Galaxy S5 / S5 Neo / S6 / S7 / S8 / S9 / S10 and Edge versions as well as Galaxy Note 4 / 5 / 7 / FE / 8, the application can measure the heart rate with the sensor on the back of the device. The heart rate measurement feature is not supported on Samsung Note 10's and Galaxy S10e's.

=== Pedometer ===
Step counting is a feature that is integrated with Samsung Health with the arrival of the Samsung Galaxy S4 in April 2013.

The default goal is to reach 10,000 steps per day. This number would be a recommendation of the World Health Organization according to the French Federation of Cardiology.

The app also calculates other data such as the distance traveled, the number of calories burned and the number of steps taken at a good pace. According to the application information, a good rhythm is obtained when a rate of at least 100 steps per minute is maintained for ten minutes.

At the visual level, we can use the data with different graphics:

- On a 24-hour day with a histogram showing activity (number of steps) in 24-minute increments (60 slices of 24 minutes in one day)
- Daily, weekly and monthly trends showing the average number of daily steps taken.

User can choose the source of the recorded data. Either we use the smartphone data or those recorded by a compatible Samsung accessory.

=== Daily activity ===
This function measures the daily activity expressed in minutes. By default the application automatically calculates the running time (more than one hundred steps per minute). The goal to reach is set by default at sixty minutes a day.

User can manually record an activity session (running, walking, hiking, biking). Specific parameters such as distance, duration, route layout, altitude profile, heart rate, calories burned will be recorded according to the chosen activity.

Samsung health app strengthens the social bond among like-minded individuals, developing a cooperative community and on the whole, enhancing the fitness experience.

=== Global challenges ===
Global challenges were added at the end of May 2017 in version 5.9.0.029. Global challenges last one month and the goal is to walk 200,000 steps. If a user has reached the goal by the end of the month, the app will award them the badge. Each challenge features an animal that "gives" a variety of information.

This table lists all global challenges:

Month and year	Name	Animal(s)
June 2017	Broccoli	fox
July 2017	Tomato	meerkat
August 2017	Avocado	koala
September 2017	Beach	turtle
October 2017	Green tea	panda
November 2017	Moonlight	owl
December 2017	Snow	polar bear
January 2018	Igloo	penguins
February 2018	Spa	monkeys/orangutans
March 2018	Jungle	parrots
April 2018	Desert	
May 2018	Lavender	deer
June 2018	Broccoli	fox
July 2018	Beach	turtle
August 2018	Green tea	panda
September 2018	Tomato	meerkat
October 2017	Moonlight	owl
November 2018	Avocado	koala
December 2018	Snow	polar bear

In the coming years, global challenges are taking place in the same order as in 2018.

=== Health Assistant ===
In July 2026, Samsung introduced Health Assistant, an AI powered feature within Samsung Health billed as its first fully integrated AI personal health assistant. It will draw data from the app's five wellness pillars, sleep, activity, nutrition, mindfulness, and vitals, to generate personalized insights and let users ask questions about their health. Samsung said the recommendations are validated by physicians and certified health coaches, and the feature pulls in data from a user's Galaxy phone, smartwatch, or smart ring.

== See also ==
- Apple Health
- Google Fit
