= TvOS =

Operating system for the Apple TV

tvOS
- Developer: Apple
- Written in: ASM; C; C++; Objective-C; Swift
- OS family: Unix-like; BSD
- Working state: Current
- Source model: Closed, with open-source components
- Initial release: January 9, 2007; 19 years ago as Apple TV Software; October 29, 2015; 11 years ago as tvOS
- Latest release: 27.2.1 (November 13, 2026; 3 days ago) [±]
- Latest preview: 27.3 beta / November 3, 2026; 13 days ago
- Marketing target: Television, casual gaming
- Available in: 71 languages
- List of languages Bahasa Indonesia, Bahasa Melayu, Català, Čeština, Dansk, Deutsch (Deutschland), Deutsch (Österreich), Deutsch (Schweiz), English (Australia), English (Canada), English (India), English (Ireland), English (New Zealand), English (Singapore), English (South Africa), English (United Kingdom), English (United States), Español (Argentina), Español (Bolivia), Español (Chile), Español (Colombia), Español (Costa Rica), Español (Ecuador), Español (El Salvador), Español (España), Español (Estados Unidos), Español (Guatemala), Español (Honduras), Español (Latinoamérica), Español (México), Español (Nicaragua), Español (Panamá), Español (Paraguay), Español (Perú), Español (Puerto Rico), Español (República Dominicana), Español (Uruguay), Español (Venezuela), Français (Belgique), Français (Canada), Français (France), Français (Suisse), Hrvatski, Italiano (Italia), Italiano (Svizzera), Magyar, Nederlands (België), Nederlands (Nederland), Norsk bokmål, Polski, Português (Brasil), Português (Portugal), Română, Slovenčina, Suomi, Svenska, Tiếng Việt, Türkçe, Ελληνικά, Русский, Українська, עברית, العربية, हिंदी, ภาษาไทย, 한국어, 日本語, 简体中文, 繁體中文 (台灣), 繁體中文 (澳門), 繁體中文 (香港)
- Update method: Firmware-over-the-air
- Supported platforms: ARMv8-A (9.0–); ARMv7-A (4.0–7.9); x86 (1.0-3.0.2)
- Kernel type: Hybrid (XNU)
- Default user interface: 10-foot user interface
- License: Commercial proprietary software
- Official website: developer.apple.com/tvos

Support status
- Supported

tvOS (formerly Apple TV Software) is an operating system created and developed by Apple for the Apple TV, a digital media player. In the first-generation Apple TV, Apple TV software is based on Mac OS X. The software for the second-generation and later Apple TVs is based on the iOS operating system and has many similar frameworks, technologies, and concepts.

The second- and third-generation Apple TV have several built-in applications, but do not support third-party applications.

On September 9, 2015, Apple announced the fourth-generation Apple TV, with support for third-party applications. Apple also changed the name of the Apple TV operating system to tvOS, adopting the camel case nomenclature that they were using for its other operating systems: iOS, watchOS, and (later, in 2016) macOS.

The latest version, tvOS 27, was released on September 14, 2026.

== History ==
On October 30, 2015, the fourth-generation Apple TV was released and shipped with tvOS 9.0. On November 9, 2015, tvOS 9.0.1 was released, primarily to address minor issues.

tvOS 9.1 was released on December 8, 2015, along with OS X 10.11.2, iOS 9.2, and watchOS 2.1. Apple also updated the Remote apps on iOS and watchOS, enabling basic remote functionality for the fourth-generation Apple TV (previously, the app only worked with earlier Apple TV models).

On November 25, 2015, Facebook debuted their SDK for tvOS, allowing applications to log into Facebook, share to Facebook, and use Facebook Analytics in the same way that iOS applications can.

On December 2, 2015, Twitter debuted their login authentication service for tvOS – "Digits" – allowing users to log into apps and services with a simple, unique code available online.

On June 13, 2016, at WWDC 2016, tvOS 10 was announced. It brought new functionality, such as Siri search improvements, single sign-on for cable subscriptions, a dark mode, and a new Remote application for controlling Apple TV. It was released on September 13, 2016, along with iOS 10.

On June 4, 2018, at WWDC 2018, tvOS 12 was announced. It brought support for Dolby Atmos E-AC3 and was released on September 17, 2018, along with iOS 12.

On April 13, 2020, it was discovered that the HomePod had switched from running a variant of iOS to a variant of tvOS.

On June 22, 2020, at WWDC 2020, tvOS 14 was announced. It brought support for the Apple Home shortcuts in Control Center and 4K videos on YouTube. It was released on September 16, 2020, along with iOS 14 and iPadOS 14.

On June 7, 2021, at WWDC 2021, tvOS 15 was announced. It brought new features and improvements, including SharePlay, a "Shared with You" section in the TV app, and the ability to play content via voice command. It was released on September 20, 2021, along with iOS 15 and iPadOS 15.

On June 6, 2022, at WWDC 2022, tvOS 16 was announced. It brought support for Nintendo Switch's Joy-Con and Pro Controllers and additional Bluetooth and USB game controllers. It was released on September 12, 2022, along with iOS 16.

On June 5, 2023, at WWDC 2023, tvOS 17 was announced. tvOS 17 introduced FaceTime and support for other video conferencing apps for the second and third generation Apple TV 4K when paired with an iPhone or iPad, a redesigned control center interface, and third-party VPN support. It was released on September 18, 2023, along with iOS 17 and iPadOS 17.

On June 10, 2024, at WWDC 2024, tvOS 18 was announced. It was released on September 16, 2024, along with iOS 18 and iPadOS 18.

On June 9, 2025, at WWDC 2025, tvOS 26 was announced, which used a new year-based numbering system. It introduced the Liquid Glass user interface design to the second and third generation Apple TV 4K. It was released on September 15, 2025, along with iOS 26 and iPadOS 26. tvOS 26 was the last version to support the Apple TV HD and 4K (first generation). The Apple TV HD is the longest supported Apple device ever, having supported 11 major tvOS versions over ten years.

On June 8, 2026, at WWDC 2026, tvOS 27 was announced.

== Features ==
tvOS 9 shipped with several new features on the fourth-generation Apple TV. A new feature introduced was the ability to move through the interface with the new touchpad remote using multi-touch gestures. It also introduced a new App Store in which users can download and install new applications (such as apps and games) made available by developers for the Apple TV and tvOS.

tvOS supports Siri, which offers features such as cross-application search for media, rewind, fast forward, name and actor/director of the current movie, and skip back 15 seconds.

tvOS supports an application switcher on the Apple TV, application customization options, cinematic screensavers, and control of the TV using the included Siri Remote with the built-in support for HDMI-CEC in tvOS.

tvOS allows the user to control the Apple TV in different ways, such as using the included Siri Remote, pairing a third-party universal remote, pairing an MFi Gamepad to control games, using the Remote app on iOS, watchOS, or iPadOS, and pairing a Bluetooth keyboard.

== Accessibility ==
tvOS, derived from iOS, incorporates many of the accessibility features found in iOS and macOS. These include VoiceOver, Zoom, and Siri, which support users who are blind or have low vision. VoiceOver, a screen reader available in over 30 languages, provides spoken descriptions of on-screen content and supports navigation through gestures such as flicks, taps, and the rotor.

The system includes options to increase screen contrast by reducing background transparency in various interface elements. A high-contrast cursor can be enabled to highlight focused content, and a Reduce Motion setting simplifies certain animations to minimize visual strain.

tvOS supports audio descriptions for films, indicated by the AD (Audio Description) icon in the iTunes Store and in iTunes on macOS and Windows.

Bluetooth keyboard support is also available. When used with VoiceOver, characters are read aloud as they are typed and confirmed. While designed for Apple's keyboards, the system is compatible with most third-party Bluetooth keyboards.

Closed captioning and SDH (Subtitles for the Deaf or Hard-of-Hearing) are supported for video content, with customizable caption styles and fonts. Compatible media is marked with CC or SDH icons in the iTunes Store.

The Siri Remote allows for customization of the touch surface, including tracking speed adjustments and the option to disable the touch functionality entirely in second-generation or later models, using directional buttons instead.

Apple's Remote app for iOS devices can also control Apple TV. It includes support for Switch Control, which enables users with motor impairments to navigate the interface using compatible switch devices.

== Development ==
tvOS 9 shipped with all-new development tools for developers, adding support for a new SDK for developers to build apps for the TV including all of the APIs included in iOS 9 such as Metal. It also adds the tvOS App Store which allows users to browse, download, and install a wide variety of applications. In addition, developers can now use their own interface inside of their application rather than only being able to use Apple's interface. Since tvOS is based on iOS, it is easy to port existing iOS apps to the Apple TV with Xcode while making only a few refinements to the app to better suit the larger screen. Apple provides Xcode free to all registered Apple developers. To develop for the new Apple TV, it is necessary to make a parallax image for the application icon. In order to do this, Apple provides a Parallax exporter and previewer in the development tools for the Apple TV.

== Version history ==
=== Overview ===
Overview of tvOS versions
| Version | Initial release date | Latest version | Latest release date | Device end-of-life |
|---|---|---|---|---|
| Apple TV Software 1 | March 21, 2007 | 1.1 | June 20, 2007 | —N/a |
| Apple TV Software 2 | February 12, 2008 | 2.4 | June 24, 2009 | —N/a |
| Apple TV Software 3 | October 29, 2009 | 3.0.2 | February 10, 2010 | 1st |
| Apple TV Software 4 | September 1, 2010 | 4.4.4 | December 15, 2011 | —N/a |
| Apple TV Software 5 | March 7, 2012 | 5.3 | June 19, 2013 | —N/a |
| Apple TV Software 6 | September 23, 2013 | 6.2.1 | September 17, 2014 | 2nd |
| Apple TV Software 7 | September 17, 2014 | 7.9 | March 14, 2022 | 3rd |
| tvOS 9 | October 29, 2015 | 9.2.2 | July 18, 2016 | —N/a |
| tvOS 10 | September 13, 2016 | 10.2.2 | July 19, 2017 | —N/a |
| tvOS 11 | September 19, 2017 | 11.4.1 | July 9, 2018 | —N/a |
| tvOS 12 | September 17, 2018 | 12.4.1 | August 26, 2019 | —N/a |
| tvOS 13 | September 24, 2019 | 13.4.8 | July 15, 2020 | —N/a |
| tvOS 14 | September 16, 2020 | 14.7 | July 19, 2021 | —N/a |
| tvOS 15 | September 20, 2021 | 15.6 | July 20, 2022 | —N/a |
| tvOS 16 | September 12, 2022 | 16.6 | July 24, 2023 | —N/a |
| tvOS 17 | September 18, 2023 | 17.6.1 | August 19, 2024 | —N/a |
| tvOS 18 | September 16, 2024 | 18.6 | July 29, 2025 | —N/a |
| tvOS 26 | September 15, 2025 | 26.6.1 | October 26, 2026 | HD, 4K (1st) |
| tvOS 27 | September 14, 2026 | 27.2.1 | November 13, 2026 | TBA |
Legend: Unsupported Supported Latest version Preview version

Information about software updates for Apple TV (2nd generation) onwards is published on Apple's support website.

=== Apple TV Software 1.0 ===
Apple TV software 1.0 presented the user with an interface similar to that of Front Row. Like Front Row on the Mac, it presents the user with seven options for consuming content. Movies, TV Shows, Music, Podcasts, Photos, Settings, and Sources. It was a modified version of Mac OS X 10.4 Tiger.

=== Apple TV Software 2.0 ===
In February 2008, Apple released a major and free upgrade to the Apple TV, labelled "Take Two" (2.0). This update did away with Front Row and introduced a new interface in which content was organized into six categories, all of which appeared in a large square box on the screen upon startup (movies, TV shows, music, YouTube, podcasts, and photos) and presented in the initial menu, along with a "Settings" option for configuration, including software updates. It also made updates over the air, meaning the computer was no longer required.

=== Apple TV Software 3.0 ===
In October 2009, Apple released another update for the Apple TV called "Apple TV Software 3.0". This update replaced the interface in version 2.0 with a new interface which presented seven horizontal columns across the top of the screen for the different categories of content (Movies, TV Shows, Music, Podcasts, Photos, Internet, and Settings). This update also added features such as content filtering, iTunes Extras, new fonts, and a new Internet radio app. One new feature in particular was the 'Genius' playlist option allowing for easier and more user friendly playlist creating. The final update for the Apple TV (1st Generation) was Apple TV Software 3.0.2, released February 10, 2010.

=== Apple TV Software 4 ===
Apple TV Software 4, based on iOS 4 and 5, was the first version of Apple TV Software available on the Apple TV (2nd generation). It ended support for the Apple TV (1st generation). Apple TV Software 4.4 brought My Photo Stream, AirPlay mirroring (from iPhone 4S and iPad 2), NHL, Wall Street Journal, slideshow themes and Netflix subtitles. Contrary to rumors and code found in iOS 5, the release did not bring support for Bluetooth or apps to the Apple TV (2nd generation).

Apple TV Software 4 version history
| Apple TV Software | Build | Release date | Features |
|---|---|---|---|
| 4.0 | 8M89 (1493) | September 1, 2010 | Initial release on Apple TV (2nd generation) |
| 4.1 | 8C150 (1539) | November 22, 2010 | AirPlay support.; VoiceOver in menus.; Bug fixes. |
| 4.1.1 | 8C154 (1553) | December 14, 2010 | Bug fixes: Addresses an issue that causes some high-definition TVs to incorrectly display at 480p.; Addresses an issue that may cause a movie or TV show to be re-downloaded. |
| 4.2 | 8F191m (2060) | March 9, 2011 | AirPlay video support for third-party apps on iDevices.; New slideshow themes: View photos with the new Scrapbook, Photo Mobile, and Holiday Mobile slideshow themes.; Improved on-screen keyboard: Search and enter names and passwords more easily with the redesigned on-screen keyboard.; Dolby Digital 5.1 surround sound with Netflix |
| 4.2.1 | 8F202 (2100) | March 22, 2011 | Bug fixes: Addresses issues that may cause the screen to flicker or display incorrect colour on some older TVs.; Addresses an issue where Apple TV may not wake up from sleep.; Addresses an issue where audio may not be heard on some TV models after switching from another input.; Apple TV Software 4.2.1 includes stability and performance fixes for Apple TV. |
| 4.2.2 | 8F305 (2203) | May 11, 2011 | Bug fixes: Addresses an issue in which audio is not output when playing some video content.; Addresses an issue in which video is not displayed when playing some content.; Adds an audio output setting for switching to 16-bit audio for compatibility with some TVs and AV receivers.; Improves the performance of fast-forwarding and rewinding live events.; Addresses an issue in which the description information is not displayed for some movies.; Addresses an issue in which YouTube subscription videos are not ordered by date. |
| 4.3 | 8F455 (2557) | August 1, 2011 | Ability to watch videos from Vimeo.; US-only feature: streams purchased TV shows from iTunes on Apple TV (and past purchases); formerly, only rentals were available. |
| 4.4 | 9A334v (3140) | October 12, 2011 | Coincides with iOS 5 for portable iOS devices.; Photo Stream.; AirPlay mirroring for iPad 2 and iPhone 4S.; Wall Street Journal.; New Slideshow themes.; Netflix subtitles.; Upgrading from this version resets the device to factory settings as part of the upgrade process. |
| 4.4.1 | 9A335a (3150) | October 17, 2011 | Bug fixes: Upgrading from this version resets the device to factory settings as part of the upgrade process. |
| 4.4.2 | 9A336a (3160) | October 24, 2011 | Audio playback: addresses an issue in which audio is not output when playing some video content.; Video playback: addresses an issue in which video is not displayed when playing some content.; Audio output setting: adds an audio output setting for switching to 16-bit audio for compatibility with some TVs and AV receivers.; Live FF/RW improvements: improves the performance of fast-forwarding and rewinding live events.; Movie description: addresses an issue in which the description information is not displayed for some movies.; YouTube video order: addresses an issue in which YouTube subscription videos were not ordered by date. |
| 4.4.3 | 9A405l (3323) | November 17, 2011 | Added support for Netflix in Mexico.; Addresses an issue in which audio may not play through the optical port when the TV is turned off. |
| 4.4.4 | 9A406a (3330) | December 15, 2011 | General performance and stability improvements, including a fix for an issue that displayed an error when playing some video content. |

=== Apple TV Software 5 ===
On September 24, 2012, Apple TV (2nd generation) onwards received the Apple TV Software 5 software update, based on iOS 5 and 6, with Shared Photo Streams, iTunes account switching, better AirPlay functionality, and Trailers searching, among other smaller improvements.

Apple TV Software 5 version history
| Apple TV Software | Build | Release date | Features |
|---|---|---|---|
| 5.0 | 9B179b (4099) | March 7, 2012 | Initial release on Apple TV (3rd generation).; Support for 1080p video resolution.^{A3}; Completely redesigned menus.; Content categories now resemble iOS app icons.; Third-party apps (Netflix, YouTube, NBA, Flickr, etc.) have their own icon.; Ability to create a Netflix account. |
| 5.0.1 | 9B206f (4224) | May 10, 2012 | Previews for movies and TV shows from the iTunes Store can now be viewed in HD.; Fixes an issue that caused some iOS apps to have trouble connecting via AirPlay.; Improves the reliability of Home Sharing connections.; Addresses an issue affecting Netflix login and navigation.; Includes fixes for issues affecting stability and performance. |
| 5.0.2 | 9B830 (4250) | June 5, 2012 | Addresses an issue which caused content restrictions to be incorrectly applied for the iTunes Store in Australia. |
| 5.1 | 10A406E (5201) | September 24, 2012 | Shared Photo Streams: Accept invitations for Shared Photo Streams, browse photos and comments, and receive notifications of new content.; AirPlay: Send audio content from Apple TV to AirPlay-enabled speakers/devices (including AirPort Express and other Apple TVs). Also includes the ability to require an onscreen code to use AirPlay with Apple TV.; iTunes account switching: Save multiple iTunes accounts and switch quickly between them.; Trailers: Search for movie trailers. In the United States, see show times for local theaters.; Screen savers: New Cascade, Shrinking Tiles, and Sliding Panels screen savers.; Main menu: Reorder icons on the second page by holding down the select button on the remote.; Subtitles: SDH support for the hearing-impaired; improvements to viewing and selecting subtitles.; Network configuration: Support for setting up advanced network options using configuration profiles.; Stability and performance: Includes general performance and stability improvements. |
| 5.1.1 | 10A831 (5433) | November 29, 2012 | Adds support for Up Next with iTunes 11 or iTunes Match.; Includes performance and stability improvements with the iTunes Store, AirPlay, Netflix, iTunes Match, and wired Ethernet connections. |
| 5.2 | 10B144b (6010.96) | January 28, 2013 | Initial release on Apple TV (3rd generation Revision A).; Bluetooth keyboards: Adds support for some Bluetooth keyboards (including Apple Wireless Keyboard).; iTunes in the Cloud: Browse and play purchased iTunes music directly from iCloud.; Airplay: Send stereo audio from video content on Apple TV to AirPlay-enabled speakers/devices (including AirPort Express and other Apple TVs).; Stability and performance: Includes general performance and stability improvements. |
| 5.2.1 | 10B329a (6025) | March 19, 2013 | Hulu Plus app: Completely redesigned, adds support for closed-captioning.; iTunes in the Cloud: Adds support for Music in the Cloud in Japan and Israel.; Stability and performance: Including improvements for software update, subtitles, and general performance.; Security Fixes. |
| 5.3 | 10B809 (6105) | June 19, 2013 | Third-party content: Adds support for Crunchyroll, ESPN, HBO GO, Qello, and Sky News (some sources depend on country).; iTunes Store: Improves reliability of signing into the iTunes Store and playing purchased content.; Further channels added on August 27, 2013, without a software update: Vevo, Weather Channel, Disney Channel, Disney XD, and Smithsonian Channel (some sources depend on country) |

=== Apple TV Software 6 ===
On September 20, 2013, Apple TV (second generation) onwards received the Apple TV Software 6 software update, based on iOS 7, with iTunes Radio and AirPlay from iCloud.

Apple TV Software 6 version history
| Apple TV Software | Build | Release date | Features |
|---|---|---|---|
| 6.0 | 11A470e/11A502 | September 23, 2013 | iTunes Radio; Create user radio stations and listen to them ad-free with iTunes Match (United States and Australia only).; iTunes Store; Browse, purchase, and play music directly from the iTunes Store.; iCloud Photos; Adds support to play video from a shared Photo Stream and view Photo Streams from multiple contributors.; AirPlay from iCloud; Apple TV will play content from iTunes In The Cloud instead of user AirPlay device when possible (needs iOS 7 on AirPlay device).; Podcasts; Sync user podcasts and podcast stations across Apple TV and all user iOS devices.; iMovie Theater; Stream user iMovie creations instantly in high definition from iCloud (needs latest version of iMovie for iOS or Mac and an iCloud account).; Subtitles & Captioning; Automatic subtitle selection based on Apple TV language setting, with customizable closed caption style.; Conference Room Display; Lock Apple TV into Conference Room Display (for business and education environments) and show onscreen instructions for using AirPlay.; Software update; Keep Apple TV always updated by automatically installing software updates when available.; Setup; Use an iPhone, iPad, or iPod Touch with iOS 7 to automatically transfer network settings, user Apple ID, and language preferences to Apple TV (3rd generation) (not available on iPhone 4 or iPad 2).; Third-party US-only content added on September 26, 2013, without a software update: Major League Soccer (MLS) and Disney Junior. iMovie Theater app was added on October 22, 2013, without a software update. |
| 6.0.1 | 11B511d | October 25, 2013 | Stability and performance; Includes general performance and stability improvements. |
| 6.0.2 | 11B554a/11B651 | November 14, 2013 | Stability and performance; Includes general performance and stability improvements.; Security (11B651 build only); Provides a fix for SSL connection verification. |
| 6.1 | 11D169b | March 10, 2014 | Main menu; Includes ability to make hiding channels easier; AirPlay; Security option for iOS devices or Macs to require verifying via a one-time, onscreen code before using AirPlay (needs iOS 7.1 or later on an iOS device, or OS X 10.9.2 or later on a Mac).; Adds support to allow an AirPlay device to discover Apple TV over Bluetooth in environments where multicast or Bonjour traffic is blocked on the network or the AirPlay device is on a different subnet.; Remote app; View purchased TV Shows and Movies in the Remote app and tap to play them instantly on Apple TV.; Create and play iTunes Radio stations (needs Remote app version 4.2 or later).; Stability and performance; Bug fixes, general performance and stability improvements. |
| 6.1.1 | 11D201c | April 22, 2014 | Stability and performance; Includes general performance and stability improvements. |
| 6.2 | 11D257c | June 30, 2014 | Stability and performance; Includes general performance and stability improvements.; iTunes Extras; Added ability to explore deleted scenes, photos, cast and crew, and more with select iTunes movie purchases. (Only available for HD purchases) |
| 6.2.1 | 11D258 | September 17, 2014 | Final release on Apple TV (2nd generation) As of May 2015, the YouTube app only works on newer Apple TVs that have software 7.2 or later due to an API change implemented by Google.: Stability and performance; Includes general performance and stability improvements. |

=== Apple TV Software 7 ===
On September 18, 2014, the third generation Apple TV received the Apple TV Software 7.0 software update based on iOS 8, with a redesigned UI, Family Sharing and peer-to-peer AirPlay. This release dropped support for the second generation Apple TV.

Apple TV Software 7 version history
| Apple TV Software | Build | Release date | Features |
|---|---|---|---|
| 7.0 | 12A365b | September 17, 2014 | UI; Redesigned UI that adopts a similar look to the "flat" look that is presented in iOS 8 and OS X Yosemite.; UI redesign includes redesigned icons and borders, menus, and many of the controls inside many of the apps that are included with the Apple TV.; Family Sharing; Adds support for a service of sharing purchases from iTunes between up to 6 people.; Supports iTunes music, video, podcasts, and TV show purchases.; All group members must pay for family purchases with the same credit/debit card.; Ask To Buy – parents can approve a child's spending from the parent's device.; Descriptive Video Services; Hear descriptive video with a new accessibility feature support select iTunes movies and TV shows.; Peer-to-peer AirPlay; Guests can AirPlay from their Mac or iOS device directly to an Apple TV without connecting to a wireless network (needs ATV 3 Rev-A (A1469), iPhone 4S and later; iPad 2 and later; and iPod Touch (5th generation) running iOS 8 or a Mac running OS X Yosemite (10.10) or later).^{A3R}; Beats Music; Beats Music has now been shut down in favor of Apple Music, which requires an Apple TV 4 running tvOS 9.0 or later. |
| 7.0.1 | 12B410a | October 20, 2014 | Stability and performance; Includes general performance and stability improvements.; Bug fixes. |
| 7.0.2 | 12B435 | November 17, 2014 | Stability and performance; Includes general performance and stability improvements.; Bug fixes. |
| 7.0.3 | 12B466 | January 27, 2015 | Stability and performance; Includes general performance and stability improvements.; Bug fixes. |
| 7.1 | 12D508 | March 9, 2015 | Stability and performance; Includes general performance and stability improvements.; Bug fixes. |
| 7.2 | 12F69 | April 8, 2015 | As of May 2015, the YouTube app only works on Apple TVs that have software 7.2 or later due to an API change implemented by Google.: Stability and performance; Includes general performance and stability improvements.; Bug fixes |
| 7.2.1 | 12H523 | February 25, 2016 | Stability and performance; Includes general performance and stability improvements.; Bug fixes |
| 7.2.2 | 12H606 | December 12, 2016 | Stability and performance; Includes general performance and stability improvements.; Bug fixes; Amazon Video was automatically added to Apple TVs running 7.2.2 on December 6, 2017. |
| 7.3 | 12H847 | May 13, 2019 | Apple TV Software 7.3 brings the updated TV app to provide support for Apple TV+ services. |
| 7.3.1 | 12H864 | July 22, 2019 | Bug fixes and stability improvements |
| 7.4 | 12H876 | September 24, 2019 | Bug fixes and stability improvements |
| 7.5 | 12H885 | March 24, 2020 | Adds the ability to control the Apple TV from the control center of an iOS device, bug fixes and stability improvements. |
| 7.6 | 12H903 | September 16, 2020 | Bug fixes and stability improvements |
| 7.6.2 | 12H914 | December 14, 2020 | Bug fixes and stability improvements |
| 7.7 | 12H923 | April 26, 2021 | Bug fixes and stability improvements |
| 7.8 | 12H937 | September 20, 2021 | Bug fixes and stability improvements |
| 7.9 | 12H1006 | March 14, 2022 | Final release on Apple TV (3rd generation) Bug fixes and/or stability improvements |

=== tvOS 9 ===
tvOS 9 is based on iOS 9, with adaptations made for a television interface. It was announced on September 9, 2015, alongside the first-generation iPad Pro and the iPhone 6S. Tim Cook introduced tvOS, calling it a modern OS with support for apps. It was only available on the Apple TV HD, released in October 2015. It adds a native SDK to develop apps, an App Store to distribute them, Siri, and universal search across multiple apps. It dropped support for the third-generation Apple TV.

tvOS 9 version history
| tvOS version | Build | Release date | Features |
|---|---|---|---|
| 9.0 | 13T396 | October 29, 2015 | Initial release on Apple TV HD.: User interface; Introduces a new user interface that uses lighter colors and transparency, adds support for control via an all new remote. This remote can be used to navigate the user interface by using multi-touch gestures on the trackpad on the remote rather than physical buttons.; App Store/SDK; Adds support for an all new SDK for developers to build apps for the TV including all of the APIs included in iOS 9 such as Metal.; Adds an App Store which allows users to browse, download, and install a wide variety of applications from things such as games, video applications, etc.; Developers can now use their own interface inside of their application rather than only being able to use Apple's interface.; Siri; Adds support for Siri which can be toggled by pressing the microphone button on the remote.; Siri, beyond all of its iOS abilities, can take many voice commands tailored for the TV, such as a cross-application search for a movie/TV show, rewind, fast forward, name and actor/director of the current movie, and even skip back 15 seconds.; Experience; It is now possible to switch between two applications by double-clicking the trackpad on the remote and scrolling to the desired application.; Users can now customize the home screen by placing any applications they wish on the top row, including third-party types.; New cinematic screen savers display time-lapse images of scenic cities when the Apple TV is asleep.; It is now possible to control the volume of the TV and turn it on/off using just the new Siri Remote and the built in support for HDMI CEC in tvOS.; Third-party controllers; Adds support for pairing third-party Bluetooth game controllers in order to play games.; Apple Music; Adds Apple Music support for Apple TV. |
| 9.0.1 | 13T402 | November 9, 2015 | General performance and stability improvements. |
| 9.1 | 13U85 | December 8, 2015 | Adds support for controlling Apple Music with Siri.; Adds support for controlling the Apple TV with the Remote app for iOS and Apple Watch.; Improvements to networking and scrolling. |
| 9.1.1 | 13U717 | January 25, 2016 | General performance and stability improvements; Adds the Podcasts app to the Apple TV |
| 9.2 | 13Y234 | March 21, 2016 | Adds support for folders on the Apple TV.; A folder can be made by selecting an app, clicking and holding on the touchpad, clicking the Play/Pause button, and then choosing "New Folder" from the popup menu.; Adds the ability to pair Bluetooth keyboards; Adds a redesigned application switcher similar to the one found in iOS 9 rather than the one found in iOS 8 as tvOS 9.1 contained.; Adds support for iCloud Photo Library and Live Photos; Enables developers to add maps to their applications with the use of the MapKit API.; Siri/Voice dictation; Adds support for Voice Dictation to enable users to enter text in text fields using their voice. Voice Dictation can be invoked by selecting the text field and pressing the Siri button on the Siri Remote.; Adds Support for searching the App Store on the Apple TV using Siri.; Adds support for new Siri languages which include Spanish (United States), French (Canada), and English (United Kingdom and Australia).; Remote operability improvements; In order to rewind/fast forward the video in tvOS 9.2, it is now necessary to click the touchpad before swiping left or right.; Updates the remote firmware which includes improved motion sensor performance and support for additional sound bar and receiver hardware.; Enhancements to speed and performance. |
| 9.2.1 | 13Y772 | May 16, 2016 | General performance and stability improvements. |
| 9.2.2 | 13Y825 | July 18, 2016 | General performance and stability improvements.; Bug fixes. |

=== tvOS 10 ===
tvOS 10 version history
| tvOS version | Build | Release date | Features |
|---|---|---|---|
| 10.0 | 14T330 | September 13, 2016 | User Interface; Adds the option for users to select between a light mode or a new dark mode.; Adds support for app notification badge icons on the tvOS home screen.; Siri; Support for searching YouTube for content using Siri.; Support for searching for content by topic.; Photos; Adds support for the new Photos app available in iOS 10 which adds a new feature called Memories; Music; Update the UI of Apple Music to match the UI of Apple Music on iOS 10 and macOS Sierra.; Control; When users start typing on the Apple TV using the Siri Remote, their iPhone on iOS 10 or later gives them a lockscreen notification that allows for text entry, even without the remote app installed on the iOS device.; No longer requires developers to provide support for the Siri Remote in games. A game can now make a third-party MFI controller required for gameplay.; HomeKit; Allows the control of HomeKit accessories from the Apple TV.; Developer Tools; Adds many new APIs that developers can take advantage of on tvOS such as ReplayKit, SpriteKit, SceneKit, and more. |
| 10.0.1 | 14U71; 14U100 | October 24, 2016; November 14, 2016 (14U100) | General performance and stability improvements.; Bug fixes. |
| 10.1 | 14U593 | December 12, 2016 | General performance and stability improvements.; New "TV" app; Added "Single Sign-On" |
| 10.1.1 | 14U712a | January 23, 2017 | General performance and stability improvements. |
| 10.2 | 14W265 | March 27, 2017 | Adds support for Apple File System (APFS); General performance and stability improvements |
| 10.2.1 | 14W585a | May 15, 2017 | Security and Bug Fixes |
| 10.2.2 | 14W756 | July 19, 2017 | Security and Bug Fixes |

=== tvOS 11 ===
tvOS 11 version history
| tvOS version | Build | Release date | Features |
|---|---|---|---|
| 11.0 | 15J381 | September 19, 2017 | Initial release on Apple TV 4K (1st generation).; Adds support for 2160p output in HDR10 and Dolby Vision with Apple TV 4K.; Control; Adds option to reprogram the TV button on Siri remote to open the TV app or to return to the home screen.; Adds support for controlling via Control Center from devices running iOS 11.; Experience; Apple AirPods automatically connect when paired with a device signed in with the same iCloud account.; Option for automatic switching between light and dark mode based on time of day.; Adds Home Screen Sync option that synchronizes apps and home screens across Apple TVs signed in with the same iCloud account.; Double tapping Siri remote will zoom in on pillarboxed or letterboxed video to fill frame.; Tapping timeline a second time will switch to a time-of-day display.; Developer tools; Increases maximum On-Demand Resource bundle size to 4 GB from 200 MB.; Adds support for HEVC and HEIF, hardware decoding on Apple TV 4K and software decoding on Apple TV (4th generation). |
| 11.1 | 15J582 | October 31, 2017 | Includes bug fixes and security improvements |
| 11.2 | 15K106 | December 4, 2017 | The update includes support for switching the Apple TV 4K display output to SDR for apps that are GPU-bound when running in HDR and it re-introduces the Unwatched category in Home Sharing for Movies, TV Shows, and Home Videos. |
| 11.2.1 | 15K152 | December 13, 2017 | Includes bug fixes and security improvements |
| 11.2.5 | 15K552 | January 23, 2018 | Includes bug fixes and security improvements |
| 11.2.6 | 15K600 | February 19, 2018 | Includes bug fixes and security improvements |
| 11.3 | 15L211 | March 29, 2018 | tvOS 11.3 beta provides Dolby Vision support for certain Sony 2017 4K HDR televisions with the X1 Extreme processor. |
| 11.4 | 15L577 | May 29, 2018 | AirPlay 2: Listen to your favorite songs across every Apple TV, HomePod, and AirPlay 2-compatible speaker you have in your home. Or play something different in every room at the same time. |
| 11.4.1 | 15M73 | July 9, 2018 | Bug fixes and improvements |

=== tvOS 12 ===
tvOS 12 version history
| tvOS version | Build | Release date | Features |
|---|---|---|---|
| 12.0 | 16J364 | September 17, 2018 | Audio; Adds support for Dolby Atmos E-AC3 passthrough on Apple TV 4K, up to 7.1.4 channels; Experience; Adds support for Zero Sign-On automatic television app authentication with supported cable providers.; Adds password AutoFill from iPhones and iPads running iOS 12 or newer.; Adds new aerial screensavers.; Developer tools; Adds support for home control systems that include Control4, Crestron, and Savant.; Adds support for third-party remotes including Siri support. |
| 12.0.1 | 16J380 | September 24, 2018 | Bug fixes and improvements |
| 12.1 | 16J602 | October 30, 2018 | Bug fixes and improvements |
| 12.1.1 | 16K45 | December 5, 2018 | Bug fixes and improvements |
| 12.1.2 | 16K534 | January 22, 2019 | Bug fixes and improvements |
| 12.2 | 16L226 | March 25, 2019 | Siri and Apple TV Remote improvements |
| 12.2.1 | 16L250 | April 10, 2019 | Bug fixes and improvements |
| 12.3 | 16M153 | May 13, 2019 | Adds redesigned TV app; GUI changes in video player |
| 12.4 | 16M568 | July 22, 2019 | Bug fixes and improvements |
| 12.4.1 | 16M600 | August 26, 2019 | Security fixes |

=== tvOS 13 ===
tvOS 13 version history
| tvOS version | Build | Release date | Features |
|---|---|---|---|
| 13.0 | 17J586 | September 24, 2019 | Experience; Adds redesigned home screen with full-screen video previews.; Changes shape of app icons with more rounded corners.; Adds Control Center.; Adds support for multiple Apple IDs for built-in apps.; Adds scrolling music lyrics in the Music app.; Picture-in-picture multitasking in TV app.; Adds Apple Arcade app.; Adds new underwater screensavers.; Only menu and TV button wake from sleep.; Control; Adds support for the Xbox One and DualShock 4 wireless controllers.; Security Content |
| 13.2 | 17K82 | October 28, 2019 | Adds support for AirPods Pro.; Other stability improvements and bug fixes.; Security Content |
| 13.3 | 17K449 | December 10, 2019 | Stability improvements and bug fixes.; Security Content |
| 13.3.1 | 17K795 | January 28, 2020 | Security Content |
| 13.4 | 17L256 | March 24, 2020 | Security Content |
| 13.4.5 | 17L562 | May 20, 2020 | Stability improvements and bug fixes.; Security Content |
| 13.4.6 | 17L570 | June 1, 2020 | Stability improvements and bug fixes.; Security Content |
| 13.4.8 | 17M61 | July 15, 2020 | Stability improvements and bug fixes.; Security Content |

=== tvOS 14 ===
tvOS 14 version history
| tvOS version | Build | Release date | Features |
|---|---|---|---|
| 14.0 | 18J386 | September 16, 2020 | Experience: Changes shape of app icons with more rounded corners and reduced size.; Adds picture-in-picture to third-party apps.; Adds Audio Sharing for simultaneously connecting two sets of AirPods on Apple TV 4K.; Supports full-resolution AirPlay for 4K videos and photos on Apple TV 4K.; Redesigned Control Center.; Support for Microsoft Elite 2 and Adaptive Xbox One controllers.; HomeKit: Adds camera feeds and picture-in-picture monitoring for HomeKit-enabled security cameras.; Adds direct control of HomeKit accessories in Control Center.; Developer: Support for 4K YouTube videos on Apple TV 4K, supporting "the latest YouTube videos", reportedly through VP9 support. |
| 14.0.1 | 18J400 | September 24, 2020 | This update includes general performance and stability improvements. |
| 14.0.2 | 18J411 | October 5, 2020 | This update includes general performance and stability improvements. |
| 14.2 | 18K57 | November 5, 2020 | Adds support for using HomePod as Apple TV speaker.; Adds support for subscribing to Apple One subscription plan. |
| 14.3 | 18K561 | December 14, 2020 | New Apple TV+ tab in the Apple TV app.; Adds support for Apple Fitness. |
| 14.4 | 18K802 | January 26, 2021 | Stability improvements and bug fixes. |
| 14.5 | 18L204 | April 26, 2021 | Initial release on Apple TV 4K (2nd generation).; Adds support for Siri Remote (second generation).; New colour balance calibration setting in Settings app.; Adds Siri support in Austria (German) and Ireland/New Zealand (English).; Adds support for keyboard typing into Siri.; Adds support for offloading unused apps automatically.; Adds support for PlayStation DualSense and Xbox Wireless game controllers. |
| 14.6 | 18L569 | May 24, 2021 | Stability improvements and bug fixes.; Adds support for lossless playback and Dolby Atmos music in Apple Music on all Apple TV 4K models. |
| 14.7 | 18M60 | July 19, 2021 | Stability improvements and bug fixes. |

=== tvOS 15 ===
tvOS 15 version history
| tvOS version | Build | Release date | Features |
|---|---|---|---|
| 15.0 | 19J346 | September 20, 2021 | Adds support for controlling Apple TV with a HomePod or HomePod Mini.; Adds "Shared with You" row in TV app for movies and TV shows shared in Messages.; Redesigned video player interface.; Audio: Adds ability to use HomePod Mini as a speaker, supporting up to a stereo pair.; Adds support for spatial audio on Apple TV 4K with AirPods Pro and AirPods Max.; Automatic onscreen notification to connect AirPods family headphones.; HomeKit: Adds notifications from security devices.; Add support for viewing multiple HomeKit cameras simultaneously.; Developer: Enables authenticating purchases and signing into apps using Touch ID or Face ID on a paired iPhone or iPad. |
| 15.1 | 19J572 | October 25, 2021 | Stability improvements and bug fixes.; Adds support for SharePlay. |
| 15.1.1 | 19J581 | November 1, 2021 | Adds Apple TV support in South Korea. |
| 15.2 | 19K53 | December 13, 2021 | New Memories feature in Photos app.; New Store tab in Apple TV app.; Adds support for subscribing to Apple Music Voice subscription plan.; Adds Siri support for additional languages.; New screensavers. |
| 15.3 | 19K547 | January 26, 2022 | Stability improvements and bug fixes.; Resolves several security vulnerabilities. |
| 15.4 | 19L440 | March 14, 2022 | Support for captive portal networks via a connected iPhone or iPad.; Adds "Up Next" queue and volume controller to video player; Adds purchase authentication with Apple Watch; Adds support for displaying HomeKit cameras in picture-in-picture |
| 15.4.1 | 19L452 | March 31, 2022 | Stability improvements and bug fixes when setting up/restoring Apple TV. |
| 15.5 | 19L570 | May 16, 2022 | Stability improvements and bug fixes. |
| 15.5.1 | 19L580 | May 25, 2022 | Fix for a bug where music playback could stop after a while. |
| 15.6 | 19M65 | July 20, 2022 | Stability improvements and bug fixes. |

=== tvOS 16 ===
tvOS 16 version history
| tvOS version | Build | Release date | Features |
|---|---|---|---|
| 16.0 | 20J8378 | Preinstalled (Note: tvOS 16.0 (20J8378) was shipped preinstalled on some launch Apple TV 4K (3rd generation) devices and is not released for download.) | Adds support for Nintendo Switch's Joy-Cons and Pro Controllers, and additional Bluetooth and USB game controllers.; Adds support for HDR10+ in Apple TV app on Apple TV 4K (3rd generation); Adds video previews in Apple TV app; Adds on-screen Intensity Metrics with Fitness+ |
| 16.0 | 20J373 | September 12, 2022 | Adds support for Nintendo Switch's Joy-Cons and Pro Controllers, and additional Bluetooth and USB game controllers.; Adds support for HDR10+ in Apple TV app on Apple TV 4K (3rd generation); Adds video previews in Apple TV app; Adds on-screen Intensity Metrics with Fitness+ |
| 16.1 | 20K71 | October 24, 2022 | Initial release on Apple TV 4K (3rd generation).; Adds support for Matter; Adds support for shared Photo libraries; Redesigned Siri interface and voice recognition for up to six users.; Support for "Hey Siri" with AirPods family headphones |
| 16.1.1 | 20K80 | November 16, 2022 | For Apple TV 4K (3rd generation) 128 GB only.; Fix for a bug where Apple TV could become unable to install apps. |
| 16.2 | 20K362 | December 13, 2022 | Adds the ability to set the Siri language to be different from the language displayed on the Apple TV.; Adds language support to Siri for Danish in Denmark, French and German in Luxembourg, and English in Singapore.; Adds beat-by-beat, real-time lyrics in Apple Music.; Adds Apple Music Sing karaoke feature on Apple TV 4K (3rd generation); Adds the ability to control the vocal volume of songs in Apple Music on the Apple TV 4K (3rd generation). |
| 16.3 | 20K650 | January 24, 2023 | Stability improvements and bug fixes. |
| 16.3.1 | 20K661 | February 6, 2023 | Stability improvements and bug fixes. |
| 16.3.2 | 20K672 | February 13, 2023 | Stability improvements and bug fixes. |
| 16.3.3 | 20K680 | March 6, 2023 | This update fixes an issue where the Siri Remote can become unresponsive on Apple TV 4K (3rd generation only). |
| 16.4 | 20L497 | March 27, 2023 | Adds support for the redesigned Apple Home architecture introduced with iOS 16.4.; New accessibility option called "Dim Flashing Lights" added to automatically dim the video when light flashes or strobe effects are detected onscreen.; Stability improvements and bug fixes. |
| 16.4.1 | 20L498 | April 12, 2023 | Stability improvements and bug fixes.; Security fix. |
| 16.5 | 20L563 | May 18, 2023 | Adds multiview support in TV app for MLS Season Pass and Friday Night Baseball on Apple TV 4K; Adds Thread 1.3 support |
| 16.6 | 20M73 | July 24, 2023 | Adds Siri support for Hebrew in Israel to help you find TV programmes, music and more using just your voice; performance and stability improvements. |

=== tvOS 17 ===
tvOS 17 version history
| tvOS version | Build | Release date | Features |
|---|---|---|---|
| 17.0 | 21J354 | September 18, 2023 | Adds support for FaceTime on Apple TV 4K (2nd generation and newer) with a paired iPhone or iPad running iOS 17/iPadOS 17, with support for Center Stage and Split View with iPhones and iPads with an Apple A13 chip or newer; Adds ability to locate a Siri Remote (2nd generation or later) with a paired iPhone or iPad; Redesigned Control Center; Adds option to reduce icon size to fit six icons per row; Adds custom plan and stacks to Apple Fitness+; Audio/video: Adds support for Dolby Vision 8.1 on Apple TV 4K; Enhance Dialogue to boost dialogue volume on Apple TV 4K paired with HomePod (2nd generation); Developer: Adds support for third-party video conferencing applications on Apple TV 4K (2nd generation and newer); Adds support for VPNs |
| 17.1 | 21K69 | October 25, 2023 | Adds support for Enhance Dialogue with the HomePod (1st generation) and HomePod Mini.; Adds a new favoriting option to the Music app, along with some other minor Music changes. |
| 17.2 | 21K365 | December 11, 2023 | Redesigned TV app including a new sidebar menu and the ability to switch between profiles within the app; FaceTime with Apple TV 4K (second generation or newer): Adds the ability to answer FaceTime calls directly on Apple TV; Support for FaceTime Audio calls; Adds the ability to move a FaceTime call from an iPhone or iPad to Apple TV; Dolby Atmos and Dolby Digital surround sound are now supported when using SharePlay; Adds audio focus to Apple Fitness+; Adds the ability to start voice search from anywhere in supported apps with the Siri button on the Siri Remote; Deprecates the iTunes Movies and iTunes TV Shows apps, with both apps now redirecting users to the TV app to access their purchased Movies and TV shows. |
| 17.3 | 21K646 | January 22, 2024 | This update includes performance and stability improvements. |
| 17.4 | 21L227 | March 7, 2024 | This update includes performance and stability improvements. |
| 17.5 | 21L569 | May 13, 2024 | |
| 17.5.1 | 21L580 | May 21, 2024 | Fix Photos corruption bug that caused deleted images to reappear |
| 17.6 | 21M71 | July 29, 2024 | |
| 17.6.1 | 21M80 | August 19, 2024 | |

=== tvOS 18 ===
tvOS 18 version history
| tvOS version | Build | Release date | Features |
|---|---|---|---|
| 18.0 | 22J357 | September 16, 2024 | Adds InSight to Apple TV app to display information about actors, characters, and music from Apple TV+ content.; Adds support for Enhance Dialogue with third party speakers with Apple TV 4K (2nd generation or later); Live captions in FaceTime with Apple TV 4K (2nd generation or later); Redesigned Fitness app; New Portraits screensaver mode; Using mute button on Siri Remote (2nd generation or later) automatically turns on subtitles; The ability to set photo (screen saver) durations disappears: Settings / Screen Saver / Memories & Slideshows / Style / Classic / Time Per Slide ...is gone. |
| 18.1 | 22J580 | October 28, 2024 | |
| 18.2 | 22K155 | December 11, 2024 | Adds option to display in a 21:9 aspect ratio for projectors with Apple TV 4K (third generation) |
| 18.2.1 | 22K160 | January 16, 2025 | Fixes a data syncing issue. |
| 18.3 | 22K557 | January 27, 2025 | Security fix. |
| 18.3.1 | 22K561 | March 11, 2025 | Third-generation Apple TV 4K only. Fixes a streaming playback issue. |
| 18.4 | 22L254 | March 31, 2025 | The ability to set photo (screen saver) durations has returned. Settings / Screen Saver / Memories & Slideshows / Style / Classic / Time Per Slide. This setting disappeared with 18.0. |
| 18.4.1 | 22L261 | April 16, 2025 | Security fix. |
| 18.5 | 22L572 | May 12, 2025 | Adds support for synchronizing Dolby Atmos playback over Bluetooth or AirPlay. |
| 18.6 | 22M84 | July 29, 2025 | Security fix. |

=== tvOS 26 ===
Apple advanced the version number to 26, succeeding tvOS 18, as part of a shift to a year-based versioning convention across its operating systems.

tvOS 26 version history
| tvOS version | Build | Release date | Features |
|---|---|---|---|
| 26.0 | 23J353 | September 15, 2025 | Adds new Liquid Glass user interface with Apple TV 4K (2nd generation or later); Apple Music Sing on Apple TV 4K (3rd generation): Adds ability to use an iPhone running iOS 26 as a microphone.; Adds ability for multiple users to queue songs and react with emojis using an iPhone running iOS 26 on the same Wi-Fi network.; Adds lyrics translation for select songs.; FaceTime with Apple TV 4K (second generation or newer): Adds incoming call notifications and contact posters; Live captions in French, German, Japanese, Korean, Mandarin, and Spanish; Adds option to automatically select user profile when Apple TV wakes; Adds Automatic Sign-In API with ability to link login information saved with an Apple account and automatically sign in with supported apps.; Adds ability to set any AirPlay speaker as the permanent speaker with Apple TV 4K models; Adds new aerial screensavers of India |
| 26.0.1 | 23J362 | September 29, 2025 | Bug fixes |
| 26.1 | 23J582 | November 3, 2025 | Bug fixes |
| 26.2 | 23K54 | December 12, 2025 | Adds the ability to add a new profile without an Apple account. |
| 26.3 | 23K620 | February 11, 2026 | Bug fixes |
| 26.4 | 23L243 | March 24, 2026 | Adds Genius Browse to the Apple TV app; Adds Continuous Audio Connection to Settings to Apple TV 4K models to fix an audio playback issue; Adds Subtitle Styling; Removes the iTunes TV Shows and iTunes Movies apps |
| 26.5 | 23L471 | May 11, 2026 | |
| 26.6 | 23L773 | July 27, 2026 | |
Post-tvOS 27 update for Apple TV HD and Apple TV 4K (1st generation)
| 26.6.1 | 23L781 | October 26, 2026 | Final release on Apple TV HD and Apple TV 4K (1st generation): Adds Siri Remote (4th Generation) support to Apple TV HD and Apple TV 4K (1st generation) |

=== tvOS 27 ===
tvOS 27 was announced at Apple's WWDC 2026 on June 8, 2026, and was released on September 14, 2026.

tvOS 27 version history
| tvOS version | Build | Release date | Features |
|---|---|---|---|
| 27.0 | 24J361 | September 14, 2026 | Initial release on Apple TV 4K (4th generation). Drops support for Apple TV HD and Apple TV 4K (1st generation).: Redesigned Podcasts app; Apple TV updates can now be installed via the Home app; AudioMix and 24-bit/192 kHz Hi-Res Lossless have been added to the Apple Music app with Apple TV 4K (3rd generation); System-wide text can now be customized; Faster AirPlay connections; Users can be blocked from using specific apps in Settings |
| 27.2 | 24K122 | October 26, 2026 | |
| 27.2.1 | 24K157 | November 13, 2026 | |
| 27.3 beta 2 | 24K5298d | November 16, 2026 | |

== Hardware support ==
Supported tvOS versions on Apple TV
| Model | Apple TV Software | | | | | | | tvOS | | | | | | | | | | | |
| Model | 1 | 2 | 3 | 4 | 5 | 6 | 7 | 9 | 10 | 11 | 12 | 13 | 14 | 15 | 16 | 17 | 18 | 26 | 27 |
|---|---|---|---|---|---|---|---|---|---|---|---|---|---|---|---|---|---|---|---|
| Apple TV (1st) | Supported | Supported | Supported | Unsupported | Unsupported | Unsupported | Unsupported | Unsupported | Unsupported | Unsupported | Unsupported | Unsupported | Unsupported | Unsupported | Unsupported | Unsupported | Unsupported | Unsupported | Unsupported |
| Apple TV (2nd) | —N/a | —N/a | —N/a | Supported | Supported | Supported | Unsupported | Unsupported | Unsupported | Unsupported | Unsupported | Unsupported | Unsupported | Unsupported | Unsupported | Unsupported | Unsupported | Unsupported | Unsupported |
| Apple TV (3rd) | —N/a | —N/a | —N/a | —N/a | Supported | Supported | Supported | Unsupported | Unsupported | Unsupported | Unsupported | Unsupported | Unsupported | Unsupported | Unsupported | Unsupported | Unsupported | Unsupported | Unsupported |
| Apple TV HD | —N/a | —N/a | —N/a | —N/a | —N/a | —N/a | —N/a | Supported | Supported | Supported | Supported | Supported | Supported | Supported | Supported | Supported | Supported | Supported | Unsupported |
| Apple TV 4K (1st) | —N/a | —N/a | —N/a | —N/a | —N/a | —N/a | —N/a | —N/a | —N/a | Supported | Supported | Supported | Supported | Supported | Supported | Supported | Supported | Supported | Unsupported |
| Apple TV 4K (2nd) | —N/a | —N/a | —N/a | —N/a | —N/a | —N/a | —N/a | —N/a | —N/a | —N/a | —N/a | —N/a | 14.5 | Supported | Supported | Supported | Supported | Supported | Supported |
| Apple TV 4K (3rd) | —N/a | —N/a | —N/a | —N/a | —N/a | —N/a | —N/a | —N/a | —N/a | —N/a | —N/a | —N/a | —N/a | —N/a | 16.1 | Supported | Supported | Supported | Supported |
| Apple TV 4K (4th) | —N/a | —N/a | —N/a | —N/a | —N/a | —N/a | —N/a | —N/a | —N/a | —N/a | —N/a | —N/a | —N/a | —N/a | —N/a | —N/a | —N/a | —N/a | Supported |
