= MFi Program =

Licensing program for peripherals for iPod, iPad and iPhone

The modern Made for iPod logo is typical of the MFi program badging.

Apple's MFi Program, short for "Made for iPhone/iPod/iPad", is a licensing program for developers of hardware and software peripherals that work with Apple's iPod, iPad, iPhone and Apple Watch lines. The name originally stood for Made for iPod when the program started in 2005.

The MFi Program covers various device connectors and technologies including the TRSS headphone jack, the 30-pin dock connector, the Lightning connector, the Apple Watch magnetic charger, the MagSafe charger and MagSafe accessories, products that interface with iPhone and Apple Watch digital keys, Find My, CarPlay, AirPlay, HomeKit, iBeacons, game controllers, hearing aids and other devices. Companies that join the MFi Program and pass certification tests are able to display certain MFi-related logos on their product packaging, like the "Made for iPod" badge.

== Overview ==
=== Made for iPod ===
The Made for iPod program was announced at the Macworld Expo on 11 January 2005. Some products released just before the announcement carried a "Ready for iPod" label instead. It was reported at that time that Apple would be taking a 10% cut for all products with the logo, which media outlets described as a "tax" on accessory makers. iPods use an extended TRSS headphone jack that allows additional control inputs like muting and volume adjustments, and licenses were available for products that plug into the iPod's jack or 30-pin dock connector.

When using the 30-pin dock connector, devices are able to control the iPod using a simple serial protocol known as the Apple Accessory Protocol (AAP). This uses a (normally) 19,200 bit/s 8N1 communications signal to send short packets containing commands like "take voice note" or "volume up". With the introduction of the 3rd generation iPod, AAP was available to the headphone connection as well. These signals are used by many Made for iPod devices to allow remote control, including car integration systems.

=== Made for iPhone and Made for iPad ===
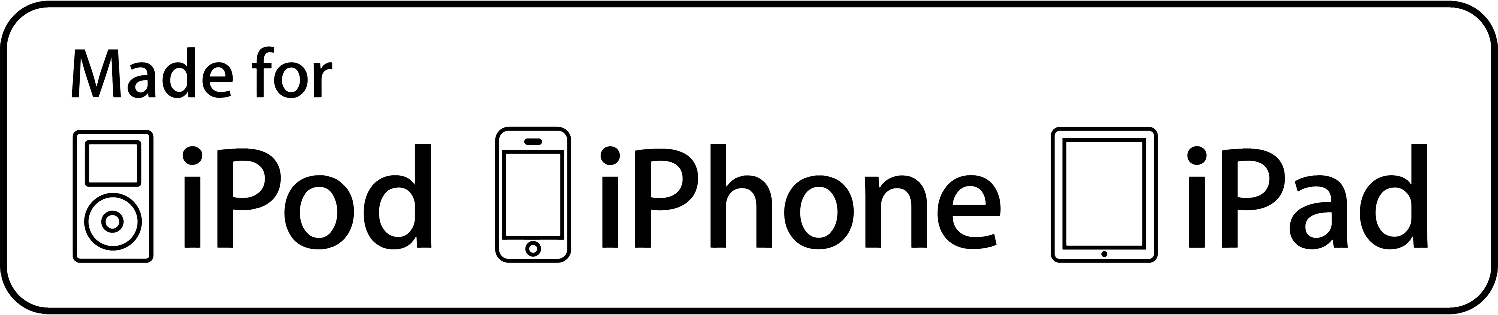
Logo for iPod, iPhone and iPad

With the introduction of the iPhone in 2007, the program added "Made for iPhone" certification. "Made for iPad" certification was introduced in 2010 following the introduction of the iPad. The program was formally renamed as the MFi Program in 2010, although this term had been used unofficially for some time.

The Lightning connector, introduced in 2012, added additional protocols that could only be certified through the MFi Program. In addition to the technical requirements, Apple also updated the licensing agreement to require all third parties to agree to Apple's supplier responsibility code. The iPhone and iPad lines had transitioned from Lightning to USB-C by 2024, and Apple does not include USB-C charging cables or peripherals in the program.

The release of the developer's version of iOS 7 at WWDC 2013 included a new MFi approval process for game controllers, including wrap-around designs that clip onto an iOS device, or completely separate wireless models.

=== AirPlay ===
The MFi Program covers the AirTunes system for wirelessly streaming music. AirTunes was originally introduced in 2004 on the Mac and PC platforms inside iTunes, and later became known as AirPlay when video-out capabilities were added to support devices like the Apple TV. AirPlay came to the devices when they gained Wi-Fi capabilities with the introduction of the iPhone and iPod Touch. With no hardware component, AirPlay has been widely implemented in both official and non-MFi software systems.

=== Other devices ===
The MFi Program expanded to include certification for accessories that include the Apple Watch magnetic charger and the MagSafe charger and compatible cases for iPhones. The program also includes devices that interface with iPhones and Apple Watches using NFC and UWB digital keys, and motorized stands and gimbals for iPhones using DockKit.

Smart home devices that work with Apple Home using the HomeKit protocol must also be certified by the MFi Program and use an encryption co-processor. Products that use the open Matter standard only require MFi certification if they use Apple-specific features such as HomeKit Secure Video.

== Product badging ==
The following badges are included on products to indicate they have been certified by the MFi Program:

- Made for iPhone/iPod/iPad: Products certified to work with iPhones, iPads and iPods, including products that use the 30-pin dock connector and the Lightning connector. It also covers the Smart Connector on iPads, readers of NFC/UWB digital keys and DockKit motorized stands and gimbals with iPhones. MFi game controllers also work with the Apple TV (HD or later) and Apple Vision Pro, and are sometimes also badged "Made for Apple TV".
- Made for Apple Watch: Products that include an Apple Watch magnetic charging module produced by Apple or interface with NFC/UWB digital keys. Products that integrate with Apple Watches using GymKit may be badged "Connects to Apple Watch".
- Made for MagSafe: Products that include a MagSafe charging module produced by Apple and accessories that use licensed magnet modules and support communication through NFC.
- Works with Apple AirPlay: Products certified to work with AirPlay. Products that support video include a logo shaped like a TV screen.
- Works with Apple Find My: Products that are certified to work with the Find My network.
- Works with Apple HomeKit: Products that are certified to work with Apple Home using the HomeKit protocol. Additionally, products that use the Matter protocol may be badged "Works with Apple Home".
- Works with Apple CarPlay: Products certified to work with CarPlay.
