= Jay Blahnik =

American fitness instructor and trainer

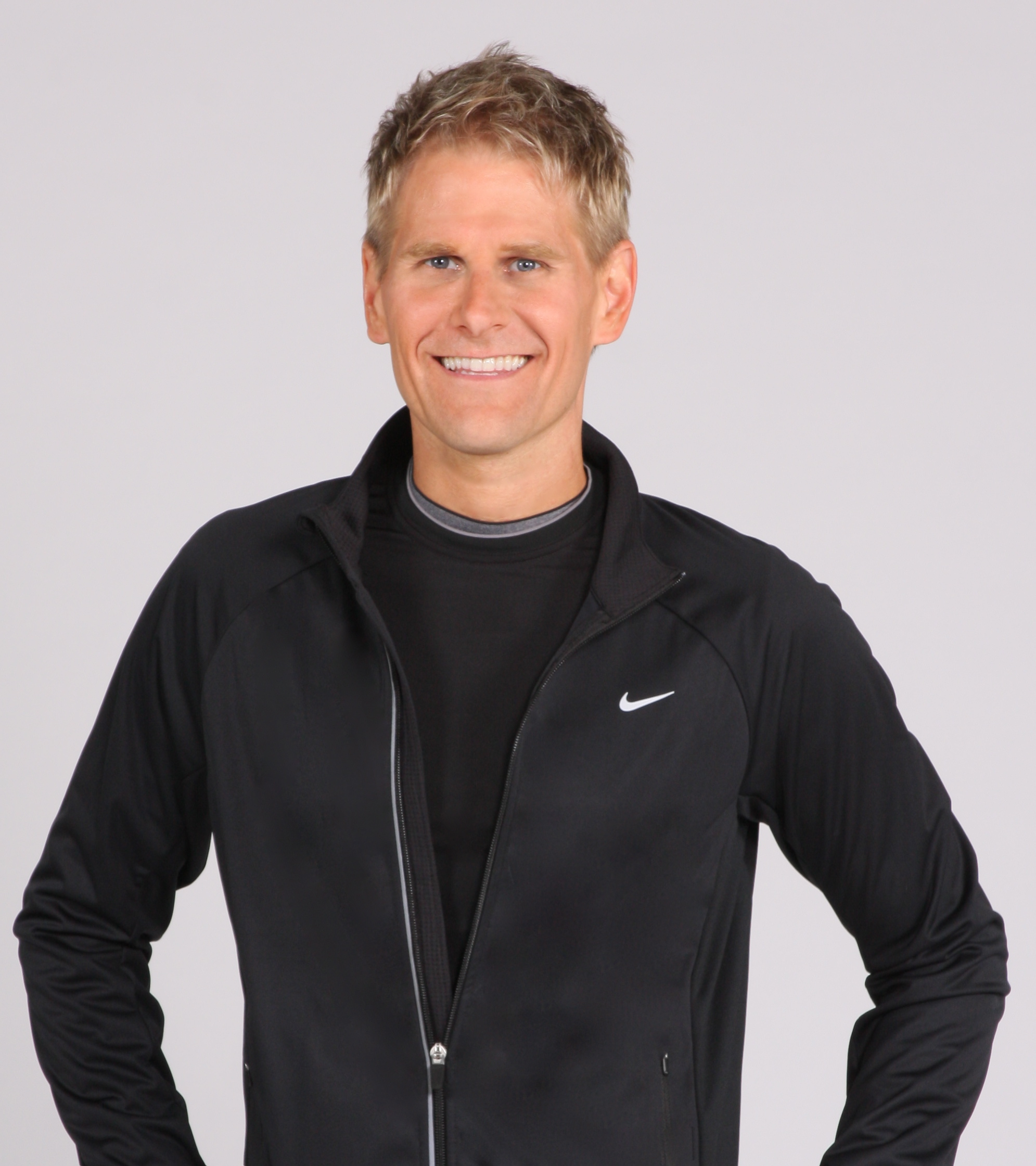
- Occupations: Fitness instructor, trainer, consultant, author, program developer and Vice President of Fitness Technologies for Apple Inc.

Jay Blahnik is an American fitness instructor, trainer, consultant, author, program developer, and the Vice President of Fitness Technologies for Apple Inc. Widely known as an authority on exercise and fitness issues as well as digital health and consumer behavior change, Blahnik has been a fitness expert for MSNBC.com and the Los Angeles Times and authored the book Full-Body Flexibility in 2004.

== Fitness expert ==
Blahnik has produced and starred in a large number of fitness and workout videos and has consulted and represented a variety of prominent fitness equipment companies including Nike, Nautilus, Bowflex, Schwinn and Stairmaster.

Blahnik was a resident fitness consultant and contributor for MSNBC.com and NBCnews.com networks, and, in addition to authoring other books and articles, he has been a regular contributor on fitness and related topics for the Los Angeles Times.

Blahnik has also consulted as a topical expert on a variety of fitness issues ranging from technical instructions like treadmill techniques to strategic questions like what kinds of workout are appropriate at specific points in the fitness journey, and he has been consulted as an expert on careers in fitness.

In 1996, Blahnik was selected as the International Instructor of the Year for the IDEA Health and Fitness Association, a global membership association for fitness and wellness professionals.

== Abuse allegations ==
According to a 2025 New York Times report, Blahnik was accused by nine current and former employees of Apple of creating a hostile work environment. One employee alleged sexual harassment from Blahnik. An internal company review found no evidence of wrongdoing by Blahnik. Apple denied misconduct by Blahnik, while Blahnik did not respond to requests for comment.

== Full-Body Flexibility ==
Published in 2004, Blahnik's book Full-Body Flexibility, provides techniques and strategies for creating and maintaining flexibility as part of a healthy workout routine and was a "critically acclaimed best seller."
