= Google Fit =

Health-tracking platform by Google

- Screenshot Google Fit running on Android 9.0 "Pie"
- Developer: Google
- Release: October 28, 2014; 11 years ago

Stable release(s) [±]
- Android: 2026.7.2.1 / July 10, 2026; 56 days ago
- iOS: 1.104 / June 19, 2026; 2 months ago
- Wear OS: 2026.6.4 / June 20, 2026; 2 months ago
- Operating system: Android 7+; iOS 16+; Wear OS
- Available in: 34 languages
- List of languages Bulgarian, Catalan, Croatian, Czech, Danish, Dutch, English, Finnish, French, German, Greek, Hindi, Hungarian, Indonesian, Italian, Japanese, Korean, Latvian, Lithuanian, Malay, Norwegian, Polish, Portuguese, Romanian, Russian, Simplified Chinese, Slovak, Spanish, Swedish, Thai, Traditional Chinese, Turkish, Ukrainian and Vietnamese
- Type: Health informatics, physical fitness
- License: Proprietary
- Website: www.google.com/fit/

Google Fit is a health-tracking platform developed by Google for the Android operating system, Wear OS, and iOS. It is a single set of APIs that blends data from multiple apps and devices. Google Fit uses sensors in a user's activity tracker or mobile device to record physical fitness activities (such as walking, cycling, etc.), which are measured against the user's fitness goals to provide a comprehensive view of their fitness. It is set to be replaced by the Google Health app in 2026, five years after Google acquired the health company Fitbit.

== History ==
Google Fit was announced at the Google I/O conference on June 25, 2014. A software development kit for Google Fit was released on August 7, 2014. Fit launched to the public on October 28, 2014.

In August 2018, Google announced a revamp to its Android Fit platform which adds activity goals based on activity recommendations from the American Heart Association and the World Health Organization. The updates are meant to help Fit better provide metrics for activities other than walking and encourage users to engage in activities that will raise the heart rate without necessarily requiring a trip to the gym.

In April 2019, Google announced Google Fit for iOS offering similar experience to its Android counterpart. Google Fit for iOS used Apple Health, Nike Run Club, Headspace or connected device such as Apple Watch or Wear OS smartwatch connected to user device. In August 2019, Google announced dark theme, sleep insights and workout map feature availability.

In April 2020, Google redesigned Google Fit. In November 2020, Google Fit added iOS 14 widget.

In February 2021, Google announced a Pixel 5 exclusive feature for Google Fit, heart rate and respiratory measurement using Pixel 5's camera. In June 2021, Google announced support for paced walking.

In 2022, Google began to deprecate Google Fit Rest API & SDK in favor of acquiring Health Connect APIs. Google stated that the Google Fit APIs will be shut down in 2026. Google announced in May 2026 that it will be replaced by the Google Health app by the end of 2026.

== Functionality ==
Google Fit provided a single set of API for apps and device manufacturers to store and access activity data from fitness apps and sensors on Android and other devices (like wearables, heart rate monitors or connected scales). Users can choose who their fitness data is shared with as well as delete this information at any time.

== See also ==
- Health (Apple)
- Samsung Health
- Strava
