= Mood tracking =

Psychological technique

Mood tracking is the regular recording of one's mood, usually at set time intervals, to help identify patterns in mood variation. It has been suggested as both a self-help method and a potential tool for people with mood disorders such as anxiety, clinical depression, and bipolar disorder.

== Mood and its measurement ==
Mood exists on a continuum between short-lived affective reactions to external stimuli, which fluctuate over seconds and minutes, and temperament, which remains relatively stable over years and decades. Mood itself varies over hours and days, following natural circadian patterns. Tracking these fluctuations systematically is relevant both to general emotional wellbeing, such as identifying associations with contextual factors, and to the management of mood disorders.

Over time, two main approaches to mood measurement have emerged. Discrete models, such as the Profile of Mood States (POMS), measure specific states like anger or tension in isolation, but they cannot capture their interrelation or a person's overall feeling. This limitation has driven a shift towards dimensional models, such as the Positive and Negative Affect Schedule (PANAS), which locate any mood state along a broader grid of positive and negative activation.

To make repeated measurements less burdensome, researchers have largely adopted the shortened 10-item version of PANAS, known as I-PANAS-SF. However, even this has been found too demanding for consistent daily or hourly use. By shortening the scales further, researchers risk compromising validity, while keeping them longer preserves validity but reduces compliance. This creates an ongoing tension between assessment quality and app quality.

== Methods and technologies ==
A variety of tools and technologies are available to help individuals track their moods. Traditionally, mood assessment relied on clinical interviews and pen-and-paper surveys. However, these methods are limited by recall bias, low participant compliance, and insufficient frequency to capture rapid mood fluctuations. The increased capability and affordability of digital technology have supported the adoption of ecological momentary assessment (EMA), in which questionnaires are distributed via smartphones, requiring immediate responses at multiple points throughout the day. Although EMA reduces recall bias by capturing mood closer to the moment of experience, it remains subject to self-report limitations, and risks becoming burdensome or intrusive due to the frequency of questionnaires.

A review of 32 mobile mood tracking apps identified a range of mood recording methods, including emojis, predefined text, colours, numeric scales, and photos. Users generally preferred simple but customisable entry methods, favouring visual review formats such as line graphs and calendars over aggregated summaries such as pie charts. Although most apps provided strong support for data collection and visualisation, very few offered guidance on how to interpret or act on the recorded data.

Beyond self-report, smartphones can passively collect behavioural data, including GPS location, call logs, and phone activity. GPS location data, specifically movement patterns and consistency of daily routines, has been shown to correlate significantly with the severity of depressive symptoms. Voice and speech analysis has also been explored as a method of inferring mood states, with one study reporting 80% accuracy in identifying mood states in bipolar disorder patients from phone call data. Other wearable technologies can further collect physiological data, such as heart rate variability and skin conductance, as potential objective indicators of mood. However, many of these technologies remain largely experimental, facing challenges around cost and accuracy in capturing mood itself rather than just its physiological correlates.

== Clinical applications ==
The natural course of mood disorders, such as depression and bipolar disorder, commonly involves periodic episodes preceded by early warning signs. Mood tracking can help identify these signs and make connections with environmental triggers, informing relapse prevention strategies. For example, the MONARCA system used daily smartphone self-monitoring of mood, sleep, activity, and individualised early warning signs to help predict oncoming manic episodes in bipolar disorder patients. Clinicians have also reportedly recommended mood tracking apps to patients to support treatment conversations and trigger identification.

Despite this potential, there is limited evidence for the long-term clinical effectiveness of mood tracking programmes. A meta-analysis of 8 clinical trials involving 1,230 participants found no statistically significant effect of consistent mood monitoring on symptoms of mania or bipolar depression after 6 to 12 months of follow-up. In unipolar depression, there was a small effect of borderline significance at 12 months but not at 6 months. Nevertheless, mood tracking remains widely used, with 41.6% of people with bipolar disorder reporting use of a self-management app for mood or sleep. While researchers advise against using it as a substitute for professional mental health treatment, they suggest it can be a useful tool for individuals to complement their existing treatment and support overall well-being.

== Ethical concerns ==
The collection of highly personal data, ranging from self-reported mood to location, raises ethical concerns around privacy and commodification. Non-commercial models, such as apps funded through voluntary donations rather than data monetisation, have demonstrated that mood tracking programmes can function effectively without collecting or selling personal data. However, most commercially available apps lack such safeguards, as their business models rely on the collection and monetisation of user data.

Design choices in mood tracking apps also embed assumptions about emotional states. For example, the widespread use of colour hierarchies associating positive moods with green and negative moods with red implicitly devalues negative emotional experiences. There are further concerns that repeatedly prompting individuals with depression to rate their mood may increase focus on negative states, with some users reporting reluctance to record negative moods altogether. As these technologies become more widespread, researchers have emphasised the need for greater scrutiny of how emotional data is collected, used, and protected.
