= Nir Eyal =

American writer, educator, and entrepreneur

- Eyal in 2023
- Education: Stanford University (MBA); Emory University (BA)
- Occupation: Author
- Writing career
- Subjects: Psychology; technology; business
- Notable works: Hooked (2014); Indistractable (2019); Beyond Belief (2026)
- Website: nirandfar.com

Nir Eyal is an American author, lecturer, and investor. He is the author of Hooked: How to Build Habit-Forming Products (2014), Indistractable: How to Control Your Attention and Choose Your Life (2019), and Beyond Belief: The Science-Backed Way to Stop Limiting Yourself and Achieve Extraordinary Results (2026). His books address behavioral design, habit formation, attention, and motivation.

== Biography ==
=== Early life and education ===
Nir Eyal was born on February 19, 1980, in Hadera, Israel. When he was three, his family immigrated to the United States and settled in a suburb of Orlando, Florida. He earned a B.A. at Emory University in 2001 He worked for Boston Consulting Group and started a solar-panel company before pursuing an MBA at Stanford University, which he completed in 2008.

=== Academic and literary career ===
After graduating from Stanford in 2008, Eyal and fellow students founded a company that placed online ads on Facebook, with Eyal as CEO. This work sparked his interest in the psychology of users, and he went on to become a consultant in product design. From 2012 to 2017, he taught as a lecturer in marketing at the Stanford Graduate School of Business and as an instructor at the Hasso Plattner Institute of Design at Stanford. His work in behavioral design applies behavioral science to product development, particularly the design of products intended to encourage repeated use.

== Books and publications ==
=== Hooked: How to Build Habit-Forming Products ===
Eyal published Hooked: How to Build Habit-Forming Products in 2014. In his book, Eyal introduced the Hook Model, a framework for explaining user engagement through four stages: trigger, action, variable reward, and investment. The model describes how prompts initiate behavior, how variable rewards may reinforce it, and how users' investments of time, effort, or information can encourage continued engagement.

His book discusses the application of behavioral psychology to digital products and services. Eyal has also written about the development and application of the Hook Model. Hooked was nominated for the Goodreads Choice Award in the Readers' Favorite Business Books category in 2014. The book became a Wall Street Journal best-seller.

=== Indistractable: How to Control Your Attention and Choose Your Life ===
His book Indistractable published in September 2019 examines distraction and the factors affecting attention. His book presents strategies for identifying internal triggers, planning time, managing interruptions, and aligning behavior with personal priorities.

His book addresses individual habits and the role of technology. The book won the Big Idea category of the 2019 Outstanding Works of Literature (OWL) Awards and was included in Audible's 2019 personal-development book selections.

=== Beyond Belief: The Science-Backed Way to Stop Limiting Yourself and Achieve Extraordinary Results ===
Eyal's third book, Beyond Belief: The Science-Backed Way to Stop Limiting Yourself and Achieve Extraordinary Results, edited by his business partner and wife, Julie Li, was published by Portfolio on March 10, 2026. It examines how beliefs influence motivation and behavior through a framework organized around attention, anticipation, and agency.

In a June 2026 review in The Financial Express, Madan Sabnavis discussed the book's framework and its distinction between constructive beliefs and positive fantasies. Writing in Fast Company in May 2026, Natalie Nixon discussed the book's implications for organizational culture, leadership, and responses to artificial intelligence. Beyond Belief debuted at No. 9 on The New York Times Advice, How-To & Miscellaneous bestseller list dated March 29, 2026.

== Views ==
In a 2019 interview with Ezra Klein for Vox, Eyal discussed the distinction between technology overuse and addiction and emphasized individuals' ability to manage distraction. His discussion also addressed the responsibilities of technology companies and the extent to which product design contributes to users' behavior.

== Awards and honors ==
- In 2017, LinkedIn included Eyal in its Top Voices list for technology.
- Hooked: How to Build Habit-Forming Products was nominated for the Goodreads Choice Award in the Readers' Favorite Business Books category in 2014.
- Indistractable won the Big Idea category of the 2019 Outstanding Works of Literature (OWL) Awards.
- Indistractable was included in Audible's 2019 personal-development book selections.
- Beyond Belief debuted at No. 9 on The New York Times Advice, How-To & Miscellaneous bestseller list on March 29, 2026.

== Bibliography ==
- Eyal, Nir (2014). Hooked: How to Build Habit-Forming Products. Random House. ISBN 978-1591847786.
- Eyal, Nir (2019). Indistractable: How to Control Your Attention and Choose Your Life. BenBella Books. ISBN 978-1948836531.
- Eyal, Nir (2026). Beyond Belief: The Science-Backed Way to Stop Limiting Yourself and Achieve Extraordinary Result. Portfolio. ISBN 978-0593852033.
