= Health (Apple) =

Health informatics mobile app

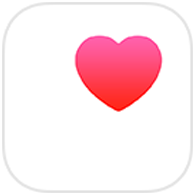

- The Health app in iOS 16
- Developer: Apple
- Release: September 17, 2014; 12 years ago (iOS); September 18, 2023; 3 years ago (iPadOS)
- Operating system: iOS; iPadOS
- Type: Health informatics; physical fitness
- Website: apple.com/health

Health is a health informatics mobile app, announced by Apple on June 2, 2014, at its Worldwide Developers Conference (WWDC). The app is available on iPhone and iPod Touch devices running iOS 8 or later, and on iPads running iPadOS 17 or later. The application collects health data such as blood pressure measurement and glucose levels, but also collects physical tracking data such as step counts. It can pull data from fitness trackers, smartwatches, smart scales, and other devices.

== Features ==
The Health app tracks and stores various health data and metrics, as well as clinical medical records for users with supported health insurers or hospitals signed up to the "Apple Health Records" program. Data is divided into several categories: activity, body measurements, cycle tracking, hearing, heart, medications, mental wellbeing, mobility, nutrition, respiratory, sleep, symptoms, vitals, and other data.

Users with a connected Apple Watch will have their health information from the device automatically imported into the health app including their activity rings, walking and running distances, flights climbed, mindfulness minutes, sleep analysis, handwashing metrics, environmental noise levels, heart rate, blood oxygen levels, and ECG measurements. Health data can also be logged manually or through third-party applications.

Since iOS 13, Health has been capable of period and fertility tracking, allowing users to log their menstruation cycles and receive predictions as to when their next period may begin. With iOS 16, Apple introduced medication logging, which allows users to track the medicines they are taking and set reminders for when to take them, as well as alerting users of potential drug interactions. Both features are also available as standalone applications on watchOS devices. With iOS 17, users can also journal their daily emotions and moods in order to track their mental health, as well as take standardized anxiety and depression tests, which can be useful in knowing if it’s an appropriate time to consult a therapist.

"Medical ID" profiles are also kept within the Health app, which allows for key medical information to be easily accessed by first responders without the need to unlock someone's device. Users can choose to what to display in their Medical ID, such as allergies, medications, blood type, organ donor status, and emergency contact details. As of July 2016, users on iOS 10 or later in the United States have been able to sign up to be an organ, eye, and tissue donor through the Health app.

Initially, the Health app was criticized for its lack of compatible third-party applications (at its release on September 17, 2014, along with iOS 8), glucose tracking, proper health data explanations, and sluggish app performance. Eventually, Apple fixed these issues with software updates. In 2019, the Health app received a redesign as part of iOS 13, which simplified navigation of the app by replacing the dashboard with a summary tab and placing everything else under a "browse" tab, similar to the previous "health data" tab.

Screenshots showcasing a variety of first-party Apple Watch applications which connect directly with the Health app to provide metrics

== Electronic Health Records ==
In 2018, Apple's "Health Records" was introduced, which allowed on iOS 11.3 or later for users to import their medical records from their doctor or hospital.

On June 6, 2019, Northern Louisiana Medical Center announced an early partnership with Apple to allow clinical medical records shared through the app. Shortly after Apple began allowing compatible electronic health records (EHR) to self-register for the "Health Records" project. Other partnerships in 2019 included University of Tennessee Medical Center in Knoxville, Medical Center of South Arkansas; Northwest Health of Springdale, Arkansas; Blessing Health System of Quincy, Illinois; Doylestown Health of Pennsylvania; Franciscan Health; Bayhealth Medical Center of Dover, Delaware, and the Department of Veterans Affairs.

== HealthKit API ==
HealthKit logo

HealthKit is the accompanying developer application programming interface (API) included in the iOS SDK (Software Development Kit) for the Mac. It is used by software developers to design applications that have extensibility and that can interact with the health and fitness applications on iOS.

After the release of iOS 8 on September 17, 2014, Apple removed all HealthKit-compatible apps from its App Store to fix a bug that caused cellular and Touch ID issues, and then re-released Healthkit, with the release of iOS 8.0.2, on September 26, 2014.

As of February 2017, several manufacturers other than Apple sold hardware that was HealthKit enabled.

=== ResearchKit & CareKit APIs ===
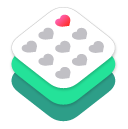
ResearchKit logo

ResearchKit and CareKit are two other health-related software frameworks which Apple have introduced to further build upon the capabilities of HealthKit, allowing software developers to create applications for gathering medical research and following care plans, respectively. Both APIs can interact with the health application and facilitate the sharing of health information between patients and doctors.

Apple has also introduced a standalone research application for iOS and watchOS devices, which allows users to volunteer and participate in long-term research studies run by Apple and various health partners.

== Employees ==
In July 2018, Apple hired cardiologist Alexis Beatty, while working on the Apple Watch and Health integration. David Smoley, former chief information officer of pharmaceutical company AstraZeneca, was hired as a Vice President of Apple in June 2019.

In October 2019, former Columbia University Medical Center cardiologist David Tsay joined Apple Health.

== See also ==
- Apple Fitness
- Fitbod
- Google Fit
- Google Health
- Microsoft HealthVault
- MSN Health & Fitness
