= Xiaomi Tag =

Bluetooth tracker developed by Xiaomi

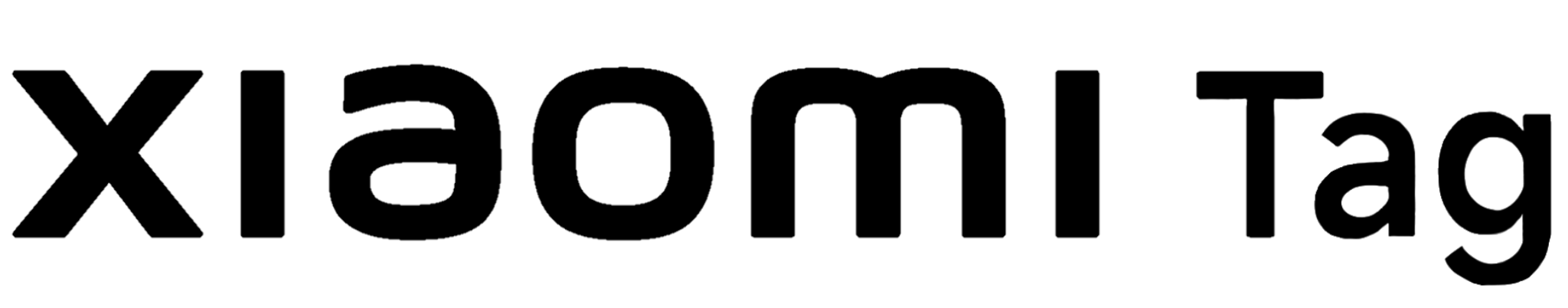
- Developer: Xiaomi
- Manufacturer: Xiaomi
- Type: Bluetooth tracker
- Released: February 28, 2026
- Connectivity: BLE, NFC UWB
- Power: CR2032 battery

The Xiaomi Tag or Xiaomi Tracker is a bluetooth tracker device developed and manufactured by Xiaomi. Its designed to work as a tracker for personal objects (like bags, luggage, keys and more). It was announced globally on February 28 of 2026 in Barcelona, in the Mobile World Congress 2026 (MWC26).

The Xiaomi Tag with a "double-nationality" software compatible with Apple's Find My Network through agreements like the Find My Network Accessory Program. And with the Find Hub Network from Google.

To pair a Xiaomi Tag, whether its a device with Android or iOS/iPadOS, its initial setup for basic use requires hardware capable of running Android 9 (Android Pie) or iOS 14.5 (including later versions). It requires a Google Account or an Apple ID with iCloud set up respectively.

The device has two available versions, the base and global version, that only has Bluetooth Low Energy (BLE) and near-field communication (NFC) technology, and the version compatible with ultra-wideband technology, often referred as the "pro" or "premium" version, only available in the People's Republic of China and in southeast Asian countries.

== Features ==
The user can interact with a Xiaomi Tag in the Find My Device app in Android devices, and in the Find My app in iOS/iPadOS devices. Both can check its approximate location on the map, make the device ring and see the status of the CR2032 battery and mark the device as lost.

Xiaomi Tags are not compatible with the Xiaomi Home app and they will not appear on its device list.

To help avoid unwanted tracking, if a unknown or unregistered Xiaomi Tag moves with a user for a prolonged time, its device, whether its Android or iOS will notify him through the Find My app or Find My Device app respectively

Users can mark their Xiaomi Tags as lost, showing contact information in a temporal web page trough near-field communication if an Android, iOS or Windows 10 Mobile brings their device close to the tracker.

The design and construction of the device consists of a polycarbonate body with metal frames at its edges. The device has Bluetooth 5.4 chip with 100 meters of reach in open spaces. For a proper power, the device has a CR2032 replaceable battery with one year battery life according to its producer. The device has dust and water ingress protection IP67.

== Criticism ==
=== Lack of ultra-wideband (UWB) technology ===
One of the recurrent criticism and limitations of the Xiaomi Tag (on its global version) is the lack of ultra-wideband (UWB) technology in its hardware. Which prevents it from using features like Precision Finding, that require ultra-wideband technology for accuracy, trusting exclusively on Bluetooth 5.4 and its integrated sound to find objects.

== See also ==
- Galaxy SmartTag
- AirTag
- List of UWB-enabled mobile devices
