= List of people from Marin County, California =

This is a list of people from Marin County, California, people born in, raised in, or strongly associated with the county.

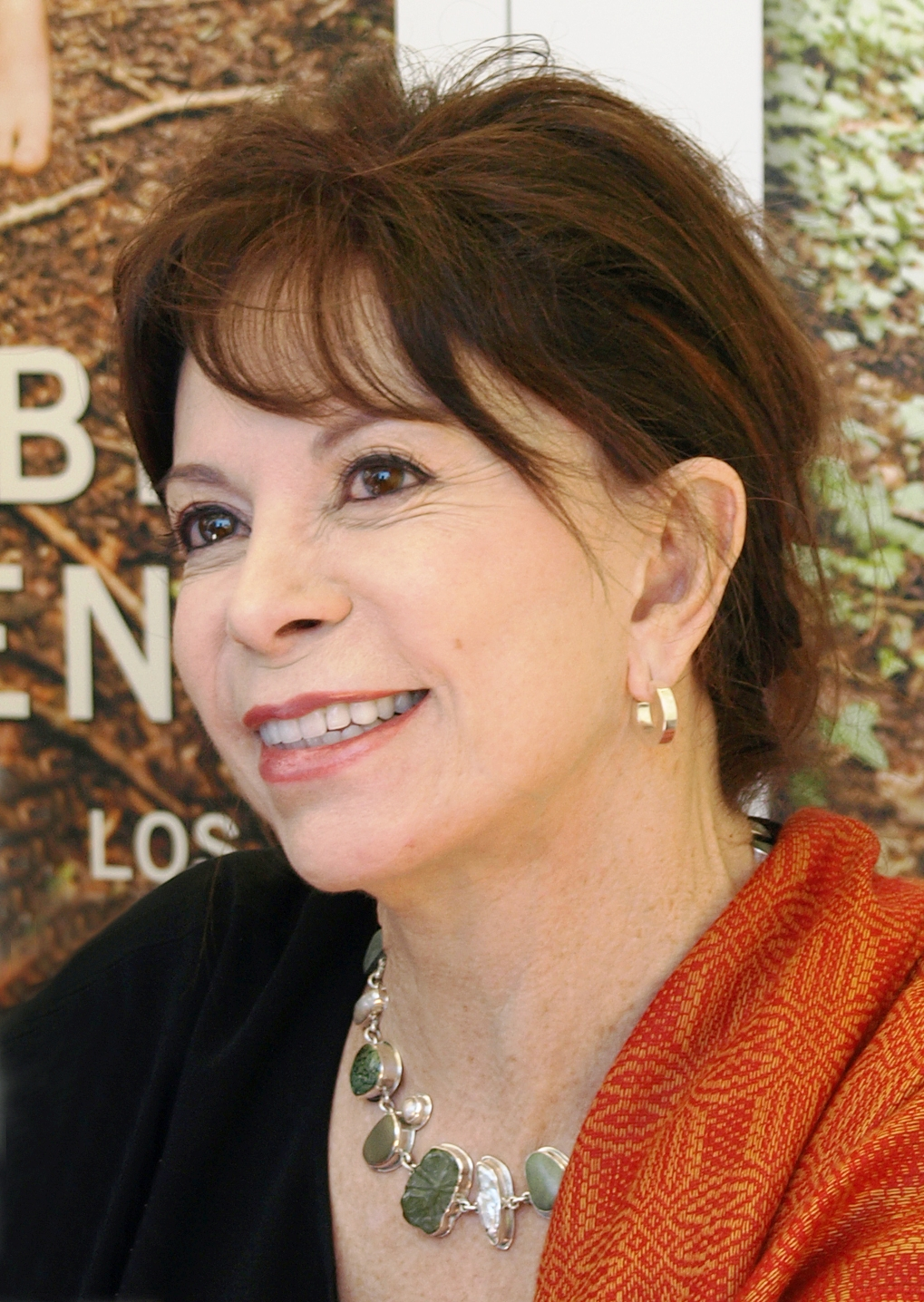
Isabel Allende

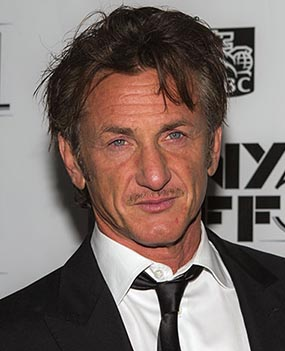
Sean Penn

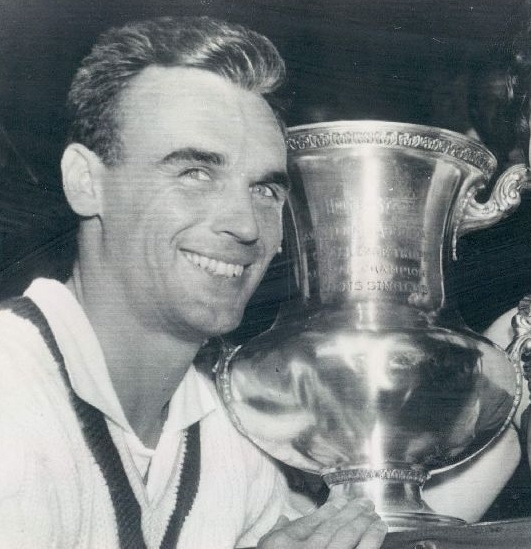
Vic Seixas

- Josh Akognon, basketball player
- Juan Alderete de la Peña, Grammy-winning bassist
- Isabel Allende, writer
- Sam Andrew, musician
- Dave Archer (painter), artist
- Eve Arden (Eunice Quedens), Tamalpais High School, Class of 1926, actress (Our Miss Brooks, Grease)
- Tom Barbash, author
- Arj Barker, comedian
- John Battelle, CEO of Federated Media, founder of Wired magazine, and author of The Search
- Melba Beals, civil rights activist
- Michael Bloomfield, blues guitarist
- Barbara Boxer, former United States Senator
- Terry Bozzio, musician
- Fairuza Balk, actress, born in Point Reyes Station
- Jesse Barish, musician
- Richard Brautigan, author
- Joe Breeze, Tamalpais High School, Class of 1972, mountain bike pioneer and industry leader
- Laurel Burch, artist
- Merritt Butrick, Tamalpais High School, Class of 1977, actor (Square Pegs; James T. Kirk's son, David Marcus, in Star Trek)
- Yvonne Cagle, Novato High School, Class of 1977, M.D., NASA Astronaut
- Gunnar Carlsson, Redwood High School, Class of 1969, Swindells Professor of Mathematics Stanford University
- Pete Carroll, Redwood High School, Class of 1969, head football coach of the Las Vegas Raiders
- Edwin Catmull, President of the Disney–Pixar Studios
- Bill Champlin, Tamalpais High School, Class of 1965, musician, Sons of Champlin, Chicago
- Chris Chaney, Tamalpais High School, Class of 1988, musician, Jane's Addiction, The Panic Channel
- Brenda Chapman, animation director
- Sam Chapman, Tamalpais High School, Class of 1934, athlete (high school and college all star, California Golden Bears; MLB)
- Craig Chaquico, guitarist from Jefferson Starship
- Maxine Chernoff, author
- Julia Child, Katherine Branson School, Class of 1930; host of The French Chef
- John Cipollina, Tamalpais High School, Class of 1964, lead guitarist for Quicksilver Messenger Service
- Signy Coleman, Tamalpais High School, Class of 1978, model, actress
- Elmer Collett, Tamalpais High School, Class of 1962, lineman, NFL
- Jack Conte, musician, Pomplamoose
- Peter Coyote, actor
- Les Crane, radio announcer and talk show host
- David Crosby, musician
- Martin Cruz Smith, author
- Charlie Cunningham, Tamalpais High School, Class of 1967, mountain bike pioneer (Mountain Bike Hall of Fame)
- Jake Curhan (born 1998), American football offensive tackle for the Seattle Seahawks of the National Football League (NFL)
- Ram Dass, author of Be Here Now
- Nataly Dawn, singer, Pomplamoose
- Joe DeMaestri, Tamalpais High School, Class of 1946, MLB shortstop
- Philip K. Dick, science fiction author, lived in Point Reyes Station 1958–1963 and in San Rafael and Santa Venetia through 1972
- Mike Dirnt, bass player, Green Day
- Allen Drury, novelist, 1960 Pulitzer Prize winner, author of Advise and Consent
- George Duke, Tamalpais High School, Class of 1963, jazz pianist
- David Dukes, actor, Redwood High School
- Louis Durra, jazz pianist
- Clint Eastwood, actor and director
- Dave Eggers, author
- Daniel Ellsberg, whistle blower, writer and anti-war activist
- Mike "SuperJew" Epstein, Major League Baseball player
- Joe Eszterhas, screenwriter
- Cerridwen Fallingstar, historical novelist and Wiccan priestess
- Mimi Farina, musician, singer, non-profit director and sister of Joan Baez and widow of Richard Farina
- Jake Farrow, actor and writer
- David Fincher, film director
- Jack Finney, author, The Body Snatchers, Time and Again
- Gary Fisher, mountain biking pioneer
- Jon Fisher, entrepreneur
- Ken Flax, Olympic athlete, hammer throw
- Tyler Florence, celebrity chef
- Phil Frank, cartoonist
- David Freiberg, musician
- Jerry Garcia, musician, of The Grateful Dead
- Leonard Gardner, novelist, author of Fat City
- Adriana Giramonti, chef
- Jared Goff, Marin Catholic High School, Class of 2013, quarterback, NFL
- Bill Graham, promoter and founder of the Fillmore West in San Francisco
- David Grisman, mandolinist and composer
- Pete Gross, broadcaster for Seattle Seahawks
- Gary Gruber, physicist, educator, and author, Gruber's Complete Guide series for standardized test preparation
- Sammy Hagar, singer
- Anna Halprin, choreographer
- Oren Harari, business professor at University of San Francisco, author, speaker
- David Haskell, Terra Linda High School, Class of 1966, actor
- Annette Haven, ex-porn star
- S. I. Hayakawa, semanticist, president of San Francisco State University, US Senator (1977–1983)
- Sterling Hayden, actor
- Matt Hazeltine, Tamalpais High School, Class of 1951, linebacker, NFL
- Mariel Hemingway, actress, born in Mill Valley
- Jon Hendricks, jazz lyricist, singer
- George Herms, Beat Artist, museum director
- James Hetfield, Metallica lead singer, rhythm guitar
- J. R. Hildebrand, auto racing driver
- George Hill, four-time national pairs figure skating champion
- Lester Holt, NBC News anchor
- Tess Uriza Holthe, author
- Tony Hsieh, CEO of Zappos.com
- Chris Hulls, co-founder of Life360
- Tessa Hulls, artist
- Zakir Hussain, musician, San Anselmo
- Sam Vogel Jauz, American DJ/Music Producer
- Maz Jobrani, comedian and actor
- Booker T. Jones, musician
- Janis Joplin, singer; her last known residence was in Larkspur, California
- Isabelle Keith, actress
- Charlie Kelly, Tamalpais High School, Class of 1963, roadie (Sons of Champlin); Mountain Bike Hall of Fame
- Ali Akbar Khan, musician, Ali Akbar Khan College of Music
- Lisa Kindred, blues and folk singer and guitarist
- Klaus Kinski, actor (died in the Marin County town of Lagunitas)
- Harmony Korine, film director, (born in Bolinas)
- Walter Egel Kuhlman, abstract expressionist artist
- Jef Labes, keyboardist
- Travis LaBoy, Marin Catholic High School, Class of 1999, linebacker, NFL
- Ned Lagin, artist, photographer, scientist, composer, and keyboardist
- Anne Lamott, writer
- Jim Lange, TV game show host (The Dating Game)
- John Lasseter, film director and Disney executive
- Anton Szandor LaVey (Howard Stanton Levey), Tamalpais High School, Class of ~1947, founder of Church of Satan
- Ralph Lazar, artist
- Bill Lee, Terra Linda High School, Class of 1964, MLB pitcher
- John Leslie Nuzzo, pornographic actor and director
- Barry Levinson, film director
- Jane Levy, actress (Suburgatory)
- Huey Lewis, singer
- Kevin Lima, film director
- Tim Lincecum, baseball player
- John Walker Lindh, American who fought for the Taliban
- Mary Tuthill Lindheim, sculptor, studio potter, and a planner of the Sausalito Art Fair
- Sacheen Littlefeather, political activist
- Sondra Locke, actress and director
- Ki Longfellow (born Pamela Longfellow), Redwood High School in Larkspur, CA; author of The Secret Magdalene, Flow Down Like Silver, Hypatia of Alexandria
- George Lucas, film director, founder of Lucasfilm and Industrial Light & Magic. Creator of Star Wars and Indiana Jones franchises. Owner of Skywalker Ranch
- Andy Luckey, Redwood High School, Class of 1983, television producer, author, illustrator
- Ray Lynch, composer and mathematician
- Seán Mac Falls, poet
- Mike Machette, tennis player
- Peter Magadini, drummer, composer
- Duster Mails, MLB pitcher; appeared in 1920 World Series
- Zekial Marko, pulp fiction writer, film & television series writer
- Brian Maxwell, marathon runner and, with his wife to be, Jennifer Biddulph, developer and founder of Powerbar
- Joyce Maynard, author
- Montgomery McFate, anthropologist, chief social scientist for Human Terrain System
- Terry McGovern, actor, voice, radio, Director of Marin Actors' Workshop
- Ron "Pigpen" McKernan, musician, of The Grateful Dead
- Bridgit Mendler, actress
- Tom Merritt, technology journalist and broadcaster
- Artie Mitchell, pornographic film producer
- Van Morrison, singer and songwriter
- Jonny Moseley, gold medal-winning Olympic skier
- Maria Muldaur, singer-songwriter, "Midnight at the Oasis"
- Walter Murch, film editor
- Gavin Newsom, former mayor of San Francisco, current Governor of California
- Connie Nielsen, actress
- Eric Norstad, ceramicist and architect
- Don Novello, actor and writer
- Phil Ochs, singer, songwriter
- Arthur Okamura, screen print artist illustrator
- Karl Olson, Tamalpais High School, MLB outfielder
- George Demont Otis, artist
- William L. Patterson, Tamalpais High School, Class of 1911, attorney; civil rights pioneer
- Pat Paulsen, Tamalpais High School, Class of 1945, statesman; comic, The Smothers Brothers Comedy Hour
- Sean Penn, actor, activist
- Jacquie Phelan, mountain biking pioneer and racing champion; now freelance cycle skills trainer and writer
- Kathleen Quinlan, Tamalpais High School, Class of 1972, actress (American Graffiti, Apollo 13, Oliver Stone's The Doors)
- Bill Rafferty, former game show host, comedian
- Bonnie Raitt, singer
- Reminisce, street artist, sculptor
- Marc Reisner, environmentalist, author
- Howard Rheingold, author
- Meghan Rienks, actress
- Hal Riney, advertising executive
- Jason Roberts, author
- Pernell Roberts, actor, civil rights activist
- Chris Robinson (singer), singer, The Black Crowes
- Brande Roderick, model and actress
- Prince Andrew Romanov, Russian royal and artist
- Dennis B. Ross, U.S. diplomat and author
- George H. Ruge, San Francisco radio pioneer
- Joe Ryan Major League Baseball player for the Minnesota Twins
- Kay Ryan, United States Poet Laureate
- Dana Sabraw, U.S. District Judge
- Mort Sahl, comedian
- Carlos Santana, musician
- Aram Saroyan, poet
- Strawberry Saroyan, novelist
- Michael Savage, conservative radio host
- Eric P. Schmitt, journalist, Pulitzer Prize winner
- Charles R. Schwab, investor
- Erik Scott, award-winning bass player, musician, writer, producer
- Vic Seixas (born 1923), Hall of Fame top-10 tennis player
- Tupac Shakur, Tamalpais High School, rapper, poet, and actor
- Peter Shor, Tamalpais High School, mathematician, MIT; MacArthur Fellow
- Grace Slick, musician, Jefferson Airplane, Jefferson Starship
- Gary Snyder, poet
- Tom Snyder, television talk host
- Myron Spaulding, boat designer and builder, sailboat racer and concert violinist
- John Stewart, musician, songwriter, Kingston Trio
- David Strathairn, Redwood High School, actor
- Nicholas Suntzeff, Redwood High School, cosmologist, Texas A&M, Gruber Prize in Cosmology
- Lisa Swerling, artist
- Amy Tan, author
- Gage Taylor, visionary artist
- Dina Temple-Raston, journalist for National Public Radio, author
- Twinka Thiebaud, writer and model
- Bill Thompson, Manager of Jefferson Airplane
- Courtney Thorne-Smith, Tamalpais High School, Class of 1985, actress (Melrose Place, Ally McBeal, According to Jim)
- Scott Thunes, musician
- Peter Tork, musician, member of The Monkees
- Lars Ulrich, Metallica drummer
- Lee Unkrich, employee at Pixar and director of Toy Story 3
- Jean Varda, artist
- Max Venable, baseball player for the San Francisco Giants
- Will Venable, baseball player for the San Diego Padres
- Winston Venable, football player for the Chicago Bears
- Vendela Vida, author
- John L. Wasserman, San Francisco Chronicle entertainment critic
- Alan Watts, writer
- Cassandra Webb (Cassandra Politzer), Tamalpais High School, Class of 1976, actress (Starship, Sons and Daughters)
- Bob Weir, vocalist, rhythm guitarist, and founding member of Grateful Dead
- Lou Welch, poet
- Brett Wickens, designer
- Archie Williams, 1936 Summer Olympics 400m winner
- Robin Williams, actor, Flubber, Mrs. Doubtfire, Redwood High School graduate
- Tony Williams, drummer
- Cintra Wilson, Tamalpais High School, writer
- Robin Wright, actress
- Jesse Colin Young, singer-songwriter of 1970s and 1980s, "Song for Julia"
- Saul Zaentz, film producer
- Barry Zito, baseball player
