= Samsung Galaxy SmartTag =

Key finder

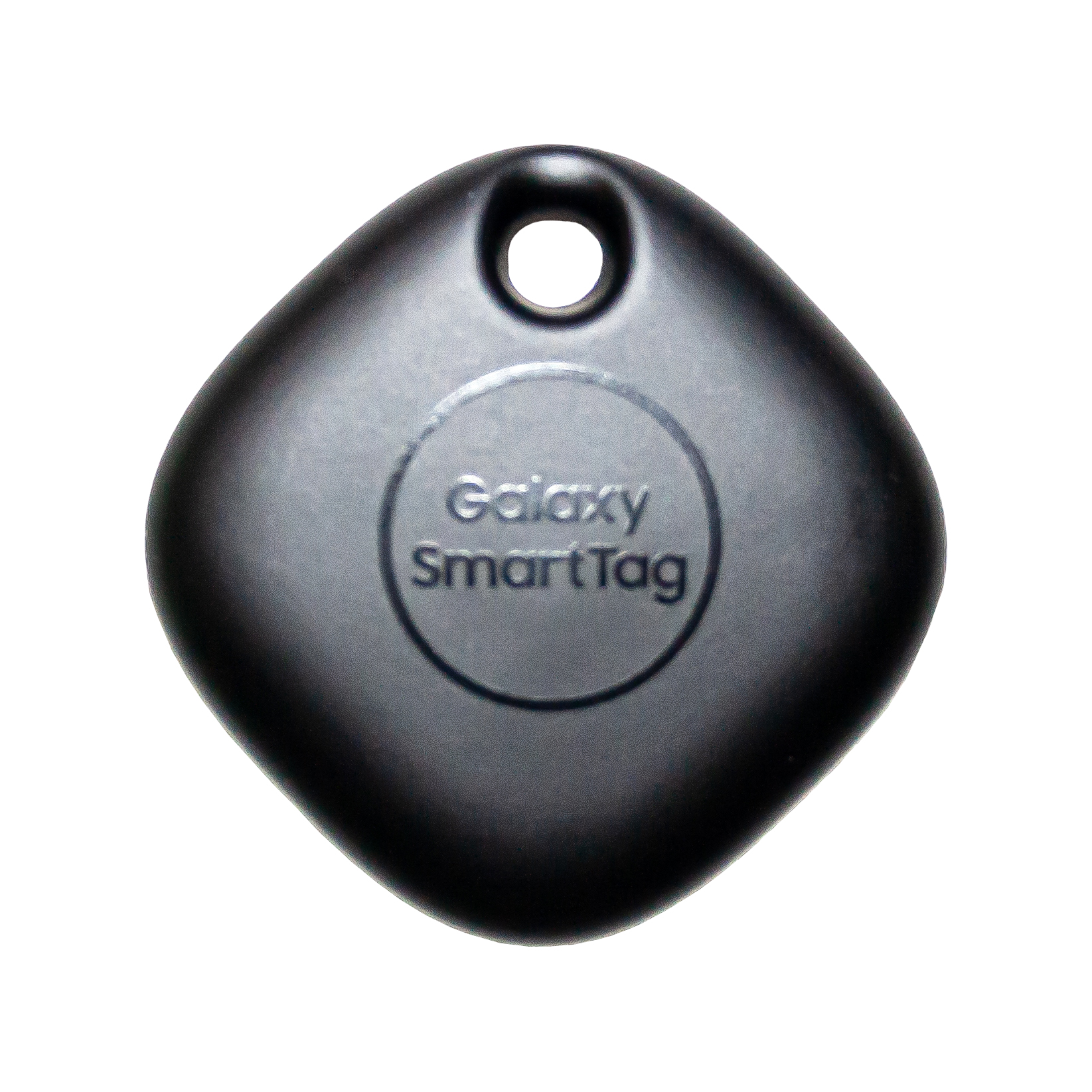
- The first generation of the Galaxy SmartTag lineup, featuring several of the same AirTag features
- Manufacturer: Samsung
- Type: Key finder
- Generation: First generation of SmartTag lineup
- Released: Announced on January 14, 2021; 5 years ago
- Availability: SmartTag released since January 29, 2021; 5 years ago. SmartTag Plus released since April 14, 2021; 5 years ago. SmartTag2 released since October 11, 2023; 3 years ago.
- Introductory price: US$29 for SmartTag; $39 for SmartTag+; $27 for SmartTag2
- Connectivity: Bluetooth Low Energy; Ultra-wideband
- Power: CR2032 button cell
- Online services: SmartThings Find network Samsung Find
- Dimensions: 1.54 in (39 mm) x 1.54 in (39 mm); Thickness: 0.39 in (9.9 mm)
- Weight: 13 g (0.46 oz)
- Website: SmartTag2

The Samsung Galaxy SmartTag is a smart tracker and object finder produced by Samsung Electronics. The device utilizes Bluetooth Low Energy to allow the user to locate whatever object it is linked to via the SmartThings mobile app. The SmartTag & SmartTag+ were announced at Samsung's Galaxy Unpacked event on January 14, 2021, SmartTag was included with every Galaxy S21 for pre-order, and released on January 29, 2021. The SmartTag+ announced again at Samsung Newsroom on April 8, 2021, and released on April 14th. On October 11, 2023, Samsung released the SmartTag2 with improvements on battery life and tracking. On 30 September 2026, Samsung followed it with the smaller and lighter SmartTag3.

== Function ==
The Galaxy SmartTag is a tracking device which can be attached to various objects that are easily lost with a small strap (sold separately) or by other means, such as a keychain. Objects include keys, luggage, purses, among others. The device can then be located with SmartThings mobile app, using Bluetooth LE. Another variant, the Galaxy SmartTag+, uses ultra-wideband technology in order to locate the device and was released on April 16, 2021. Only a limited number of phone models, which are more recently produced, manufactured by Samsung support such features. While the device is inside of the Bluetooth range (120 meters), it can play a ringtone using its inbuilt piezoelectric speaker to alert the user of its exact location audibly, using a volume between 85 - 96 dB (unobstructed). If the device is outside of the Bluetooth LE range, the device can still be located using Samsung's SmartThings Find Network, which uses the internet connection and GPS location of other Samsung Galaxy phones in the area to anonymously pinpoint the location of the SmartTag to the owner. The device also has a programmable button that can be used to control SmartThings-compatible smart-home products.

The Samsung Galaxy SmartTag2 was released on October 11th 2023. This is the second generation in the SmartTag lineup, and has been improved overall. The new design is better for keyrings, less thick, and not bulging in the middle. The louder speaker also allows for better audible clarity. It also features refreshed Bluetooth LE antennas, but still runs off of the same SmartThings Find Network. The longer battery life also allows it to be used for longer. A programmable NFC tag also allows the owner to set a custom lost message with contact details and instructions.

The SmartThings Find Network allows Galaxy devices that have opted in, don't have airplane mode or data saver mode on, and are in Bluetooth range to anonymously send the location of the tracker to the owner. It all happens in the background, and anonymously, so it updates seamlessly.

SmartThings has introducted several pet tracking options for the SmartTag lineup, such as SmartThings Pet Care, which can track ones pets walk and report it to the SmartThings mobile app.

== See also ==
- Tile (company)
- TrackR
- AirTag
- Xiaomi Tag
- List of UWB-enabled devices
