= Life360 =

Location based app for families

- Company type: Public
- Traded as: ASX: 360; Nasdaq: LIF; S&P 600 component
- Founded: April 17, 2007; 19 years ago
- Headquarters: San Mateo, California, United States
- Key people: Chris Hulls (Executive Director, Co-founder, and Chief Executive Officer); Alex Haro (Executive Director, Co-Founder, and President); John Philip Coghlan (Independent Non-Executive Chair)
- Revenue: ▲US$228.3 million (2022)
- Subsidiaries: Tile (company)
- Website: life360.com
- Users: ▲100 million monthly active users (MAU) (August 2026)
- Current status: Active
- Native clients on: Android; iOS; Windows

Life360 Family Locator—GPS Tracker (Android) Find My Family, Friends, Phone (iOS)
- Developer: Life360
- Release: 2008; 18 years ago (Android); 2010; 16 years ago (iOS)
Stable release
- Android: 25.42.1 / October 30, 2025; 12 months ago
- iOS: 25.43.1 / October 30, 2025; 12 months ago
- Operating system: iOS 17.2 and later Android 10 and later Windows Phone
- Size: 120.5 MB iOS; 35 MB Android
- Available in: Spanish, German, Korean, Italian, Russian, Portuguese, and Indonesian (2014)
- Type: Location-based service
- License: Proprietary
- Website: www.life360.com

Life360, Inc. is an American information technology company that provides GPS tracking and other location-based services, including sharing and notifications, to consumers globally. The company is based in San Mateo, California. Its main service is called Life360, a family social networking app released in 2008. It is a location-based service designed primarily to enable friends and family members to share their location with each other.

== History ==
Life360, Inc. was founded on April 17, 2007 by Chris Hulls and Alex Haro. It has received a total of $90 million in funding since its launch, including funding from both Facebook and Google. The first funding for Life360 came in the form of a $275,000 grant as a winner of Google's 2008 Android Developer Challenge. Additional funding included $5.5 million in a Series A round, $17 million in a Series B round, and $50 million in a Series C round. Before going public, the company secured a total of 36 investors including Regal Funds Management, Sunstone Management, and several others.

The app was initially released in 2009 in the Android marketplace.

Life360 entered into an agreement with BMW in 2013 to integrate the location services of Life360 with BMW ConnectedDrive telematics and navigation features. The same year, Life360 surpassed Foursquare in the number of registered users with 34 million and reached more than 40 million registered users the same year. Life360 also saw an increase in user registration following the announcement from Google that they would be shutting down their Google Latitude platform in August 2013.

In 2013, Life360 announced it would be adding global support for its app.

In 2016, Life360 added a telematics feature that enables smartphones to detect when people are in a car crash and automatically contacts emergency response. In February 2016, Life360 acquired the private messaging application and Y Combinator grad "Couple" based in Mountain View, California.

At CES in January 2018, ADT announced ADT Go in partnership with Life360. ADT Go connects and protects families outside the home, utilizing ADT's expansive security infrastructure.

In May 2019, Life360 listed on the Australian Securities Exchange (ASX) under the ticker "360", raising proceeds totaling AU$145.4 million. The majority of the funds raised are to be used to grow the business globally and develop home insurance and home security products, along with motor vehicle insurance sold directly to service its customers.

In November 2019, the company acquired ZenScreen, a San Jose, California–based app that guides users and their families to track and attain screen time habits for a more balanced digital diet, for an undisclosed sum. By December 2019, Life360 surpassed 27 million monthly active users (MAUs).

In November 2021, Life360 agreed to acquire Tile, an asset tracking company, in a $205 million acquisition, and later announced integration of the two services, expanding Tile's tracking reach.

== People ==
As of July 2026, co-founder Chris Hulls is executive chairman and CEO of the company. Co-founder Alex Harris is executive director and president and John Philip Coghlan is independent non-executive chair.

== Features ==
Life360 is a mobile application and was referred to as a "family-oriented private social network" by Bloomberg Businessweek. The app is a social network for families and differentiates itself in this way as it is not based around peer groups or professional networks such as Find My and LinkedIn. It allows users to share locations, group message, and call for roadside assistance.

It has four main features: location sharing, circles, places, and premium.

=== Location sharing ===
The main feature of the app is location sharing, which functions as a personal tracking system. Users can open the app and see where other members are instantly. Users can choose whether to share their location with any particular circle at any particular time.

=== Circles ===
Circles is the app's newest feature, released on September 3, 2013. Circles allows users to create separate groups within the app, e.g. "caregivers", "extended family", and "John's baseball team." Users' location is only visible to those who are also in the circle, and members in "caregivers" cannot see the location of users in "extended family", unless they are also in that circle.

=== Places ===
Life360 allows users to create geofences that alert them when another enters or leaves another location.

=== Premium ===
Life360 operates as a freemium app, and users can pay for extra features. These extra features include: stolen phone insurance, access to a live advisor 24/7, unlimited creation of "Places", and emergency roadside assistance (known as 'Driver Protect').

=== Bubbles ===
Following CEO Chris Hulls' creation of a TikTok account to initiate a dialogue with teenagers due to intense criticism of the company, Life360 released Bubbles, a feature that allows users to share only their approximate location inside a certain region. Each Bubble can be configured with a radius of between 1 and 25 miles and a set duration of 1 to 6 hours. Despite only the approximate location being shared, safety features and messaging features remain active.

=== Additional features ===
Life360 supports Tile trackers. This allows users to link their Tile account or add Tile trackers directly.

As of 2014, the app was available in Spanish, German, Korean, Italian, Russian, Portuguese, and Indonesian.

== Criticism ==
An article by The Washington Post claims that parents are using the location sharing feature to track their teenage and adult children "in ways that resemble emotional abuse."

An article by The Markup reported that Life360 sells its users' precise location data to data brokers. According to Life360's privacy policy, this data "does not reasonably identify you directly". The company later claimed it was no longer selling this type of data.

While tracking devices like Life360's Tile and Apple's AirTag were intended to help users find missing or stolen property, they have also been used maliciously, such as to stalk people. In August 2023, stalking victims filed a class-action lawsuit against Tile, Life360 and business partner Amazon for essentially promoting stalking, specifically "negligence, defective design, unjust enrichment, intrusion, and multiple privacy law violations".

A 2024 Sky News story characterised Life360 as "stalkerware".

== Awards and recognition ==
Life360 has received multiple awards including funding as winner of both Google Android Developer Challenge and Facebook fbFund. It received the People's Voice Award for Best Use of GPS or Location Technology at the 2012 Webby Awards. The same year it received the Reader's Choice Award from About.com as the Coolest Parenting Teens Gadget Winner.
