= Adero =

Adero may refer to:

- Nyakisi Adero (born 1986), Ugandan long distance runner
- Adero, or TrackR, tracking technology
