= List of UWB-enabled mobile devices =

Ultra-wideband (UWB, ultra wideband, ultra-wide band, or ultraband) is a radio technology that can use a very low energy level for short-range, high-bandwidth communications over a large portion of the radio spectrum. The following is a list of devices that support the technology from various UWB silicon providers.

== Smartphones, foldables and tablets ==
Brand	Device name	Availability	Platform	Release date	Compatible asset tracking network	UWB Controller
Apple	iPhone 11	All models	iOS	2019 September	Apple's Find My	Apple U1
Apple	iPhone 12	All models	iOS	2020 October	Apple's Find My	Apple U1
Apple	iPhone 13	All models	iOS	2021 September	Apple's Find My	Apple U1
Apple	iPhone 14	All models	iOS	2022 September/October	Apple's Find My	Apple U1
Apple	iPhone 15	All models	iOS	2023 September	Apple's Find My	Apple U2
Apple	iPhone 16	All models except 16e	iOS	2024 September	Apple's Find My	Apple U2
Apple	iPhone 17	All models except 17e	iOS	2025 September	Apple's Find My	Apple U2
Apple	iPhone 18	Confirmation for Pro models only	iOS	2026 September	Apple's Find My	Apple U2
Apple	iPhone Air		iOS	2025 September	Apple's Find My	Apple U2
Apple	iPhone Duo		iOS	2026 October	Apple's Find My	Apple U2
Blackview	BV8900 Pro		Android	2023 December		GiantSemi GT1500
Google	Pixel 6	Pro model only	Android	2021 October	Google's Find My Device	Qorvo DW3720
Google	Pixel 7	Pro model only	Android	2022 October	Google's Find My Device	
Google	Pixel 8	Pro model only	Android	2023 October	Google's Find My Device	Qorvo QM35725
Google	Pixel 9	Pro, Pro XL, and Pro Fold models only	Android	2024 September	Google's Find My Device	Qorvo QM35725
Google	Pixel 10	Pro, Pro XL, and Pro Fold models only	Android	2025 August/October	Google's Find My Device	Samsung S3JU100
Google	Pixel 11	Pro, Pro XL, and Pro Fold models only	Android	2026 August	Google's Find My Device	
Google	Pixel Fold	All models	Android	2023 June	Google's Find My Device	
Google	Pixel Tablet	All models	Android	2023 June	Google's Find My Device	
Huawei	Mate XT		Android	2024 September	Harmony OS	
Huawei	Mate XTs		Android	2025 September	Harmony OS	
Meizu	20	Infinity model only	Android	2023 June	Google's Find My Device	NXP SR100T
Meizu	22	1TB+16GB model only	Android	2025 September	Google's Find My Device	
Motorola	Edge 50	Ultra model only	Android	2024 April	Google's Find My Device	
Motorola	Razr 60 2025	Ultra model only	Android	2025 May	Google's Find My Device	
Motorola	Razr 2025	Ultra model only	Android	2025 May	Google's Find My Device	
Motorola	Signature		Android	2026 Jan	Google's Find My Device	
NIO	Phone 2	2024 July	Android	Qorvo UWB SoC	Google's Find My Device	
Samsung	Galaxy Note20	Note 5G and Ultra model only	Android	2020 August	SmartThings Find, Google's Find My Device	NXP SR100T
Samsung	Galaxy S21	Plus (+) and Ultra models only	Android	2021 January	SmartThings Find, Google's Find My Device	NXP SR100T
Samsung	Galaxy S22	Plus (+) and Ultra models only	Android	2022 February	SmartThings Find, Google's Find My Device	NXP SR100T
Samsung	Galaxy S23	Plus (+) and Ultra models only	Android	2023 February	SmartThings Find, Google's Find My Device	
Samsung	Galaxy S24	Plus (+) and Ultra models only	Android	2024 January	SmartThings Find, Google's Find My Device	NXP SR200T
Samsung	Galaxy S25	Plus (+), Ultra, and Edge models only	Android	2025 February/2025 May	SmartThings Find, Google's Find My Device	
Samsung	Galaxy S26	Plus (+) and Ultra models only	Android	2026 March	SmartThings Find, Google's Find My Device	Qualcomm FastConnect™ 7900
Samsung	Galaxy Z Flip7	South Korean model only	Android	2025 July	SmartThings Find, Google's Find My Device	
Samsung	Galaxy Z Fold2		Android	2020 September	SmartThings Find, Google's Find My Device	NXP SR100T
Samsung	Galaxy Z Fold3		Android	2021 August	SmartThings Find, Google's Find My Device	NXP SR100T
Samsung	Galaxy Z Fold4		Android	2022 August	SmartThings Find, Google's Find My Device	
Samsung	Galaxy Z Fold5		Android	2023 August	SmartThings Find, Google's Find My Device	
Samsung	Galaxy Z Fold6		Android	2024 July	SmartThings Find, Google's Find My Device	
Samsung	Galaxy Z Fold7		Android	2025 July	SmartThings Find, Google's Find My Device	
Samsung	Galaxy Z Fold8	All models	Android	2026 August	SmartThings Find, Google's Find My Device	
Samsung	Galaxy Z TriFold		Android	2025 December	SmartThings Find, Google's Find My Device	
Sharp	AQUOS R8	Japan only	Android	2023 July	Google's Find My Device	NXP SR100T
Xiaomi	MIX4		Android	2021 September	Google's Find My Device	NXP SR100T
Xiaomi	Mix Flip		Android	2024 July	Google's Find My Device	TBD
Xiaomi	Poco F9	Pro, Ultra	Android	2026 September	Google's Find My Device	Qualcomm Fast connect 7900
Xiaomi	15s	Pro	Android	2025, May 22	Google's Find My Device	NXP SR200T
Xiaomi	Xiaomi 17	Pro, Pro Max (China version)	Android	2025 September	Google's Find My Device	
Xiaomi	Xiaomi 17	Ultra (China version), Ultra by Leica	Android	2025 December	Google's Find My Device	
Xiaomi	Xiaomi 18 Fold		Android	2026 September	Google's Find My Device	

== Smartwatches ==
Brand	Device name	Platform	Release date	Compatible asset tracking network	UWB Controller
Apple	Watch Series 6	watchOS	2020 September	Apple's Find My	Apple U1
Apple	Watch Series 7	watchOS	2021 October	Apple's Find My	Apple U1
Apple	Watch Series 8	watchOS	2022 September	Apple's Find My	Apple U1
Apple	Watch Series 9	watchOS	2023 September	Apple's Find My	Apple U2
Apple	Watch Series 10	watchOS	2024 September	Apple's Find My	Apple U2
Apple	Watch Series 11	watchOS	2025 September	Apple's Find My	Apple U2
Apple	Watch Series 12	watchOS	2026 September	Apple's Find My	
Apple	Watch Ultra	watchOS	2022 September	Apple's Find My	Apple U1
Apple	Watch Ultra 2	watchOS	2023 September	Apple's Find My	Apple U2
Apple	Watch Ultra 3	watchOS	2025 September	Apple's Find My	Apple U2
Apple	Watch Ultra 4	watchOS	2026 September	Apple's Find My	
Google	Pixel Watch 3	Wear OS	2024 September	Google's Find My Device	NXP SR100T
Google	Pixel Watch 4	Wear OS	2025 October	Google's Find My Device	
Google	Pixel Watch 5	Wear OS	2026 August	Google's Find My Device	

== IoT devices ==
Brand	Device name	Compatible platform(s)	Release date	Availability	Compatible asset tracking network	UWB Controller
Apple	HomePod Mini	iOS 16.3, iPadOS 16.3 or later	2020 November		Apple's Find My	Apple U1
Apple	HomePod (2nd generation)	iOS 16.3, iPadOS 16.3 or later	2023 January		Apple's Find My	Apple U1
Apple	AirTag	iOS 14.5, iPadOS 14.5 or later	2021 April		Apple's Find My	Apple U1
Apple	AirTag (2nd generation)	iOS 26.2.1 or later	2026 January		Apple's Find My	Apple U2
Apple	AirPods Pro 2	iOS 16, iPadOS 16 or later	2022 September	Case only	Apple's Find My	Apple U1
Apple	AirPods Pro 2 (USB-C version)	iOS 17, iPadOS 17 or later	2023 September	Case only	Apple's Find My	Apple U1
Apple	AirPods Pro 3	iOS 26, iPadOS 26 or later	2025 September	Case only	Apple's Find My	Apple U2
Blackview	Blackview BV8900 Pro UWB tag		2023 December		Blackview UWB app	Giant Semi GT1500
Changhong	Neo Tag		2025 October		Google's Find My Device	NXP
Google	Pixel Tag	Android 9 or later	2026 November		Google's Find My Device	
Motorola	Moto Tag		2024 August		Google's Find My Device	Qorvo DW3210
Motorola	Moto Tag 2		2026 March		Google's Find My Device	GiantSemi GT1500
Samsung	Galaxy SmartTag	OneUI 3 (Android 11) or later	2021 April	Plus (+) model only	SmartThings Find	NXP SR040
Samsung	Galaxy SmartTag2	OneUI 3 (Android 11) or later	2023 October		SmartThings Find	NXP SR040
Samsung	Galaxy Buds2 Pro	OneUI 3 (Android 11) or later	2022 August		SmartThings Find	
Xiaomi	Xiaomi Tag		2026 January (China Only)		Google's Find My Device	
