= GFPS =

GFPS may refer to:

- Grand Forks Public Schools, the public school system of Grand Forks, North Dakota
- Great Falls Public Schools, the public school system of Great Falls, Montana
- Geranylfarnesyl diphosphate synthase, an enzyme
- Google Fast Pair Service (GFPS), standard for quickly pair Bluetooth devices when they come in close proximity for the first time
