= Zombie Cafe =

2011 video game

- Developers: Beeline Interactive, Inc.
- Publisher: Capcom
- Platforms: iOS; Android
- Release: iOS; January 26, 2011; Android; April 11, 2012
- Genre: Simulator
- Modes: Single-player, multiplayer

Zombie Cafe was a freemium mobile simulation video game created by American Capcom subsidiary Beeline Interactive, Inc. It was released on January 26, 2011 for Android and iOS. In the game, players managed a café by cooking dishes and serving customers with the help of zombies. Players could turn customers into zombies, who then became employees. Players gained experience by cooking and serving dishes. There were a variety of menu items, each differing in price, number of servings, and preparation time. As the restaurant built up savings, the player could purchase new recipes and furnishings, and could infect more customers. The player could also purchase pets and expand their restaurant. Along with growing the business, players could send their zombies to raid enemy cafés to obtain new recipes.

The game is no longer available for download on either the App Store or the Google Play store, having been removed from both platforms.

== Gameplay ==
The staff in the restaurant was made up of zombies. The restaurant's customers could be transformed into zombies to serve food and collect dirty plates, but the player needed to avoid overworking their zombies. If their Energy levels became too low, they would start attacking customers, lowering the café's rating. A low-Energy zombie needed to rest for a period of time; alternatively, the player could instantly replenish the zombie's Energy levels with a currency called Toxin.

=== Dishes ===
Dishes were the main source of income in Zombie Cafe. Dishes varied by cooking time, cost, number of servings, and number of Experience points given. By raiding other cafés, players could loot prepared dishes and unlock new recipes. Dishes looted from rival cafés would appear in the player's fridge, from which they could either be served or used to unlock new recipes. Dishes required a chef or zombie to be cooked, but could be paused and resumed at any time. However, if the player left a stove unattended for a long enough time or ignored it after it finished cooking, the dish would burn, wasting it.

There were 9 different dish variations: Spicy, Very Spicy, Fancy, Very Fancy, Bulk, Fresh, Frozen, Quick, and Very Quick. These special variations were more valuable than their normal counterparts. Each could be unlocked through raiding enemy cafés or through a friend's café (if already unlocked by the player's friends).

To defeat a café, the zombies needed to defeat the raid boss. Players could also have their zombies retreat by clicking/tapping on a white flag icon on the upper left hand corner. If the raid is unsuccessful, the player did not receive the recipe but could receive Cash if the zombies eat any customers or employees.

=== Customers ===
Customers were the people who consume the dishes and give money to the player. There were many types of customers with varying appearance, gender, and occupation. Customers could be human or appear as supernatural beings such as mummies, vampires, aliens, superheroes, deities, and legendary creatures. Some characters in the game were based upon living persons or fictional characters. The types of customer that would visit the café depended on the player's level and the café's current rating. The player could infect any customer to become a zombie employee, with higher-level customers having improved abilities. Customers first encountered from the tutorial were usually free, but higher-level customers cost the player varying amounts of in-game money or Toxin to infect.

=== Café rating ===
The café rating showed the reputation of the player's café, indicated by stars on the upper left hand corner. The higher a café's rating, the more popular a café became, increasing the number and quality of customers that appeared. When customers finished their food and paid, thought bubbles appeared above their heads to indicate their feelings about the service, which affected ratings. By making customers happy, the star rating would increase and more customers would appear, giving the player more money. If customers were not satisfied or were attacked by an Energy-deprived zombie, the café rating would drop, causing fewer customers to appear. A café needed to have enough seats and number of dishes to accommodate customers. If a customer arrived while the café was full, they would leave unhappy. Depending on the size of the café, the player may have needed more seats, more utilities, and more zombie servers to speed up the serving process. Certain items from the store would grant the café a rating bonus. Green blinking stars indicated that a café rating had increased during a player's absence and red blinking stars indicated that the café rating had decreased in the player's absence.

There was a feature from Zombie Cafe which functioned similar to reviews. It became available when the player's café reached level 6. By completing four tasks in the "to do" list, the chef's café rating would gain a purple bonus star for a limited time. While in effect, bonus stars would remain even when the café's rating drops. Up to three bonus stars could be obtained at a time. The tasks were selected randomly from either raiding, serving, cooking, spending money on the café, or collecting fees from friends. If the player had friends playing the game, the tasks would shift towards doing business involving their friends. After completing the four objectives, the player would gain one bonus star and a review would be shown. The player could also bribe the reviewer to complete the tasks instantly by spending 2 Toxin for

== Controversy ==
Zombie Cafe offered in-app purchases. The game was part of a lawsuit filed against Apple Inc. Children were using their parents' devices to play games and used the in-app purchase options, costing their parents money. Zombie Cafe was one of the games cited in the lawsuit. As a result of the lawsuit, Apple made in-app purchases only accessible through an Apple ID security check.

== Collaborations ==
In 2014, Capcom made collaborations with Zombie Café, having characters from the Mega Man, Ghosts 'n Goblins and Gaist Crusher series appear in the Japanese version of the game for a limited time.

== Critical reception ==
Zombie Café

Aggregate scores
Aggregator	Score
GameRankings	iOS: 50%
Metacritic	iOS: N/A

Review scores
Publication	Score
Gamezebo	3.5/5
Appolicious	9/10
HiTPhone	8/10
Slide to Play	5/10

Zombie Cafe had received positive reviews since its release. The game received 9.0 out of 10 in App Store customer ratings and Appolicious. HiTPhone gave it 8.0, Gamezebo's Jim Squires gave it a 7.0. Slide To Play and GameRankings gave it a lower score of 5.0 out of 10.
