= ICloud =

Cloud computing and storage service from Apple

iCloud

- The iCloud.com web interface
- Developer: Apple
- Type: Cloud service
- Launched: October 12, 2011; 15 years ago
- Status: Active
- Members: ~850 million, as of 2018
- Pricing model: 5 GB Free; optional subscription for more storage
- Website: icloud.com

iCloud is a personal cloud service run by Apple. Launched on October 12, 2011, iCloud enables users to store and sync data across devices, including Apple Mail, Apple Calendar, Apple Photos, Apple Notes, contacts, settings, backups, and files, to collaborate with other users, and track assets through Find My. iCloud's client app is built into iOS, iPadOS, watchOS, tvOS, macOS, and visionOS, and is available for Microsoft Windows. iCloud may additionally be accessed through a limited web interface.

iCloud offers users 5 GB of free storage which may be upgraded through optional paid plans to up to 12 TB; all paid plans include iCloud+ providing additional features. Optional end-to-end encryption has been available since 2022 for all iCloud data, except Calendar, Contacts, and Mail, which rely on legacy sync technologies for compatibility with third-party apps (CalDAV, CardDAV, IMAP). As of 2018, the service had an estimated 850 million users, up from 782 million users in 2016.

== History ==
iCloud was announced on May 31, 2011, in a press release. On June 6, 2011, during the WWDC 2011 keynote, Steve Jobs announced that iCloud would replace MobileMe, which had been widely seen as a "failure", a fact which Steve Jobs acknowledged during the announcement. iCloud was released on October 12, 2011, and MobileMe was discontinued on June 30, 2012. Previous MobileMe users could keep their @mac.com and @me.com email addresses as aliases to their new @icloud.com address. Earlier versions included Back to My Mac, which was previously part of MobileMe. This service allowed users to create point-to-point connections between computers. It was discontinued on July 1, 2019.

iCloud had 20 million users within a week after launch. It received early criticism for bugs, especially with Core Data syncing. These issues were addressed in iOS 7 and OS X Mavericks.

At launch, iCloud was partly hosted on Amazon Web Services and Microsoft Azure. In 2016, Apple replaced Azure with Google Cloud Platform. In 2021, The Information reported that Apple was storing 8 million TB of data on Google's cloud, and was on track to spend $300 million that year. Apple also operates its own data centers, including one in Maiden, North Carolina.

In June 2019, iCloud was introduced to Windows 10 via the Microsoft Store.

In June 2021, Apple introduced iCloud+, which added Private Relay, Hide My Email and Custom Email Domain to paid users of the services, as well as an unlimited storage limit for video from cameras added through HomeKit Secure Video.

In March 2022, Apple settled a class-action lawsuit alleging that it had misled users by storing data on non-Apple servers.

In February 2025, iCloud+ introduced a new app called Apple Invites.

== Features ==
iCloud is a free service, and comes with 5 GB of cloud storage. Users can subscribe to iCloud+ for additional storage up to 12 TB (or 14 TB for Apple One Premier plan users who receive an additional 2 TB of storage as part of the plan).

Some of iCloud's features are accessible not only through apps built into iOS, iPadOS, watchOS, tvOS and macOS but also on iCloud.com. These include:

- iCloud Mail, a free email address (@icloud.com) which supports Push email, a webmail interface, and IMAP sync to third-party clients;
- Contacts and calendar syncing, and calendar sharing features, as well as support for CardDAV and CalDAV;
- iCloud Drive, a cloud storage and syncing feature;
- iCloud Photos, which stores and syncs pictures in full-resolution;
- Pages, Keynote, and Numbers, allowing real-time collaboration on both native apps and the web;
- Notes and Reminders sync, and the ability to edit and create notes and reminders on the web;
- iCloud Invites, allowing the creation and management of digital invitations;
- Find My, which lets users find their Apple devices or other Find My-enabled devices, and remotely erase lost Apple devices;

iCloud is also built-in as a backend to many Apple apps and system features, where it can sync users' data and settings. This includes:

- Apple Books (books, highlights, bookmarks and annotations);
- Apple Home (settings and paired devices);
- Apple Music (with a feature called iCloud Music Library);
- Apple Wallet (passes and credit cards);
- Phone (call history);
- Safari (syncing bookmarks and history);
- Siri (settings, and past interactions with Siri and Dictation)

Third-party iOS and macOS app developers can implement iCloud functionality in their apps through the iCloud API.

=== Backup and restore ===
iCloud allows users to back up the settings and data on iOS devices running iOS 5 or later. Data backed up includes photos and videos in the Camera Roll, device settings, app data, messages (iMessage, SMS, MMS, and RCS), ringtones, and Visual Voicemails. Backups occur daily when the device is locked and connected to Wi-Fi and a power source. In case of a malfunction of any Apple device, during the restoration process, iCloud offers to restore all data along with App data only if the device was synced to iCloud and backed up.

=== Find My ===
Prior to iOS and iPadOS 13, Find my iPhone and Find My Friends stored data in iCloud before merging into Find My.

Find My enables users to track the location of iOS, iPadOS, macOS, watchOS devices, AirPods, AirTags and a number of supported third-party accessories through a connected iCloud account. A user can see the device's approximate location on a map (along with a circle depicting the margin of error), display a message and/or play a sound on the device (even if it is set to silent), and remotely erase its contents. Users can also share their GPS locations to others with Apple devices and view the location of others who choose to share their location.

The Send Last Location feature, which utilizes iCloud, can be optionally enabled to automatically send the location of the device to Apple when the battery is low.

=== iCloud Keychain ===
iCloud Keychain is a password manager developed by Apple that syncs passwords across devices and suggests secure ones when creating new accounts. It is integrated into Safari, and is accessible from other applications on iOS, iPadOS, macOS, and visionOS. It was announced at WWDC 2013, and released in October 2013 alongside iOS 7.0.3.

iCloud Keychain backups provide different security guarantees than traditional iCloud backups. This is because iCloud Keychain uses "end-to-end encryption", meaning that iCloud Keychain backups are designed so that the provider does not have access to unencrypted data. This is accomplished through the use of a novel "key vault" design based on a Hardware Security Module located in Apple's data centers.

In iOS 18 and iPadOS 18, iCloud Keychain was migrated from a page in the settings app to a standalone app, Passwords. The Passwords app continues to sync with iCloud Keychain and the Keychain application.

=== iTunes Match ===
iTunes Match debuted on November 14, 2011. It was initially available to US users only. For an annual fee, customers can scan and match tracks in their iTunes music library, including tracks copied from CDs or other sources, with tracks in the iTunes Store, so customers do not have to repurchase said tracks. Customers may download up to 100,000 tracks in 256 kbit/s DRM-free AAC file format that matches tracks in any supported audio file formats in customers' iTunes libraries, including ALAC and MP3. Customers also have the choice to keep their original copies stored on their computers or have them replaced by copies from the iTunes Store. Any music not available in the iTunes Store is uploaded for download onto customers' other supported devices and computers; doing this will not take storage from the customers' iCloud's storage allowance. Any such tracks stored in the higher quality lossless audio ALAC, or original uncompressed PCM formats, WAV and AIFF, are transcoded to 256 kbit/s DRM-free AAC format before uploading to the customers' iCloud storage account, leaving the original higher quality local files in their original format.

If a user stops paying for the iTunes Match service, all copies of the DRM-free AAC iTunes Store versions of tracks that have already been downloaded onto any device can be kept, whether on iOS devices or computers.

From iOS 7 and OS X Mavericks, the iTunes Radio function will be available across devices, including integration with the Music app, both on portable iOS devices and Apple TV (2nd generation onwards), as well as inside the iTunes app on Macintosh and Windows computers. It will be included in an ad-free version for subscribers to the iTunes Match service and is currently available only in the US and Australia.

The streaming Genius shuffle is not available in current versions of iOS but is available in iTunes on the Mac.

On January 28, 2016, ad-free iTunes Radio was discontinued and is therefore no longer part of iTunes Match.

As of March 26, 2014, iTunes Match is available in 116 countries, while iTunes in the Cloud is available in 155 countries.

=== iWork for iCloud ===
During the 2013 Apple Worldwide Developers Conference (WWDC) keynote speech, iWork for iCloud was announced for release at the same time as the next version of the app versions of iWork later in the year. The three apps for both iOS and macOS that form Apple's iWork suite (Pages, Numbers, and Keynote), will be made available on a web interface (named as Pages for iCloud, Numbers for iCloud, and Keynote for iCloud respectively), and accessed via the iCloud website under each user's iCloud Apple ID login. They will also sync with the user's iOS and macOS versions of the app, should they have them, again via their iCloud Apple ID.

This allows the user to edit and create documents on the web, using one of the supported browsers: Safari, Chrome, and Microsoft Edge. It also means that Microsoft Windows users now have access to these native –previously only Apple device– document editing tools, via the web interface.

=== Photo Stream ===
Photo Stream was a service supplied with the basic iCloud service which allows users to store the most recent 1,000 photos on the iCloud servers for up to 30 days free of charge. When a photo is taken on a device with Photo Stream enabled, it automatically uploaded to iCloud servers. From there, it become available for viewing and saving on the rest of the user's Photo Stream-enabled devices. The photo was automatically removed from the server after 30 days or when it becomes photo number 1,001 in the user's stream. Photo Stream installed on a Mac or Windows desktop computer includes an option to have all photos permanently saved on that device. The service also integrated with Apple TV, allowing users to view their recent photos wirelessly on their HDTV. In May 2023, Apple announced the discontinuation of Photo Stream, with uploads turned off on June 26, and the service turned off on July 26.

=== iCloud Photos ===
iCloud Photos is a feature on iOS 8.1 or later and OS X Yosemite (version 10.10) or later, plus web app access. The service stores all of the user's photos, maintaining their original resolution and metadata. Users can access their iCloud Photos on supported devices via the new Photos app when available or via the iCloud Photos web app at iCloud.com, which helps limit the amount of local storage each device needs to use to store photos (particularly those with smaller storage capacities) by storing lower-resolution versions on the device, with the user having the option to keep some/all stored locally at a higher resolution.

=== Storage ===
Since its introduction in 2011, each account has 5 GB of free storage for owners of either an iOS device using iOS 5.x or later, or a Mac using OS X Lion 10.7 or later. Users can pay monthly for additional storage for a total of 50 GB, 200 GB or 2 TB. Starting in September 2023, storage options for 6 TB and 12 TB have been added. The amount of storage is shared across all devices per iCloud Apple ID.

Several native features of iCloud use each user's iCloud storage allowance, specifically, Backup and restore, and email, Contacts, and Calendars. On Macs, users can also store most filetypes into iCloud folders of their choosing, rather than only storing them locally on the machine. While Photo Stream uses the iCloud servers, usage does not come out of the user's iCloud storage allowance. This is also true for iTunes Match music content, even for music that is not sold in the iTunes Store and which gets uploaded into iCloud storage, it does not count against the user's allowance. Other apps can optionally integrate app storage out of the user's iCloud storage allowance.

Not all of a user's content counts as part of their iCloud storage allowance. Apple can keep a permanent track of every purchase a user makes under their Apple ID account, and by associating each piece of content with the user, it means only one copy of every Store item is needed to be kept on Apple's servers. For items bought from the iTunes Store (music, music videos, movies, TV shows), Apple Books Store (books), or App Store (iOS apps), this uses a service Apple called iTunes in the Cloud, allowing the user to automatically, or manually if preferred, re-download any of their previous purchases on to a Mac, PC, or iOS device. Downloaded (or streamed, provided the user is connected to the Internet) iTunes Store content can be used across all these devices, however, while Apple Books Store and App Store content can be downloaded to Macs and PCs for syncing to iOS devices, only iOS and Mac devices (and their respective apps) can be used to read the books. Similarly, macOS apps purchased from the Mac App Store are also linked to the Apple ID they were purchased through and can be downloaded to any Mac using the same Apple ID. Also, when a user registers any new device, all previously bought Store content can be downloaded from the Store servers or non-Store content from the iCloud servers.

Audiobooks and their metadata fields from non-Apple purchased sources are not synced across devices (macOS or iOS) inside the Apple Books apps, and nor does the metadata from non-Apple purchased books (in Ebook or PDF format). There remains a syncing mismatch on some types of media, between Apple-purchased content and non-Apple purchased content that remains in effect for iCloud users.

=== iCloud Drive ===
iCloud Drive is iCloud's file hosting service, that syncs files across devices running iOS 8, OS X Yosemite (version 10.10), or Windows 7 or later, plus online web app access via iCloud.com. Users can store any kind of file (including photos, videos, documents, music, and other apps' data) in iCloud Drive and access it on any Mac, iPad, iPhone, iPod Touch, or Windows PC, with any single file being a maximum of 50 GB in file size (earlier it was 15 GB). This allows users to start their work on one device and continue on another device. By default, users still get 5 GB of storage for free as previously, but the expandable storage plans available have increased in size (current tiers: 50 GB, 200 GB, and 2 TB), and altered to monthly subscription payment options from the yearly ones offered under the previous MobileMe service.

In iOS 11, iCloud Drive has been integrated into the new Files app that gives users access to all their cloud and local on-device storage, which replaced the standalone iCloud Drive app.

According to computer scientist Malcolm Hall, certain file types are automatically excluded from iCloud Drive and will not be uploaded. These exclusions include Aperture and Photos libraries. Users can also manually exclude files or folders by appending .nosync to the end of their filenames.

=== Messages on iCloud ===
Messages on iCloud is a feature on iOS 11.4 and macOS High Sierra 10.13.5 which keeps all of a user's iMessages and SMS texts stored in the cloud.

=== Private Relay ===
==== Architecture ====
iCloud Private Relay enhances user privacy for Safari browsing by using a multi-hop architecture to separate a user's identity from their web traffic, ensuring that no single party, including Apple, can see both who the user is and what they are browsing. The process involves two separate internet relays:

1. Ingress Relay (Apple): When a user navigates to a website, their request is encrypted on the device. The traffic is first sent to a relay operated by Apple. This relay can see the user's IP address but not the name of the website they are trying to visit, as the DNS query is encrypted.
2. Egress Relay (Third-Party): From Apple's relay, the request is passed to a second relay operated by a third-party content delivery network, such as Cloudflare or Fastly. This egress relay can see the destination website but not the user's original IP address. It assigns a temporary IP address before sending the request to the website.

This dual-relay design is an implementation of a privacy-preserving protocol called MASQUE, which is standardized by the Internet Engineering Task Force. The protocol is designed to decouple requests from their source, thus protecting the user's identity from the destination server and the content of the request from the network intermediaries. iCloud Private Relay also uses Oblivious DNS over HTTPS to help protect user privacy.

==== Availability ====
According to Apple, "regulatory reasons" prevent the company from launching Private Relay in China, Belarus, Russia, Colombia, Egypt, Kazakhstan, Saudi Arabia, South Africa, Turkmenistan, Uganda, and the Philippines.

=== Hide My Email ===
Hide My Email is available to iCloud+ users and allows users in Mail and Safari to generate random anonymous Apple email addresses (@icloud.com) which forward messages to their main email address. These addresses can be used for receiving emails indefinitely, and can be temporarily deactivated or permanently deleted at any time.

=== Custom Email Domain ===
Custom Email Domain, an iCloud+ feature, allows users to personalize their email address with a custom domain name and invite family members to use the same domain with their iCloud Mail accounts.

=== Apple Invites ===
Apple Invites allows iCloud+ users to create and share event invitations. Users can add date, location, title and a description. Additionally Apple Music subscribers can add a playlist and a shared iCloud Photo album. Invites can be viewed on all devices using icloud.com.

=== Bundled services in select countries ===
In September 2026, Apple began bundling the Apple TV streaming service, Apple Arcade, and a limited version of Apple Music with all paid iCloud+ subscriptions in more than 100 countries, primarily smaller territories or those deemed to have greater price sensitivity such as India. The Apple One bundle will also be wound down in all applicable countries where it was previously available.

== Security and privacy ==
In 2013, as part of the Snowden revelations, The Washington Post and The Guardian reported on leaked NSA documents which showed that iCloud was part of the NSA's PRISM surveillance program, along with other cloud services. According to the documents, the NSA could access emails, chats, photos and videos, and stored files. The documents specifically stated that the data was collected through "equipment installed at company-controlled locations". The Washington Post further stated that Apple, like the other companies, was aware of the program and was a willing participant. Apple denied having ever heard of the program.

In 2014, some celebrities' nude photos were leaked; these photos had been synced to iCloud by the celebrities' iPhones. Apple denied that the hack was caused by a security flaw in iCloud, and said that the leaks were the result of phishing, a targeted attack in which the celebrities were tricked by hackers into revealing their account passwords.

=== End-to-end encryption ===
Some iCloud data is end-to-end encrypted by default. As of January 2022, these include: Apple Card transactions, Health data, Home data, iCloud Keychain, Apple Maps favorites, collections, and search history, Memoji, Messages in iCloud, vocabulary learned by the QuickType keyboard, Safari web-browser history, tab groups, and iCloud tabs, Screen Time, Siri information, Wi-Fi passwords, and W1 and H1 Bluetooth keys. However, if iCloud Backup is enabled, the encryption key for Messages in iCloud is part of the backup, allowing Apple to access users' entire iMessage history if served with a search warrant.

==== Advanced Data Protection ====
On December 7, 2022, Apple announced Advanced Data Protection for iCloud, an option to enable end-to-end encryption for almost all iCloud data including Backups, Notes, Photos, and more. The only data classes that are ineligible for Advanced Data Protection are Mail, Contacts, and Calendars, in order to preserve the ability to sync third-party clients with IMAP, CardDAV or CalDAV.

The feature became available to US customers on December 13 with the release of iOS/iPadOS 16.2 and macOS 13.1, and was expanded to the rest of the world on January 23, 2023, with iOS/iPadOS 16.3 and macOS 13.2. Users must upgrade to these versions to be able to enable the feature.

Apple prevents users from enabling Advanced Data Protection from a device that was recently added to their iCloud account, in order to prevent hackers from locking users out of their files by enabling encryption.

=== Child sexual abuse material ===
Apple started scanning images sent via iCloud Mail for child pornography in 2019. On August 5, 2021, Apple confirmed it had planned to start scanning iCloud Photos for the same reason. However, after receiving a public backlash against scanning unencrypted unuploaded photos, Apple backed down from its plans to scan iCloud Photos, and canceled them altogether in December 2022.

=== China ===
In February 2018, Apple announced that iCloud users in China would have their data, including encryption data, on servers called "Guizhou Cloud Big Data (GCBD)" (in Chinese "云上贵州") located in the country to comply with local regulations. This raised concerns from human rights activists who claim that it may be used to track dissidents. French nonprofit Reporters Without Borders — otherwise known as Reporters Sans Frontières or RSF — is telling journalists who have iCloud accounts in China should either move or close their accounts. In response, CEO Tim Cook stated that Apple encryption was "the same in every country in the world," including China.

On June 7, 2021, during the WWDC event, Apple announced that iCloud's new 'private relay' feature would not work in China for regulatory reasons.

=== United Kingdom ===
On February 7, 2025, US media reports revealed that Apple had received a "technical capability notice" under the UK's Investigatory Powers Act 2016, ordering them to break the encryption on iCloud backups using Advanced Data Protection worldwide. The public disclosure of such orders is illegal.

Two weeks later, on February 21, 2025, an Apple spokesperson told several news outlets that Advanced Data Protection would no longer be available to new users in the UK and that existing UK users would need to disable this feature. It transpired that in 2025 Home Secretary Yvette Cooper ordered Apple to build the backdoor for global content and global users, "but under pressure from the Trump administration, [she] dropped the order, later writing a second one that applied only to people in Britain."

In early March 2025, Apple reportedly made an appeal to the Investigatory Powers Tribunal.

On September 17, 2026, Apple sought to lift the restrictions on publicity as part of a wider appeal against the order. Daniel Beard KC told the tribunal at a case management hearing that this would allow “facts to be deployed in the open” and “advance the challenge in a meaningful way”. Shabana Mahmood, the Home Secretary, protested through her barrister that "the surveillance laws were designed to prevent terrorist attacks and combat child sex abuse." Ailsa Carmichael, Lady Carmichael and her two other colleagues, demurred.

On November 19, 2026, U.K.’s Investigatory Powers Tribunal ruled that the government must confirm the existence of the technical capability notice.

== See also ==
- Comparison of file hosting services
- Comparison of online backup services
- Comparison of online music lockers
- Remote backup service
- File hosting service
