= Apple Invites =

Virtual event management app

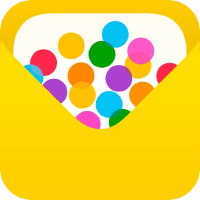
- Developer: Apple
- Release: February 4, 2025; 20 months ago
- Operating system: iOS 18 or later
- Platform: iPhone; Web-based access via iCloud.com
- Type: Event management
- Website: icloud.com/invites

Apple Invites is a social planning and event management application developed by Apple for devices running iOS 18 or higher devices and web browsers through iCloud.com, launched on February 4, 2025. The app enables iCloud+ subscribers to create and send customizable digital invitations and manage RSVPs, as well as collaborate on shared photo albums and music playlists.

The service differs from Apple's previous Cards app, which allowed users to create and design greeting cards from a list of templates and have them physically printed and mailed. Cards was discontinued by Apple in 2013.

== Features ==
Users can create virtual invitations for upcoming events, adding a date and time, description, and location, with integrations for Apple Maps directions and weather forecasts. A background image can be chosen from the photo library or from a selection of existing images. An active iCloud+ subscription is required to for hosts to create an event, which can be sent out to guests via Messages, Mail, or a direct link. Hosts are able to send "notes" to communicate updates leading into the event, which will be pushed out as a notification to all guests.

Event participants can RSVP to an invitation, even if they do not have an Apple Account. The host can also choose to create a shared photo album or collaborative playlist (if also an Apple Music subscriber) which guests can contribute to ahead of the event. Users can view all past or upcoming events they have hosted or been invited to within the app.

Invites makes use of Apple Intelligence features such as Image Playground for generating backgrounds or writing tools for text refinement.

== Development ==
Code referencing the app, under the internal codename "Confetti", was first uncovered in a beta release of iOS 18.3 while in internal testing by journalist Mark Gurman on February 2, 2025. It was officially announced on February 4, 2025, and was made available through the App Store on the same day.

== Reception ==
Early reviews highlighted its integration with Apple's ecosystem and ease of use, though analysts noted competition with established platforms like Partiful and Paperless Post.
