= Chris Hulls =

American entrepreneur and business executive

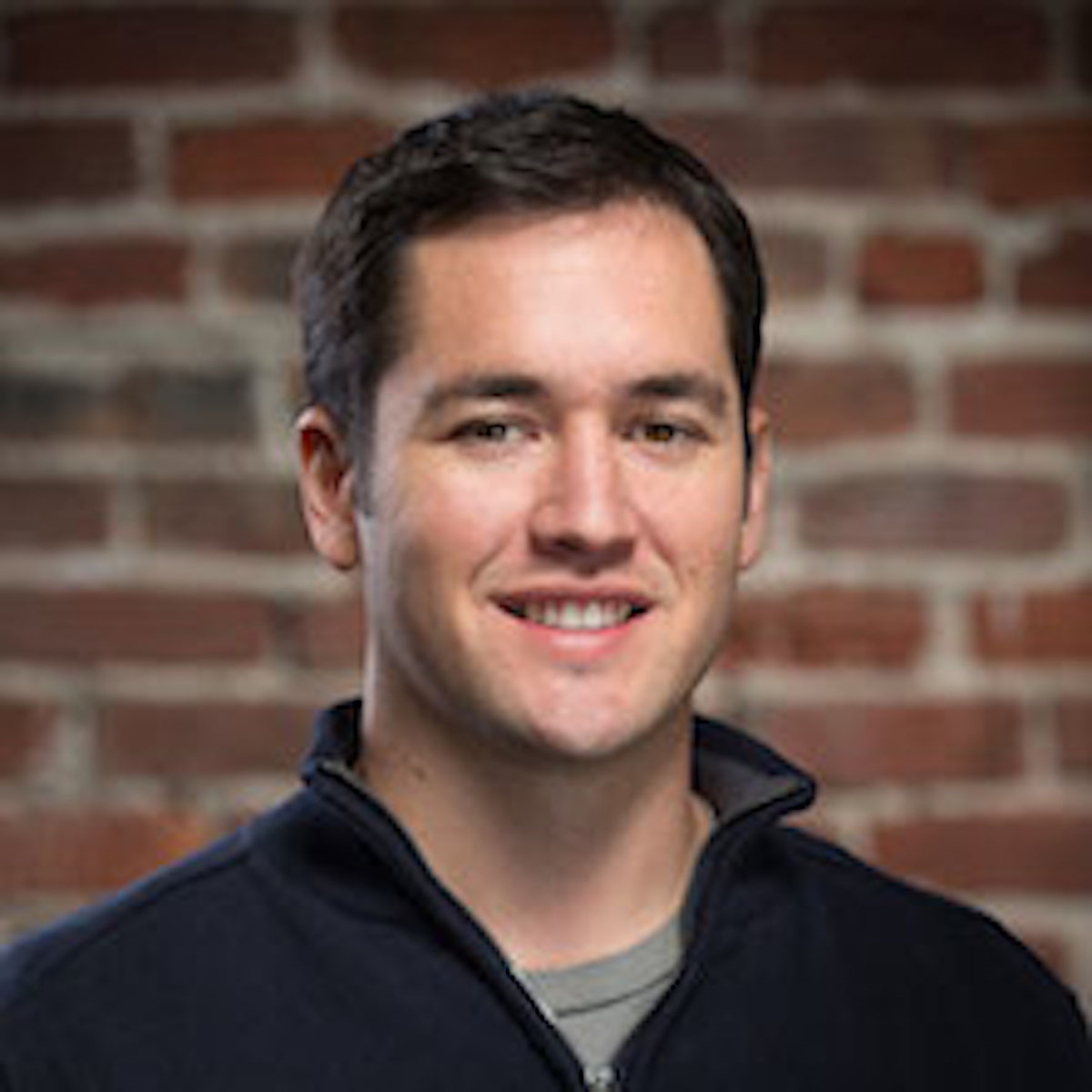
- Education: Bachelor of Science in Business Administration
- Alma mater: University of California, Berkeley
- Occupations: Business Executive, Entrepreneur
- Known for: Founder and CEO, Life360

Chris Hulls is an American entrepreneur and business executive, best known for being the founder of the family networking app Life360.

== Early life and education ==
Chris Hulls attended Tomales High School in Tomales, California, where he graduated a year early, subsequently taking classes at the College of Marin.

He joined the United States Air Force and served out of Qatar. After leaving the military, he enrolled at the University of California, Berkeley, serving an internship with Goldman Sachs. After turning down an offer to work full-time, he enrolled in Harvard Business School.

He is the brother of Pulitzer Prize winner Tessa Hulls.

== Career ==
Hulls left Harvard to launch Life360, a mobile family networking application that allows families to see each other's locations through password-protected networks.

He came up with the idea during his time as an undergraduate. After seeing the United States Government's Ready.gov initiative that allowed people to find family members in a disaster, Hulls decided to create an easier platform for mobile users. Ready.gov used a system of pre-printed forms that families could print and fill out with a pen, while Hulls decided to make the app a location-based service that worked in real time. Hulls entered the Life360 app into the Android Developer Challenge and won the competition over 3,000 other entries. He received a $275,000 award, that he used to pay back prior investments from friends and family as well as hire developers for the app.

As of July 2026, Hulls is executive chairman and CEO of Life360, Inc. The company is listed on the Australian Stock Exchange, and he is Australia's highest-paid executive, reported as earning close to A$48 million in the 2025 Australian financial year. This amount is nearly 500 times the average full-time salary in Australia.

== Other activities ==
Outside of Life360, Hulls has been involved in public speaking and been quoted in numerous publications on various topics.

In 2026, Hulls funded a non-profit named the Good Luck Fund. He purchased several Bay Area properties including the historic Old Western Saloon, the former Station House Cafe, Vladimir's Czech Restaurant, and vineyards, with the vision of revitalizing them and allowing local residents to purchase shares in the properties.
