= Mike Farley =

Mike Farley may refer to:

- Mike Farley (coach) (1934–2018), American football and baseball coach, and baseball player
- Mike Farley (actor) (born 1967), British writer, performer and voice artist

== See also ==
- Michael F. Farley (1863–1921), American businessman and politician
