= AirTag =

Apple tracking device for finding lost items

- An Apple AirTag
- Developer: Apple
- Manufacturer: Foxconn
- Type: Key finder
- Released: April 30, 2021; 5 years ago (1st generation); January 26, 2026; 9 months ago (2nd generation)
- Introductory price: 29 USD; 99 USD (4-pack)
- Discontinued: January 26, 2026; 9 months ago (1st generation)
- Connectivity: Bluetooth LE, UWB, NFC
- Power: CR2032 button cell
- Current firmware: 2.0.73 (2A73) (1st generation); 3.0.41 (2nd generation)
- Online services: Find My network
- Dimensions: Diameter: 31.9 mm (1.26 in); Thickness: 8 mm (0.31 in)
- Weight: 11 g (0.39 oz) (1st generation); 11.8 g (0.42 oz) (2nd generation)
- Website: apple.com/airtag

AirTag is a tracking device developed by Apple. AirTag is designed to act as a key finder, which helps people find personal objects such as keys, bags, apparel, small electronic devices and vehicles. To locate lost or stolen items, AirTags use Apple's crowdsourced Find My network, estimated in early 2021 to consist of approximately one billion devices worldwide that detect and anonymously report emitted Bluetooth signals.

AirTags are compatible with any iPhone, iPad, or iPod Touch device capable of running iOS/iPadOS 14.5 or later, including iPhone 6S or later (including iPhone SE 1, 2 and 3). Using the built-in U1 chip on iPhone 11 or later (except iPhone SE models, iPhone 16e and iPhone 17e models), users can more precisely locate items using ultra-wideband (UWB) technology. AirTag has been available since 2021.

An updated model with the U2 chip, upgraded Bluetooth, and a louder speaker was released in January 2026. It has enhanced range for precision detection with iPhones and Apple Watches equipped with a U2 chip such as the iPhone 15/15 Pro or later (excluding iPhone 16e and 17e), and the Apple Watch Series 9/Ultra 2 or later (excluding SE 3), to precisely locate items. The second generation AirTag is compatible with devices running iOS/iPadOS/watchOS 26.2.1 or later.

== History ==
The product was rumored to be under development in April 2019. In February 2020, it was reported that Asahi Kasei was prepared to supply Apple with tens of millions of ultra-wideband (UWB) parts for the rumored AirTag in the second and third quarters of 2020, though the shipment was ultimately delayed. On April 2, 2020, a YouTube video on Apple Support page also confirmed AirTag. In Apple's iOS 14.0 release, code was discovered that described the reusable and removable battery that would be used in the AirTag. In March 2021, Macworld stated that iOS 14.5 beta's Find My user interface included "Items" and "Accessories" features meant for AirTag support for a user's "backpack, luggage, headphones" and other objects. AppleInsider noted that the beta included safety warnings for "unauthorized AirTags" persistently in a user's vicinity.

== Features ==
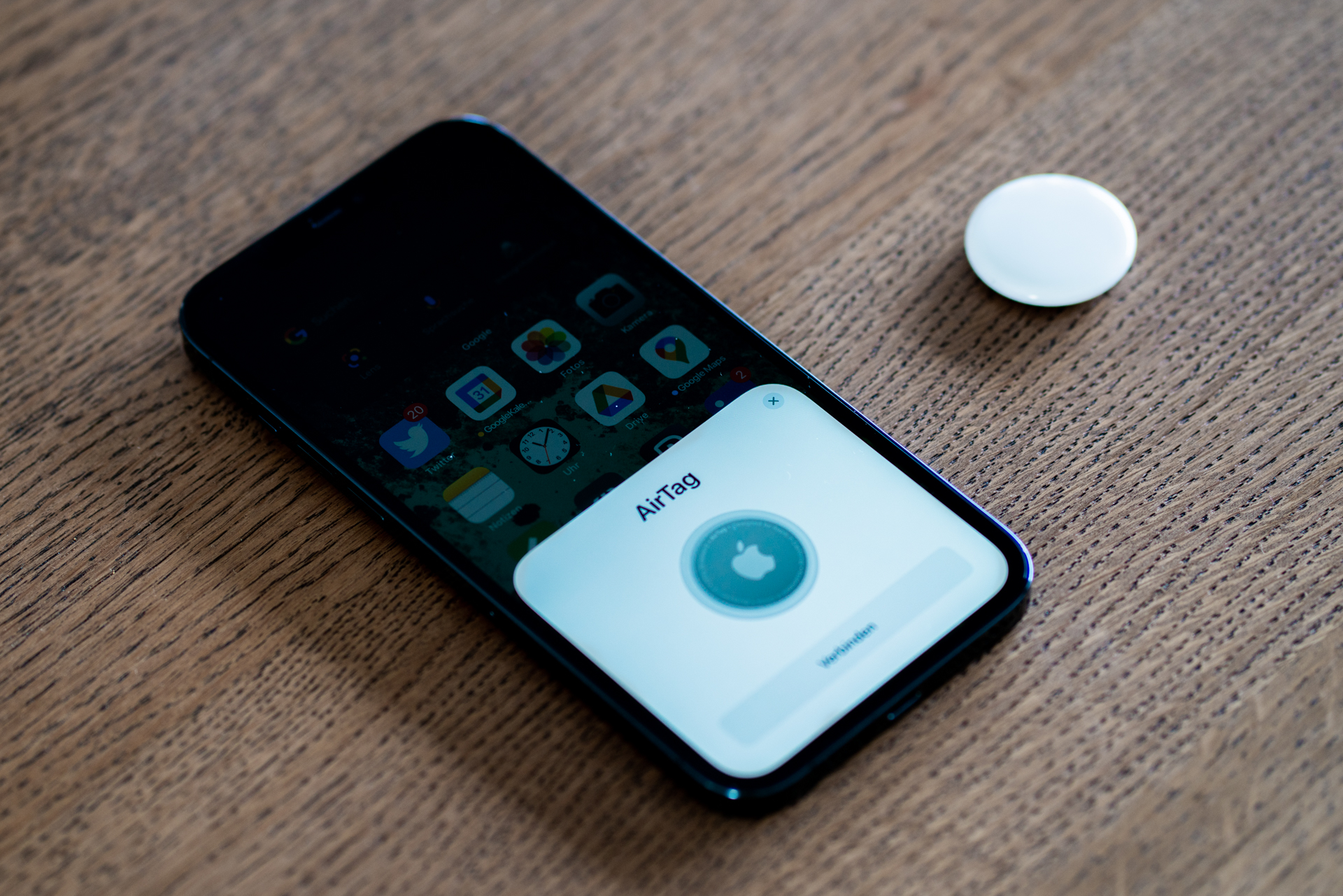
AirTag setup on iOS

AirTags can be interacted with using the Find My app. Users may trigger the AirTag to play a sound from the app. iPhones equipped with the U1 or U2 chip can use "Precision Tracking" to provide direction to and precise distance from an AirTag. Precision Tracking utilizes ultra-wideband.

AirTags are not satellite navigation devices. AirTags are located on a map within the Find My app by utilizing Bluetooth signals from other anonymous iOS and iPadOS devices out in the world. To help prevent unwanted tracking, an iOS/iPadOS device will alert their owner if someone else's AirTag seems to be with them, instead of with the AirTag's owner, for too long. If an AirTag is out of range of any Apple device for a random duration between 8 and 24 hours, it will begin to beep to alert a person that an AirTag may have been placed in their possession.

Users can mark an AirTag as lost and provide a phone number and a message. Any iPhone user can see this phone number and message with the "Identify Found Item" feature within the Find My app, which utilizes near-field communication (NFC) technology. Additionally, devices with NFC capabilities can identify an AirTag with a tap, which will redirect to a website containing the message and phone number.

AirTag requires an Apple Account and iOS or iPadOS 14.5 or later. It uses the CR2032 button cell battery, replaceable with one year of battery life (though some batteries with child-resistant bitterants cannot be used due to the design of the AirTag battery terminal). The maximum range of Bluetooth tracking is estimated to be around 30 meters. The water-resistance of an AirTag is rated IP67 water and dust; an AirTag can withstand 30 minutes of water immersion in standard laboratory conditions. Each Apple Account is limited to 32 AirTags.

== Firmware version history ==
Apple does not provide a way for users to force an AirTag to carry out a firmware update. Firmware updates may happen automatically whenever an AirTag is in Bluetooth range of the paired iPhone (running iOS 14.5 or later) and both devices have sufficient battery.

Legend:
Unsupported
Latest version

Version	Build	Release date	Release notes
1.0.225		April 30, 2021	Initial version at launch
1.0.276	1A276d	June 3, 2021	Modifies the time period before an AirTag will play a sound after being separated from its owner. Originally three days, the update shortens the period to a randomized window ranging from eight to 24 hours.
1.0.276	1A287a	June 12, 2021	Modifies the time period before an AirTag will play a sound after being separated from its owner. Originally three days, the update shortens the period to a randomized window ranging from eight to 24 hours.
1.0.276	1A287b	June 22, 2021	Modifies the time period before an AirTag will play a sound after being separated from its owner. Originally three days, the update shortens the period to a randomized window ranging from eight to 24 hours.
1.0.291	1A291a	August 26, 2021	Unknown
1.0.291	1A291c	August 31, 2021	Unknown
1.0.291	1A291e	September 7, 2021	Unknown
1.0.291	1A291f	September 14, 2021	Unknown
1.0.301	1A301	April 26, 2022	Tuning the unwanted tracking sound to more easily locate an unknown AirTag.
2.0.24	2A24e	November 10, 2022 (Note: Apple pulled the update before full deployment.)	Enables Precision Finding to help locate an unknown AirTag detected moving with a person.; If the iPhone is awake, a notification alerts the user when an AirTag that's separated from its owner is traveling with the user and emitting a sound to indicate it has been moved.
2.0.36	2A36	December 12, 2022	Resolves an issue with the accelerometer not activating in certain scenarios.
2.0.61	2A61	October 31, 2023	Bug fixes and other improvements.
2.0.73	2A73	March 19, 2024	No declared release notes.

== Applications ==
=== Tracking checked luggage ===
AirTags have become extremely popular among travelers to track checked luggage on flights and empower them when luggage is lost by carriers. In response, Lufthansa stated that AirTags were not permissible in luggage checked with the carrier. The carrier backtracked after a risk assessment by German risk authorities following widespread criticism and accusations that it was seeking to avoid accountability. The Federal Aviation Administration has ruled that storing AirTags in checked luggage is permitted and not a safety hazard as they contain less than 100 mg of lithium.

=== Theft prevention and recovery ===
AirTags have been used to track stolen property and assist police in recovering them for return to their rightful owners. In February 2023, a North Carolina family discovered that their car had been stolen. In coordination with local police, they utilized an AirTag placed in the vehicle to locate the car and were able to recover their property.

== Criticism ==
=== Use by stalkers ===
Despite Apple's inclusion of technologies to help prevent unwanted tracking or stalking, The Washington Post found that it was "frighteningly easy" to bypass the systems put in place. It has been described as "a gift to stalkers". Concerns included the built-in audible alarm taking three days to sound (since reduced to 8–24 hours), and the fact that most Americans had Android devices that would not receive alerts about nearby AirTags that iPhone devices receive. AirTags cannot have most of their components replaced correctly, but it has been found that AirTags with their speakers forcibly removed from the rest of the components were being used to track people. The AirTag cannot detect this change, making it harder for people to find out that an AirTag has been stalking them. AirTags with their speakers removed have been found for sale on sites such as eBay and Etsy. In January 2022, BBC News spoke to six women who stated that they had found unregistered AirTags inside belongings such as cars and bags.

In late 2021, Apple released an app called Tracker Detect on the Google Play Store to help users of Android 9 or later to discover unknown AirTags near them in a "lost" state and potentially being used for malicious tracking purposes. The app does not run in the background.

In February 2022, Apple added a warning for users setting up their AirTag, notifying them that using the device to track people is illegal and the device is only meant for tracking personal belongings. The AirTag chirps within 8 to 24 hours if it has been separated from the device it is paired with.

=== Tracking cars ===
The National Post in Canada reported that AirTags were placed on vehicles at shopping malls and parking lots without the drivers' knowledge, in order to track them to their homes, where the vehicles would be stolen. In response, Apple announced just before WWDC 2021 that it had begun rolling out updates that would allow anyone with an NFC-capable phone to tap an unwanted AirTag for instructions on how to disable it, and that they had decreased the delay time for the audible alert that sounds after the AirTag is separated from its owner from three days to a random time between 8 and 24 hours.

=== Susceptibility to hacking ===
Users who set their AirTags to lost mode are prompted to provide a contact phone number for finders to call. In September 2021, security researcher Brian Krebs, citing fellow security researcher Bobby Rauch, reported that the phone number field will actually accept any type of input, including arbitrary computer code, opening up the potential use of AirTags as trojan horse devices.

=== Similarity to Tile ===
Similar product manufacturer Tile criticized Apple for using similar technologies and designs to Tile's trackers. Spokespeople for Tile made a testimony to the United States Congress saying that Apple was supporting "anti-competitive practices", claiming that Apple had done this in the past, and that they think it is "entirely appropriate for Congress to take a closer look at Apple's business practices".

=== Difficulty attaching ===
AirTags do not have holes or other mechanical features that would allow them to be positively attached or affixed to the item being tracked; solutions include adhesives (glue, tape) and purpose-built accessories. The polyurethane AirTag Loop is the least expensive solution sold by Apple; it costs the same as a single AirTag and has been criticized as an "accessory tax".

== Alternatives ==
Other similar trackers claiming compatibility with Apple's "Find My AirTag" are available. While only compatible with Apple devices, they do not use Apple's proprietary Ultra Wideband (UWB) technology. However, consumer magazine Which? reported about AirTags "it's unlikely to be much help if you've lost it somewhere really rural. We've found that the Find My network ... has the widest coverage, but it's still reliant on someone with an iOS device walking past your tracker."

AirTags and equivalents using Apple's "Find My" are not supported by the Android operating system; while they can scan a nearby AirTag using Near Field Communication (NFC) and detect unknown AirTags, they cannot pair with a device or use advanced tracking. There are trackers for Android, including Tile, Samsung Galaxy SmartTag, and Chipolo One. Various trackers use other networks, including Google's Find My Device and proprietary networks. Accuracy in finding and locating distant objects is mostly reported as of 2025 to be relatively poor, while trackers using Apple's network are accurate.

== See also ==
- iBeacon
- List of UWB-enabled devices
- Galaxy SmartTag
- Xiaomi Tag
- Wheels of Zeus
