= Fast Pair =

Proprietary standard for pairing Bluetooth devices

Fast Pair Service
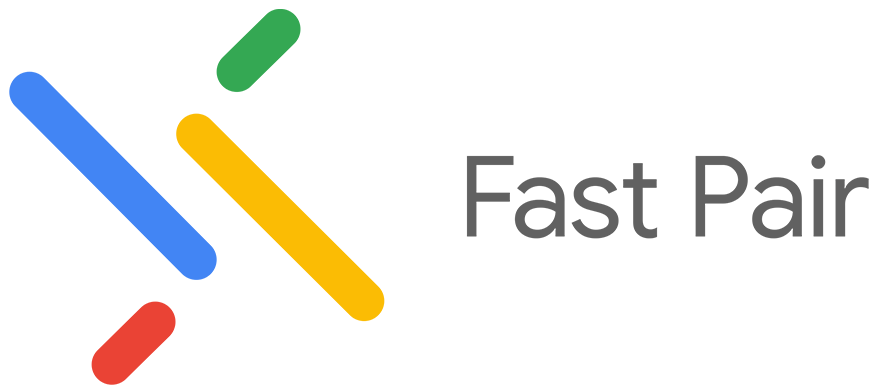

- An example of a Fast Pair connection prompt, triggered from a compliant device
- Other names: GFPS, Fast Pair
- Developer: Google
- Release: October 31, 2017; 9 years ago
- Operating system: Android, Android TV, ChromeOS, WearOS
- Website: developers.google.com/nearby/fast-pair

The Google Fast Pair Service, or simply Fast Pair, is Google's proprietary standard for quickly pairing Bluetooth devices when they come in close proximity for the first time using Bluetooth Low Energy (BLE).

== History ==
It was announced in October 2017 and initially designed for connecting audio devices such as speakers, headphones and car kits with the Android operating system. In 2018, Google added support for ChromeOS devices, and in 2019, Google announced that Fast Pair connections could now be synced with other Android devices on the same Google Account, a feature which Google expanded to ChromeOS devices in December 2023.

Google has partnered with Bluetooth system on a chip (SoC) designers including Qualcomm, Airoha Technology, and BES Technic to add Fast Pair support to their SDKs. In May 2019, Qualcomm announced their Smart Headset Reference Design, Qualcomm QCC5100, QCC3024 and QCC3034 SoC series with support for Fast Pair and Google Assistant. In July 2019, Google announced True Wireless Features (TWF), Find My Device (later Find Hub) and enhanced Connected Device Details.

== Validator ==
Fast Pair Validator
- Developer: Google
- Release: November 14, 2018; 7 years ago
- Stable release: 3.0 (Build 1003949297) / October 21, 2026; 16 days ago
- Operating system: Android 7+

In November 2018, Google released a mobile app for manufacturers of Bluetooth devices wanting to validate their implementation of Fast Pair. When connected to a Google Cloud Platform project, the app is capable of calibrating transmission power and verifying Bluetooth Low Energy (BLE) payloads and device discoberability and pairing. As of 2026, in order to transition the project from its "provisional" state to active, the manufacturer must submit an application directly to Google.
