= Tessa Hulls =

American graphic memoirist (born 1984)

- Born: 1984 (age 41–42); Northern California, United States
- Occupation: Graphic memoirist
- Relatives: Chris Hulls (brother)
- Writing career
- Notable work: Feeding Ghosts (2024)
- Notable awards: Pulitzer Prize for Memoir or Autobiography
- Website: Official website

Tessa Hulls (born 1984) is an American non-fiction writer and graphic memoirist. She is notable for her graphic memoir, Feeding Ghosts, which won the Pulitzer Prize for Memoir or Autobiography as well as other awards.

== Life and work ==
Hulls was born in 1984 in a small town near the coast of Northern California. Her father was a British immigrant and her mother was of Chinese origin. Her brother is Chris Hulls.

Hull’s book Feeding Ghosts follows, in words and picture panels, three generations of Hull’s family. Sun Yi, Hull’s maternal grandmother, was a journalist in Shanghai, China, in the era of Mao Zedong. After years of harassment by the Communist Party, Sun Yi fled to Hong Kong in 1957 with her daughter Rose. There she published a memoir in Mandarin about her experience, had a mental breakdown, and spent the rest of her life in and out of mental hospitals. Sun Yi’s daughter Rose, Hull’s mother, had an unhappy time in a colonial boarding school before emigrating to Minnesota, USA, in 1970. Later on, Rose brought her mother Sun Yi to live with her in the USA. Not enjoying the intense co-dependency of her mother and grandmother, Hulls left home and travelled extensively.

Feeding Ghosts took ten years to research and to write, time which included learning some Chinese and getting her grandmother’s memoir translated into English. In Feeding Ghosts, Hull pieces together one hundred years of family history and three generations of trauma.

Hulls is also a long-distance solo cyclist and explorer of the outdoors, and has presented illustrated lectures entitled 'She Traveled Solo: Strong Women of the Early 20th Century'. The lectures were about female explorers and adventurers, like Bessie Coleman, Fannie Quigley, Ada Blackjack, Annie Londonderry, Fanny Bullock Workman, and Katie Sandwina. Hulls has published in The Washington Post, Atlas Obscura, and Adventure Journal. Her comics have appeared in The Rumpus, City Arts, and SPARK.

== Awards and recognition ==
Hulls received grants from the Seattle Office of Arts and Culture and 4Culture, and received the Artist Trust Arts Innovator Award. In 2025, she received the Pulitzer Prize for Memoir or Autobiography, the John Leonard Prize for Best First Book, the Anisfield-Wolf Award for Memoir/Autobiography, and the Libby Book Award for Best Comic/Graphic Novel, all for her debut graphic memoir, Feeding Ghosts. Hulls was a finalist for the Kirkus Prize for Nonfiction, longlisted for the Carnegie Medal for Illustration, and shortlisted for the Pacific Northwest Book Award. Feeding Ghosts was named one of the best books of 2025 by Time, Forbes, NPR, The Minnesota Star Tribune, LitHub, Publishers Weekly, Library Journal, and the Chicago Public Library.
