= Mike Farley (actor) =

Actor and Henry VIII lookalike

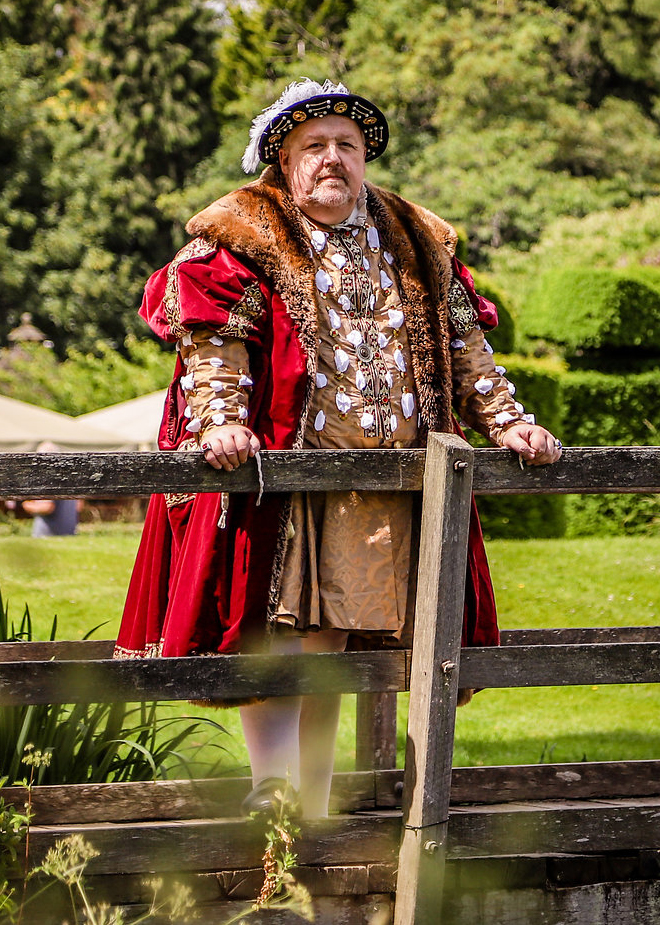
- Farley in costume as Henry VIII
- Occupation(s): Actor, impersonator, educator

Mike Farley was born in Essex in 1967. He is a professional writer, performer and voice artist, best-known as a Henry the Eighth lookalike and game-show participant. He is married, with one son.

== Career ==
Farley started out as a computer programmer and amateur actor, performing at London Fringe Theatres and at the Edinburgh Festival Fringe in the late 1980s and 1990s. In June 2004, Farley became a full-time professional Henry VIII. He has since made numerous appearances on TV and Radio including BBC1’s Children in Need, Daybreak, BBC Radio 4 Saturday Live Scott Mills and was a repeat contributor to BBC Radio 5 Live’s Danny Baker Show.

Farley has been resident Henry VIII for a number of castles in England and Wales, including Hever Castle and Leeds Castle

In his capacity as Henry VIII, Farley has performed in plays, pageants and on film.

He is widely-known for his performances in schools as part of the National Curriculum. His objection to the removal of The Tudors from the National Curriculum under Michael Gove was widely reported in the national press. Farley was also featured as part of the missing words round in an episode of Have I Got News For You, “Henry VIII’s life ruined by … Michael Gove”.

Farley has participated in a number of television game shows, most notably, in February 2019, in The Chase and in August 2019, in Who Wants to be a Millionnaire, where he won £64,000.

Farley has written and starred as King Henry in two short films, the first for Hever Castle: “The Six Wives of Henry VIII in Four Minutes” (2013) and “Henry VIII – And All Because The Lady Loves” (2017).

== Film shorts ==
- The Six Wives of Henry VIII in Four Minutes (2013)
- Henry VIII – And All Because the Lady Loves (2017)
