= Find My =

Asset tracking app

- The Find My app on iOS 17
- Developer: Apple
- Release: June 17, 2009; 17 years ago (as Find My iPhone); September 19, 2019; 7 years ago (as Find My)
- Stable release: macOS: 4.0
- Operating system: iOS 13 or later; iPadOS 13 or later; macOS Catalina or later
- Predecessor: Find My iPhone, Find My Friends
- Type: Location aware Asset tracking
- License: Proprietary license
- Website: apple.com/icloud/find-my

Find My is an asset tracking service operated by Apple that enables users to track the location of iOS, iPadOS, macOS, watchOS, visionOS devices, AirPods, AirTags, and a number of supported third-party accessories with the Find My Network Accessory Program through a connected iCloud account. Users can also show their primary device's geographic location to others, and can view the location of others who choose to share their location. Find My was released alongside iOS 13 on September 19, 2019, merging the functions of the former Find My iPhone (known on Mac computers as Find My Mac) and Find My Friends into a single app. On watchOS 26 and earlier, Find My was separated into three different applications: Find Devices, Find People and Find Items.

After its release on iOS, Find My was released on iPadOS 13.1 on September 24, 2019, and macOS 10.15 on October 7, 2019.

== Background ==
The original "Find My iPhone" app was announced on June 10, 2009, and released in June 17, 2009 alongside iPhone OS 3. At the time, it required a paid subscription to Apple's MobileMe service. It was made free of charge with the iOS 4.2.1 update on November 22, 2010, but only for devices introduced in 2010. With the release of iCloud in October 2011, the service became free for all users. A Mac version called "Find My Mac" was added to OS X 10.7 Lion.

"Find My Friends" was announced on October 4, 2011 and released on October 12, 2011, several hours before the release of iOS 5. In October 2015, Find My Friends was added to iCloud.com to view the location of friends from a web browser. "Find my friends" was not the first app that allowed users to see the location of their friends: in 2006 Navizon had already released the "Buddy Tracker" functionality within its mobile app, which was made available on iPhone in 2007.

In iOS 9, both Find My iPhone and Find My Friends became built-in apps, and could not be removed from devices. With the release of iOS 13 and macOS 10.15 Catalina, the functionality of both Find My iPhone and Find My Friends was combined into a single application, Find My.

== Features ==
=== People ===
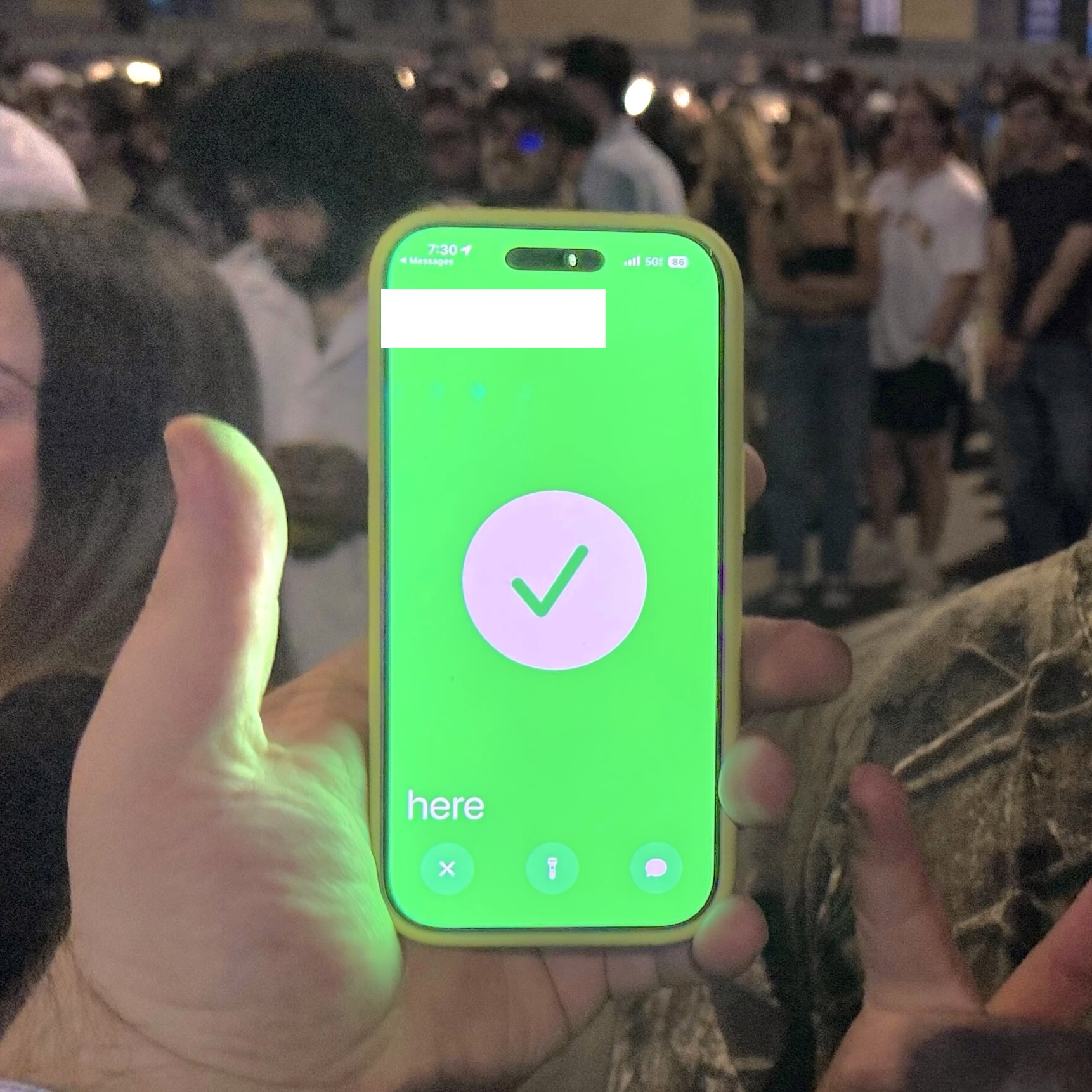
Find My with ultra-wideband being used to find a friend at a crowded concert venue in 2025.

Find My allows users to share their device locations to contacts with an iOS, iPadOS, or MacOS device for an hour, until the end of the day, or indefinitely. Once shared, others are able to see the exact location of a person's device on a map and can receive directions to the person's location. Notifications can be set, alerting a user when someone leaves or arrives at a set location.

=== Devices ===
Users can find the location of their Apple devices and play a sound on the device at maximum volume. A device can also be marked as lost, locking the device with a password and suspending sensitive features such as Apple Wallet. Lost mode also allows a user to leave a message and contact information on the lock screen of the device.

A user can also choose to erase a device, deleting all content and settings, which is useful if the device contains sensitive information; however, the device can no longer be located after this action is performed. After the erase is complete, the message can still be displayed and the device will be activation locked. This makes it hard for someone to use or sell the device. An Apple ID password is required to turn off Find My, sign out of iCloud, erase the device, or reactivate a device after an activation lock.

Since iOS 15, Apple added a feature to locate an iPhone 11 or later for up to 5 hours after the battery is nominally drained, or up to 24 if it was powered off manually by the user (iPhone SE models excluded), through the power reserve feature.

To be eligible to claim on a stolen or lost iPhone when covered with AppleCare+ with theft and loss coverage, Find My must be active on the user's device.

=== Items ===
With the release of iOS 14.3, third-party Bluetooth items and accessories with support for the Find My network accessory program can also be tracked, under a separate "Items" tab. If something is lost but out of Bluetooth range, the app will display the last known location until another iOS, iPadOS, or macOS device is nearby. Similar to Apple's own devices, third-party items can be placed into a "lost mode" which prevents others from pairing to the device. Lost items can be identified from within the Find My app, allowing a user to see a message or contact information from the owner of the lost item.

AirTags also use ultra-wideband technology to find lost items, if the Apple device used for searching supports it (iPhone 11 or later, except iPhone SE and iPhone 16e models).

Starting 2024, Apple partnered with some airlines that will use the Find My Items location as part of their customer service process to locate lost and delayed baggage.

== Lawsuits and privacy concerns ==
=== Friends ===
Find My, as well as its predecessor Find My Friends, raised privacy issues arising from tracking a user's location, without notification. Several safety features mean a user shares their location only with people they choose and can revoke permission at any time. "Friends" can track only users who have accepted an access request. A user can remove a person from access at any time or make the tracking temporary.

=== Third parties ===
The introduction of item tracking has prompted concern that the device could be used to track someone without their knowledge by placing an AirTag in their belongings. Several lawsuits were filed by people being stalked through the misuse of AirTags.

In an attempt to prevent stalking Apple has introduced notifications which alert users if they are being followed by an unknown device. If the mobile device detects an AirTag, not associated with the owner's account, being regularly detected nearby, it issues an alert to the user. Apple will ask you to check the Find My app on your device to analyze the options to disable the tracking, and also to locate the AirTag. It is also possible to see how long the AirTag has been detected in the user's proximity and the location of the first detection. Research from 2023, after the introduction of Apple's counter-measures, still shows that it is possible to use AirTags to track people without being detected, posing new privacy concerns.

=== Patent infringement ===
In 2013, Remote Locator Systems sued Apple for patent infringement regarding the Find My iPhone app. In 2018, an ex-engineer sued the company for the same app, in particular for not including his name as an inventor of five patent applications, including the ideas behind the "Find My iPhone" .

In 2018, Agis Software sued Apple for patent infringement regarding the Find My Friends app. Apple named Navizon as co-defendant and called it to testify, in order to demonstrate that its Buddy Finder was prior art to Agis Software's patent.

== See also ==
- Find Hub
- Tile (company)
- Life360
- iBeacon
