= Key finder =

Electronic device to locate lost objects

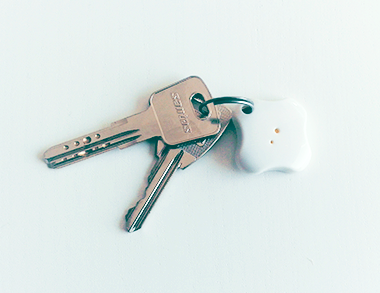
A Bluetooth-based key finder

Key finders, also known as keyfinders, key locators, or electronic finders, are small electronic devices fitted to objects to locate them when misplaced or stolen, such as keys, luggage, purses, wallets, pets, laptop computers, toddlers, cellphones, equipment, or tools, and to transmit alerts, e.g., that one's restaurant table is ready or a nurse is needed. Some key finders beep or flash lights on demand.

== Types ==
=== Sound-based ===
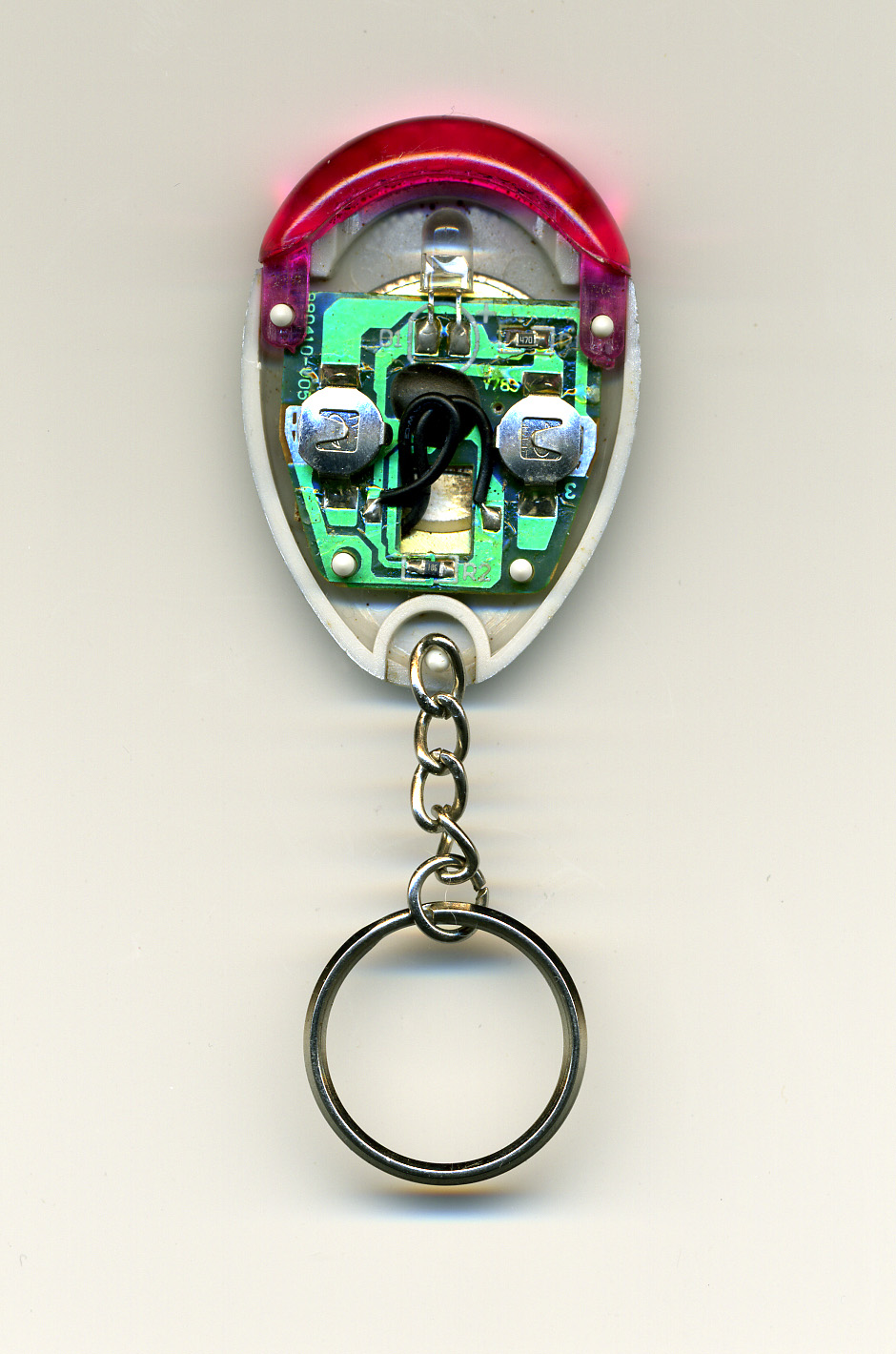
Interior of a sound-based key finder

Early models of key finders were sound-based, and listened for a clap or whistle (or a sequence of same), then beeped for the user to find them. Determining what was a clap or a whistle proved difficult, resulting in poor performance and false alarms. Because of this low quality and unreliability, these early key finders were soon discarded and were unpopular for serious needs.

=== Radio ===
As electronics became smaller and cheaper, and battery life improved, radio became viable to locate the keys, which were fitted with a small receiver. A separate transmitter is used to activate one or more receivers. All wireless key finders have to "listen" for a searching transmission, resulting in battery replacement at intervals ranging from three months to a year. Using a radio signal removes the risk of false alarms.

Some distributors include a cost-effective key-return service that assists in returning the keys should they be lost in a taxi, bus or other public place, provided the customer registered their devices and contact information. The transmitter can also contain information to help return it to its rightful owner.

=== Peer-to-peer ===
Peer-to-peer key finders no longer require a separate "base". They are all functionally identical and based on a communication system wherein each device can find all the others individually. The user can, for example, use a digital wallet to find misplaced keys and vice versa, or a mobile phone to find a lost TV remote control or eyeglasses. In addition, since the keyfinders have their own transmitters, they can reply to each other by radio as well as by beeping and flashing a light to attract attention. The seeking unit can then follow this beacon to find even a buried set of keys. Having a transmitter in each unit also means that, unlike second-generation units, losing a single transmitter does not result in total loss of the ability to find other items it tracks.

=== Bluetooth low energy beacon ===
Modern key finders use a Bluetooth low energy beacon to broadcast a uniqueID that is picked up by nearby phones running the appropriate software, that is then reported to the manufacturer's website along with the location where they picked up the signal. Even though different manufacturers use the same underlying technology and standards, their apps do not share information with one another, so each manufacturer requires a different app for its devices.

== Use in a criminal context ==
Tracking devices have been implicated in criminal activity, such as stalking and identifying when properties are empty. Safeguards built in to some tracking devices to notify a person when they are being tracked, are compromised because devices can be turned off once tracking is undertaken sufficiently, can be muffled or hidden out of view, or require an app to notify of illicit tracking, which is not usually in use by a victim.

== See also ==
- AirTag
- Bluetooth
- GPS
- Location-based service (LBS)
- Samsung Galaxy SmartTag
- Tile (company)
- TrackR

== Bibliography ==
- http://www.uspto.gov Patent# 6,774,787 Electronic locator system and method
