= TrackR =

Key finder

- Type: Private
- Founded: 2009; 17 years ago
- Founders: Chris Herbert; Christian Smith
- Headquarters: Santa Barbara, California, U.S.
- Website: thetrackr.com

TrackR was a commercial key finder that assisted in the tracking of lost belongings and devices. TrackR was produced by the company Phone Halo and was inspired by the founders' losing their keys on a beach during a surfing trip.

The founders of Phone Halo began working on TrackR in 2009. In 2010, they founded the company and launched the product. In Winter 2018, TrackR rebranded itself to Adero, as part of changing its focus to other uses for its tracking technology, taking TrackR beyond the Bluetooth fobs that had been the core of its service. TrackR shut down its services and removed its apps in August 2021.

== Overview ==
The device contains a lithium battery that needs to be changed about once a year by the user. It communicates its current location via Bluetooth 4.0, to an Android 4.4+ or iOS 8.0+ mobile device on which the TrackR app is installed and running. This feature is referred to as "Crowd Locate", since each device will report its location to all other TrackR devices in range, including those that are neither owned nor registered by the user. This feature is useful because the app must be installed and running on a nearby Bluetooth enabled device for any device's location to be relayed.

As of August 2017, over 5 million TrackR devices had been sold.

As of August 2021, the official website stated that the manufacturer has discontinued App support for both Apple and Android devices.

== Technical data ==
For Trackr Bravo, the producer published the following data as of August 2017:

Specifications

	TrackR				Tracker	tile			Slightech	Chipolo		XYFindit	Lapa		PebbleBee		
	Wallet (TrackR)	Bravo G1 (TB001) (no ringer hole)	Bravo G2 (1 ringer hole)	Pixel	Sticker	tile G2 (3 ringer holes)	mate	slim	MYNT	Chipolo	Chipolo Plus	XY3	Lapa (G1)	Lapa 2	PebbleBee	PebbleBee Stone	PebbleBee Finder
Sold since		ca. Jan 2015	ca. Oct 2016	<= Aug 2017	ca. Jul 2014	ca. Oct 2016	<= Aug 2017	<= Aug 2017	discontinued			<= Aug 2016		Mar 2016	ca. Oct 2014	ca. Mar 2016	ca. Dec 2016
Case material	black plastics	colored anodized aluminium		black plastics	black plastics	white plastics	white plastics	white plastics	colored			colored					white or blk plastics in metal cylinder
Diameter	65x40 mm bowed rectangular	31 mm (1.22") + eyelet		26.2 mm (1.03")	24 mm (0.98")	(>34x>34 mm) square + big hole	34x34 mm square + hole	54x54 mm square (no hole)	oval + eyelet			hexagonal				triangle round	ca. 25 mm
Thickness	4 mm	3.5 mm (0.14")		5.6 mm (0.22")	4.1 mm (0.16")		4,65 mm	2,4 mm								pebble-like + silicon sleeve	ca. 10 mm
Weight (incl. batt.)					4.5 g (0.15 oz)												
Attachment		bent eyelet		loop (thread)		big hole	smaller hole	(no hole)	eyelet								thru cylinder
Battery type	2x CR2016	CR1616	CR1620	CR2016	CR2016												CR2032
Battery life	2 years	1 year		1 year	1 year	1 year											
Battery exchange	by user	by user	by user	by user	by user	not discounted exchange of device	?	?	?	by user							
Bluetooth	4.0	BLE 4.0		BLE 4.0	BLE 4.0												
Bluetooth range	up to 30 m (100 ft)	less than G2	up to 30 m (100 ft)	up to 30 m (100 ft)	up to 30 m (100 ft)												
Device Ringer Volume	Up to 92 dB	less than 2nd ed.	Up to 82 dB	Up to 90 dB													"loud"
Remarks								tile has 5 mio. units sold	MacOSX 10.10+, water sleeve	remote camera shutter; App off: iOS is active		water resistant					heavier, long range
CR1620 (16 mm diameter, 2.0 mm height); G1 = Generation/Edition 1, ...
Further or older editions: tile SPORT; Pebble Bee: Honey, Finder; key finders: https://wiki.ezvid.com/best-key-finders

== See also ==
- Key finder
- Tile (company)
- AirTag
