= Tile (company) =

American consumer electronics company

Tile, Inc.
- Company type: Subsidiary
- Founded: December 2012; 13 years ago
- Headquarters: San Mateo, California, United States
- Creators: Mike Farley; Nick Evans
- Industry: Consumer electronics
- Products: Key finder devices
- Parent: Life360
- Website: www.tile.com
- Native clients on: iOS, Android

Tile, Inc. (stylized as tile) is an American consumer electronics company which produces tracking devices that users can attach to their belongings such as keys and backpacks. A companion mobile app for Android and iOS allows users to track the devices using Bluetooth 4.0 in order to locate lost items or to view their last detected location. The first devices were delivered in 2013. In September 2015, Tile launched a newer line of hardware that includes functionality to assist users in locating smartphones, as well as other feature upgrades. In August 2017, two new versions of the Tile were launched, the Tile Sport and Tile Style. As of 2019, Tile's hardware offerings consist of the Pro, Mate, Slim, and Sticker.

Since September 2018, former GoPro executive C. J. Prober has been the CEO of Tile after he replaced co-founder Mike Farley. In November 2021, Life360 agreed to acquire Tile in a $205 million acquisition, and is expected to integrate the two services.

== Function ==
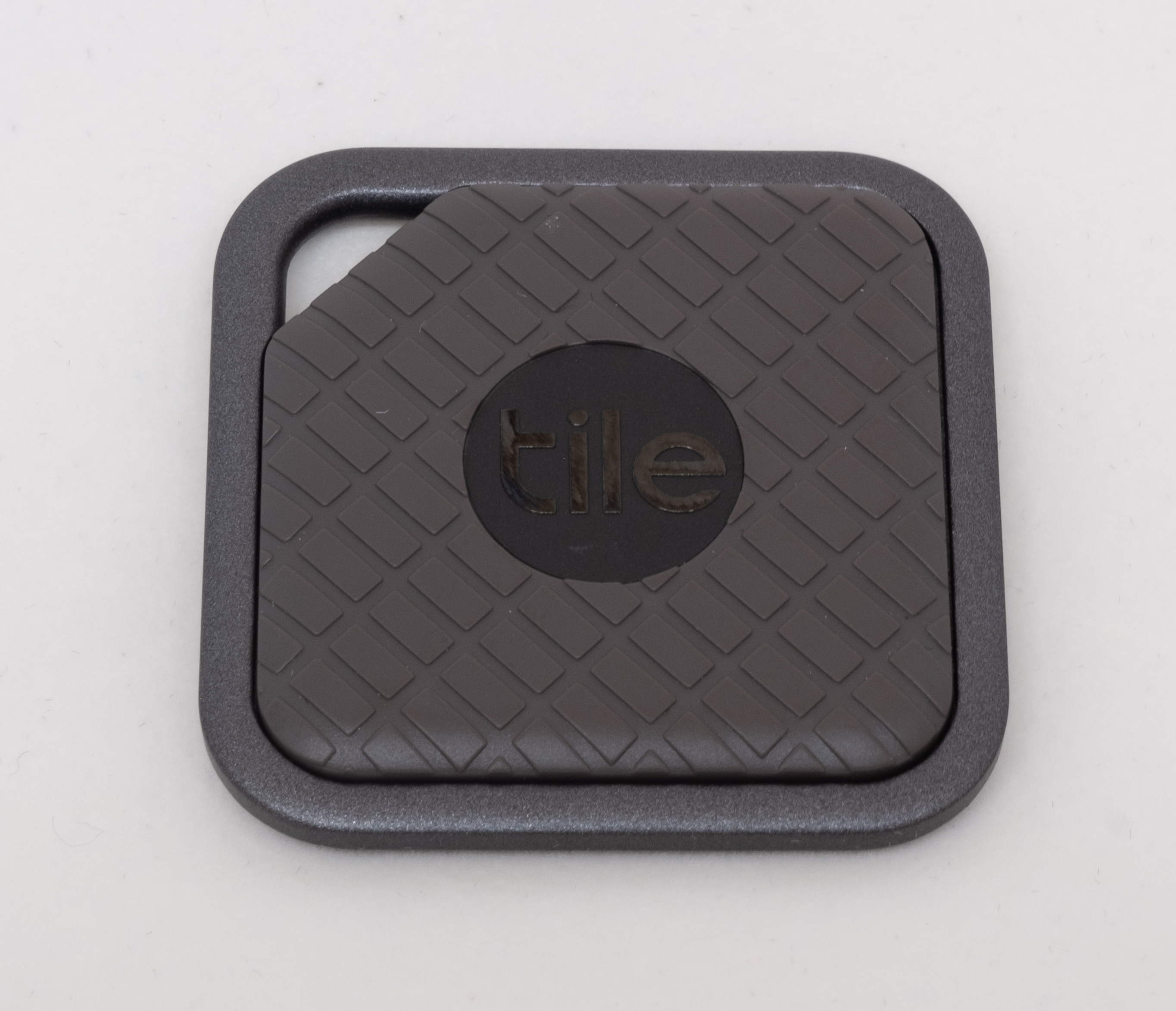
Tile Sport

Tile manufactures hardware devices, "Tiles", that can be attached to items such as keychains. By attaching the device, a user can later use the Tile app to help locate the item if it is lost. The Tile application uses Bluetooth Low Energy 4.0 radio technology to locate Tiles within a 100 foot (30 meters) range, depending on the model. Each Tile comes with a built-in speaker, and the user is able to trigger the device to play a sound to aid in the location of items at close range. The second generation of Tile devices produce sound at a volume of 90 decibels, which is three times as loud as the previous generation of products. The second generation also added a "Find My Phone" feature, which can be used to produce a sound on the user's paired smartphone when the user presses a button on the Tile device.

The Tile app can locate Tiles beyond the 100 foot (30 m) Bluetooth range by using "crowd GPS". If a Tile device is reported as lost and comes within range of any smartphone running the Tile app, the nearby user's app will send the item's owner an anonymous update of the lost item's location. Users can also share their Tiles with others, which allows both participants to locate shared Tiles.

Tile's first generation products have built-in batteries with a battery life of about one year. Owners of these devices were automatically notified when the batteries were nearing depletion and were eligible to receive a discount on a replacement product. Users could then return Tiles with depleted batteries in order for them to be recycled. In October 2018, the Tile Mate and Tile Pro were redesigned to have user-replaceable batteries. These models have lower water-resistance ratings than models that require factory battery replacement.

== Funding ==
Tile's developers used Selfstarter, an open source website platform, to crowdfund the project through pre-orders.

As of July 7, 2013, Tile had raised over US$2.6 million by selling preordered Tiles directly to 50,000 backers through their website.

In 2014, Tile raised additional Series A funding of US$13 million led by GGV Capital and a further US$3 million from Khosla Ventures in 2015.

== Dispute with Apple ==
In May 2020, Tile sought assistance from the European Union in a dispute it had with Apple regarding the provision of its services on Apple devices. It claimed that its app was not activated on Apple devices while the Find My service provided by Apple is activated automatically. Apple denied the allegation. In September 2020, Tile joined the Coalition for App Fairness which aims to reach better conditions for the inclusion of apps into app stores.

== Hacking incident ==
In 2024 a computer hacker acquired the credentials of a suspected former Tile employee and gained access to the company's internal tool that processes location data for law enforcement, as well as customer data such as names, addresses, emails, telephone numbers, and order information. Other functions that were compromised include changing the email address linked to a particular device and creating administrative users. Tile said only its customer support platform, not the service platform, was breached and it has disabled credentials to prevent further unauthorized access.

== Privacy issues ==
In September 2025, a group of researchers from Georgia Tech warned that Tile's Bluetooth trackers leak identifying data in plain text, in contrast to Life360's guarantees about security and privacy. The researchers alleged Tile's setup was giving stalkers an easy way to track victims. According to the research, notable flaws were Tile servers storing tag locations, MAC addresses, and unique ID codes without end-to-end encryption, and the tags broadcasting unencrypted Bluetooth signals, allowing others to track someone else's device.

== See also ==
- AirTag
- TrackR
