= Find Hub =

Asset tracking app and service

- Developer: Google
- Release: 2 August 2013; 13 years ago

Stable release(s) [±]
- Android: 3.1.636-1 / June 3, 2026; 4 months ago
- Wear OS: 1.0.364-0 / June 15, 2026; 4 months ago
- Operating system: Android 6+; Wear OS; Web; Discontinued: Android 5 (2025)
- Type: Asset tracking
- Website: www.google.com/android/find

Find Hub, formerly known as Find My Device, is an asset tracking service provided by Google to remotely trace, locate and wipe devices that are compatible with the Find My Device network. It was initially launched on 2 August 2013.

== Background ==
In August 2013, the initial service only allowed Android devices to be found. In April 2024 an expanded Find My Device network launched, enabling the crowdsourcing of data from Android phones & tablets to assist in finding other devices on the network via Bluetooth. This has allowed for offline finding, as well as support for more items on the service, such as tracker tags initially from Chipolo and Pebblebee. These trackers are marked as supporting Google's Find My Device network via a badge on their product marketing. The Find My Device network was announced in Google I/O 2023, to be released in July in the same year, before being delayed awaiting a new industry specification aimed to prevent unwanted tracking. A draft of this specification was released in December 2023, and has been implemented in iOS 17.5.

The expanded network implements several safety systems. The DULT specification allowed for unknown tracker alerts on Apple devices for Find My Device network trackers, while alerts for Apple Find My trackers on Android devices was launched in summer 2023. In both cases, users are able to disable, ring or see information about the tracker.

In 2025, Google announced at "The Android Show: I/O Edition" that the service would be rebranded as Find Hub.

== Features ==
Find Hub locates and traces missing Android-powered smartphones, tablets, headphones/earphones, and Wear OS-powered smartwatches. Users have options to play a sound at maximum volume for 5 minutes, secure the device & force it to sign out of its associated Google Account, or erase the device entirely, including sensitive cards such as keys and IDs in Wallet.

"Works with Android - Find Hub" badge

=== Offline Devices ===
Google offers a feature to locate the Pixel 8, 8a, and subsequent Pixels for several hours after the battery has run out. The Pixel's "find offline devices" setting must be set to "with network in high-traffic areas only" or "with network in all areas."

=== Items ===
With the release of the Find My Device network, third-party Bluetooth items and accessories with support for the Find My Device network accessory program can also be tracked with the app. If something is lost but out of Bluetooth range, the app will display the last known location until another Android device is nearby. Third-party items can be placed into a "lost mode," which prevents others from pairing to the device. Lost items can be identified from within the Find My Device app, allowing a user to see a message or contact information from the owner of the lost item.

To be Find My Device certified, devices must support Google Fast Pair Service which utilizes Bluetooth Low Energy (BLE) to discover nearby Bluetooth devices without using significant phone battery. The Google Fast Pair specification requires a device to have an advertise signal no larger than 100 ms (10 Hz) when in discoverable mode and should be at most 250 ms (4 Hz) when in non-discoverable mode, enabling "magical" scenarios based on device proximity.

As of December 2025, many trackers from various companies are compatible with Find My Device network, including those from Chipolo, Pebblebee, and Motorola.

== See also ==
- Find My
- Tile (company)
