= Android Developer Challenge =

Programming contest by Google

Samsung Galaxy Z, example a of modern Android phone

The Android Developer Challenge (ADC) was launched by Google in 2008, with the aim of providing awards for high-quality mobile applications built on the Android mobile operating system. In November 2009, the winners of Android Developers Challenge II were selected after two rounds of scoring by thousands of Android users as well as an official panel of judges. The overall winners of ADC II were SweetDreams, What the Doodle!? and WaveSecure.

== History ==
Android is a software stack for mobile devices that includes an operating system, middleware and key applications. The Android SDK provides the tools and APIs necessary to begin developing applications that run on Android-powered devices. Android Developer Challenge was a competition for the most innovative applications for Android. Google offered US$10 million in prizes, distributed between ADC I and ADC II.

All entries were judged by a panel of experts in the fields of mobile devices, cellular telecommunications, software development or technology innovation. Google selected the judges from the member organizations of the Open Handset Alliance, Google and mobile experts.

== Android Developer Challenge I ==
The Android Developer Challenge was first announced in January, with submissions being accepted from 2 January to 14 April 2008. With participants from over 70 countries and a total of 1,788 entries, the ADC was an immediate success, and the Android Developers' blog reported a submission rate of 170+ submissions per hour on 14 April.

Developers from the United States accounted for one-third of the total applications while the rest came from countries such as Germany, Japan, China, India, Canada, France, UK, and many others. The entries represented a diverse range of application areas, including games, social-networking applications, utilities and productivity and developer tools.

A panel of over 100 judges received judging packets and laptops that were preloaded with all the submissions, for a consistent, fair environment to judge the submissions. After three weeks of rigorous analysis, the judges released a list of 50 first round winners, who were then eligible to participate in the final round. These 50 most promising entries, announced on 5 May 2008, each received a $25,000 award to fund further development. The finalists were then given a deadline of 30 June 2008 to submit their applications for the final round. The competition concluded with the announcement of ten teams that received $275,000 each, and ten teams that received $100,000 each. The entire list of $275,000 Award Recipients, $100,000 Award Recipients, Finalists and Judges can be viewed here.

== Android Developers Challenge II ==
ADC II was announced on 27 May 2009., calling developers to submit their apps to one of ten specially designated ADC II categories in August. The categories were:

- Education/Reference
- Games: Casual/Puzzle
- Games: Arcade/Action
- Social Networking
- Lifestyle
- Productivity/Tools
- Media
- Entertainment
- Travel
- Misc

Applicants were allowed to submit their applications to a single category only. The winners were selected after two rounds of scoring by thousands of Android users as well as an official panel of judges.

=== Eligibility ===
The ADC II contest was open only to applications that had not been made publicly available through the Android Market prior to August 1, 2009. Additionally, applications that were entered in the ADC I contest were ineligible for the ADC II contest, regardless whether they were winning apps. Similarly, updated versions of applications entered in the ADC 1 contest were ineligible for ADC II.

=== First round, ADC II ===
In September 2009, users of Android-powered handsets that could access the Android Market were able to obtain a special ADC II judging application from the Android Market. With this app, they could download, test, and rank applications submitted to the challenge. Users choosing to participate in the review process downloaded submitted apps randomly and rated them along a number of criteria, resulting in a final score for each app. The results from this first round generated the top 20 applications in each of the 10 categories (200 apps total), which went into the second round. The first round of the ADC II closed on 6 October 2009. The first-round winners were announced on 5 November 2009.

=== Second round, ADC II ===
Voting for the second round opened on the same day and ended on November 25. Android users were able to download the final top 20 applications in each category and evaluate them in the same manner as during the first round using the ADC 2 judging app. At the end of the voting period, applications in each category were ranked, with the community vote constituting 40% of the final judging score. Along with the public ranking, a team of Google-selected judges evaluated the applications. Their scores constituted 60% of the final score.

Google announced the top winners of ADC II on November 30, with SweetDreams, What the Doodle!? and WaveSecure being nominated the overall winners of the challenge. Furthermore, 1st, 2nd and 3rd prizes were awarded in each of the 10 categories.

== See also ==
- Android (operating system)
