= Apple Account =

Apple device authentication method

Apple Account, formerly known as Apple ID, is a user account by Apple for their devices and software. Apple Accounts contain the user's personal data and settings, and when an Apple Account is used to log in to an Apple device, the device will automatically use the data and settings associated with the Apple Account.

== Usage ==
=== Account creation ===
An Apple Account can be created by going to the associated website.

As of December 2024, Apple has deprecated security questions and made two-factor authentication mandatory for activating iTunes & App Store functionality on a newly created account – a process that requires a device with iOS 13.4 (for iPhone or iPod Touch), iPadOS 13.4, macOS 10.15.4 or later. New Apple Accounts that have not set-up 2FA only have limited access to web-based media services that do not involve personal data or device management, such as Apple Music, Apple TV, Apple Podcasts on the web.

=== Modification ===
Users can change their passwords or personal information on the My Apple Account page by selecting the "Manage your account" link. Changes that a user makes to an Apple Account, whilst they are using one Apple product, are also recognized by other applications where the user uses the same Apple Account (for example, the online Apple Store, iCloud, or Photos). Apple will send a verification message to the email address provided, and the user is required to follow the URL included in the verification email to confirm the changes. After confirming the changes, users may still be asked to verify their information the next time they use their Apple Account to purchase, such as using the App Store.

=== Multiple Apple Accounts ===
Users can use different Apple Accounts for their store purchases and their iCloud storage and other uses. This includes many MobileMe users who have always had difficulties as they were forced to use more than one Apple Account, because on signing up to the MobileMe service a new Apple Account was automatically created using the me.com email address being created at the time, meaning users could not change their previous Apple Account email address to be their me.com email address, and it has always remained so. Apple does not permit different accounts to be merged. However, if one account is disabled (in most cases, due to fraudulent transactions or other abusive activity or for security reasons), any other accounts associated with the primary account will also be disabled, and the user cannot create any new accounts until the affected account has been unlocked.

=== Apple Online Store ===
An Apple Account is not required to place an order with Apple. Apple lets buyers place orders on its online store without an Apple Account by using the Guest Checkout Feature. An Apple Account and the Guest Checkout Feature both allow the customer to access order info such as invoices, check the order status, and track the shipping package. However, Apple Accounts allow users to customize their Apple Online Store experiences. Users can save items they are interested in purchasing; save a cart if they are almost ready to place an order; save shipping and billing addresses and payment information to speed up the checkout process; use 1-Click ordering on Apple's website and check Apple Gift Card balances.

=== iCloud ===
iCloud allows users to store data such as music and iOS applications on remote computer servers for download to multiple devices, such as iOS-based devices running iOS 5 or later, and personal computers running OS X 10.7.2 Lion or later, or Microsoft Windows (Windows Vista service pack 2 or later). iCloud replaced Apple's MobileMe service, acting as a data syncing center for email, contacts, calendars, bookmarks, notes, reminders (to-do lists), iWork documents, photos and other data. The service also allows users to wirelessly back up their iOS devices to iCloud instead of manually doing so using iTunes.

Every Apple Account comes with 5 GB of free storage. More storage is available with a iCloud+ subscription.

== Security ==
An Apple Account is a valid email address, protected by a password set by the user of at least eight characters. Apple will send a verification email to the email address the user provided, and the user is required to follow the URL included in the verification email to activate the account. It is possible to create an Apple Account without specifying a credit card.

In March 2013, Apple launched two-factor authentication for Apple Account. The feature uses the Find My service to send a four-digit pin code to a trusted device associated with the Apple Account when the second verification step is required for authentication.

On June 9, 2019, Apple unveiled a single sign-on provider built around Apple Account known as "Sign In with Apple". Based on OAuth 2.0 and OpenID Connect, it is designed as a privacy-focused alternative to other social login services, minimizing the amount of personal information sent to a service, and allowing the use of disposable email addresses forwarding to the user's Apple Account email.

=== Retrieval ===
An Apple Account may be disabled for security reasons if the password is entered incorrectly multiple times. The user will be warned with a message when the account has been disabled. Apple Accounts and passwords can be retrieved by answering account security questions on iForgot or by resetting from a trusted device with iCloud enabled and an unlock passcode set. For security reasons, if Recovery Key or Two-Step Verification (not Two-Factor Authentication) is turned on, Apple will not reset the password for an Apple Account. To reset the password when these security features are enabled, both the Recovery Key and at least one trusted device is required.

==== Disabled accounts ====
Another error is "Your Apple Account has been disabled" without specific disclosure of a reason. The cause of this suspension is most likely due to a violation of the Apple Media Services Terms and Conditions (i.e., due to scams and other fraudulent activities) and resetting one's password does not clear it. It has been reported as occurring on iOS devices as well as on Macs and PCs. One can request a review of an Apple Account by contacting iTunes Store support at www.apple.com/support/itunes. As of August 2021, due to the accuracy of the system, the decisions to disable Apple Accounts are rarely overturned, as the likelihood that the system would incorrectly disable any given Apple Account is less than one in one trillion per year (most likely due to CSAM detection, a safety feature that Apple had proposed but was later shelved).

In both of the above cases, the user's profile will not be visible to anyone on iMessage or FaceTime, and they will not be able to sign in. The issue needs to be resolved within a set period (approximately 14–30 days in most cases). If too much time has passed since the Apple Account has been disabled, it will be permanently disabled and the user can no longer unlock it nor create any new Apple Accounts.

=== Encryption ===
Every iCloud automatically has standard data protection. All data is encrypted, and encryption keys are stored securely in Apple data centers to assist in case of account recovery. Only certain data is end-to-end encrypted, including iCloud Mail, Photos, and health data. In total, fourteen services are end-to-end encrypted.

Additionally, Apple offers Advanced Data Protection for iCloud, which is targeted at an audience of politicians, journalists, and other people who have important data on their iCloud accounts. With this, twenty-three services are end-to-end encrypted. If one loses access to an account with Advanced Data Protection, it is more difficult to recover the account.

== See also ==
- Apple Developer
