= List of Apple Inc. media events =

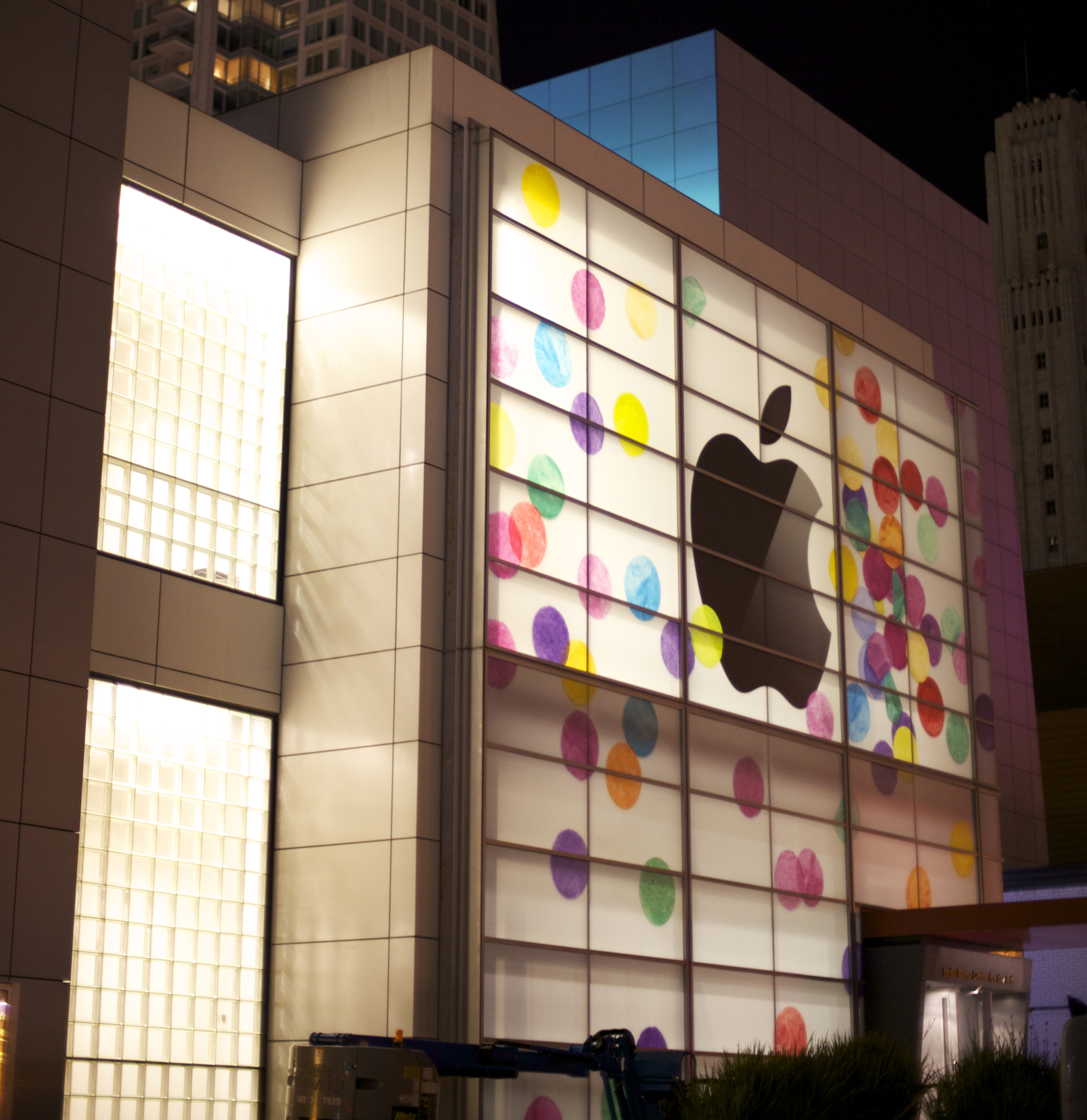
The exterior of the Yerba Buena Center for the Arts prepared for the unveiling of Apple's iPad 2 on March 2, 2011

Apple Inc. has announced major new and redesigned products and upgrades at press conferences, while minor updates are often announced through press releases on Apple Newsroom. These press conferences have historically attracted significant attention from traditional and online media. The detailed agenda of an event is often kept secret to generate buzz and is revealed only during the event, although event taglines sometimes provide hints. These events are usually streamed live on Apple's website and YouTube channel. Video replays of most Apple events since 2007 are available on Apple's Apple Podcasts channel, under the "Apple Events" podcast.

Apple has often announced new products at the annual Worldwide Developers Conference (WWDC), despite the conference's primary focus on software.

Apple has held events at the following venues:

- Moscone West, San Francisco
- Yerba Buena Center for the Arts, San Francisco
- Bill Graham Civic Auditorium, San Francisco
- Flint Center, Cupertino
- McEnery Convention Center, San Jose
- Steve Jobs Theater (Apple Park), Cupertino
- Brooklyn Academy of Music, New York City
- Online-only (2020–March 2022, due to the COVID-19 pandemic)
- Both online and in person (June 2022–present)

== 1984 ==
=== Macintosh event (January 24, 1984) ===
The Macintosh was shown to shareholders at the Flint Center in Cupertino.

=== Macintosh event (Boston Computer Society) ===
The Macintosh was shown for a second time less than a week after the first event.

=== Apple II Forever event (April 1984) ===
The Apple II Forever Event was held in April 1984. Apple introduced the Apple IIc.

== 1990 ==
=== WWDC 1990 (May 1990) ===
Apple's 1st annual Worldwide Developers Conference was held from May 7 to 11, 1990.

== 1991 ==
=== WWDC 1991 (May 1991) ===
Apple's 2nd annual Worldwide Developers Conference was held from May 13 to 17, 1991. At the conference, Apple announced the first public demonstration of the QuickTime video player.

== 1992 ==
=== WWDC 1992 (May 1992) ===
Apple's 3rd annual Worldwide Developers Conference was held from May 11 to 15, 1992.

== 1993 ==
=== WWDC 1993 (May 1993) ===
Apple's 4th annual Worldwide Developers Conference was held from May 10 to 14, 1993.

== 1994 ==
=== WWDC 1994 (May 1994) ===
Apple's 5th annual Worldwide Developers Conference was held from May 15 to 20, 1994.

== 1995 ==
=== WWDC 1995 (May 1995) ===
Apple's 6th annual Worldwide Developers Conference was held from May 8 to 12, 1995. WWDC'95 almost mainly focused on Copland, a new operating system meant to replace the classic Mac OS. The project was delayed due to feature creep and was never released for the general public due to stability issues.

== 1996 ==
=== WWDC 1996 (May 1996) ===
Apple's 7th annual Worldwide Developers Conference was held from May 13 to 17, 1996.

== 1997 ==
=== MacWorld Expo and NeXT technology announcement (January 7, 1997) ===
Gil Amelio announced that Apple would be integrating operating system technology from NeXT Software into future Apple operating systems. (Apple had purchased NeXT a few weeks beforehand.) Steve Jobs spoke about the technology NeXT was bringing to Apple.

=== WWDC 1997 ===
Apple's 8th annual Worldwide Developers Conference was held from May 12 to 16, 1997.

== 1998 ==
=== Seybold Seminars New York (1998) ===
Steve Jobs introduced the first Apple Studio Display. It was Apple's first desktop monitor to use LCD technology instead of CRT technology.

=== Apple event (May 1998) ===
Steve Jobs introduced the original iMac. The event was held at the Flint Center.

=== WWDC 1998 (May 11-15, 1998) ===
Apple's 9th annual Worldwide Developers Conference was held at the San Jose Convention Center.

In an unusual move, Apple announced the first iMac just days before WWDC. During the keynote, interim CEO Steve Jobs briefly recapped the iMac announcement before focusing on technical topics, primarily related to QuickTime and the transition strategy from the classic Mac OS to what would become Mac OS X.

== 1999 ==
=== Macworld San Francisco (January 5, 1999) ===
Macworld San Francisco was held on January 5, 1999. During the keynote on January 5, Steve Jobs presented the newly redesigned Power Macintosh G3, and previewed Mac OS X Server.

=== WWDC 1999 (May 10-14, 1999) ===
WWDC 1999 was held at the San Jose Convention Center.

=== Macworld Expo NY '99 (July 21, 1999) ===
Macworld New York 1999 was held on July 21, 1999. Apple launched the iBook with optional wireless networking.

=== Seybold (1999) ===
Seybold 1999 was held in the late summer.

Steve Jobs announced the PowerPC G4 chip, the Power Mac G4 and the first Apple Cinema Display, a 22-inch LCD.

=== Apple special event (October 5, 1999) ===
The event was held at the Flint Center. Mac OS 9 was shown, the iMac DV was unveiled, and iMovie was introduced. A significant proportion of the audience was made up of Apple employees.

== 2000 ==
=== Macworld 2000 (San Francisco, January 5, 2000) ===
Macworld 2000 was held on January 5, 2000, in San Francisco, and featured the unveiling of the new Aqua user interface and Quartz graphics engine of the upcoming Mac OS X, and Jobs' announcement that Mac OS X 10.0, the first major release of Mac OS X, would ship in January 2001 after a final preview release. (The actual release of Mac OS X happened in March 2001.) Jobs also announced that he had been promoted to full-time CEO of Apple.

=== WWDC 2000 (May 15-19, 2000) ===
The 11th annual WWDC was held at the San Jose Convention Center in San Jose, California.

=== Macworld Expo, New York (July 19, 2000) ===
On July 19, 2000, at the Macworld Expo New York held at the Jacob K. Javits Convention Center, Steve Jobs delivered a keynote introducing several new products.

Key announcements included the iMac DV Special Edition, the Power Mac G4 Cube, three new display models, and a full-surface optical mouse, which was gifted to all attendees. Apple also launched new displays, including a new version of the 22-inch Cinema Display that had an Apple Display Connector (ADC) connector.

== 2001 ==
=== Macworld 2001 (San Francisco) ===
- The PowerBook G4 was announced, featuring a titanium design.
- Updates to Mac OS X were shown.

=== Apple special event (October 23, 2001) ===
Apple introduces the first iPod during a special media event in Cupertino.

== 2002 ==
=== Macworld 2002 (San Francisco, January 7, 2002) ===
Steve Jobs announced:

- The iMac G4, featuring an LCD for the first time in an iMac.
- A new iBook with a 14" screen for $1799, alongside price and spec changes in the existing 12-inch models.
- iPhoto

During the keynote, there was a demonstration of new versions of Adobe software including Adobe Illustrator and Adobe Photoshop.

The keynote was announced to be streamed live over the internet via QuickTime.

The iMac G4 was leaked the night before the event from Time Magazine.

=== Macworld 2002 New York (July 17, 2002) ===
Steve Jobs introduced:

- Mac OS X 10.2 Jaguar, including iCal, iSync, .Mac, and iTunes 3.
- New iPods at lower prices, both 5GB and 10GB models, with the 10GB model having a solid state click wheel. A 20GB model was also introduced. Versions of the iPods for Windows were also announced.
- A new version of the iMac G4 with a 17-inch screen.

=== Apple Expo 2002, Paris (September 10, 2002) ===
Much of the keynote consisted of a demo of Apple's new Mac OS X v10.2 operating system. It was announced that as of January 2003 all new Mac models would boot only into Mac OS X. Steve Jobs also overviewed iCal and iSync and announced the availability of iCal on that day.

== 2003 ==
=== Macworld 2003 (San Francisco, January 20, 2003) ===
Steve Jobs demoed iLife and introduced the 17-inch PowerBook G4.

=== WWDC 2003 (June 23, 2003) ===
Steve Jobs introduces Xcode, the Power Mac G5, and Mac OS X 10.3 Panther.

=== Apple Expo 2003, Paris (September 16, 2003) ===
Steve Jobs announced:

- An updated 17-inch and 12-inch PowerBook G4.
- The first Aluminum 15-inch PowerBook G4.
- A new wireless keyboard and mouse.

== 2004 ==
=== Macworld 2004 (January 6-9, 2004) ===
Macworld 2004 was held at the Moscone Center in San Francisco. Steve Jobs introduced the Xserve G5, Xserve G5 RAID, and iPod Mini. The 10GB iPod also had its storage increased to 15GB for the same price of $299.

=== Apple music event, London (June 15, 2004) ===
Steve Jobs announced that the iTunes Music Store would expand to Europe.

=== WWDC 2004 (June 28, 2004) ===
New Cinema Displays with DVI connectors were announced. Mac OS X Tiger was also announced.

=== Apple music event (October 26, 2004) ===
Steve Jobs introduced the iPod Photo line and a U2 special edition of the iPod.

== 2005 ==
=== Macworld 2005 (January 17, 2005, San Francisco) ===
The iPod Shuffle was announced.

The Mac Mini, iLife '05, and iWork were announced.

Steve Jobs announced that Apple sold more than 4.5 million iPods in the 2004 holiday quarter, compared to 733,000 iPods in the 2003 Holiday quarter.

At the event, Steve Jobs referred to 2005 as the "year of HD video editing."

=== WWDC 2005 (June 6–10, 2005) ===
After a basic market update, Jobs announced that Apple would transition the Macintosh platform to Intel x86 processors after using PowerPC for more than a decade. The keynote featured developers from Wolfram Research, who discussed their experience porting Mathematica to Mac OS X on the Intel platform. The conference consisted of 110 lab sessions and 95 presentation sessions, while more than 500 Apple engineers were on site alongside 3,800 attendees from 45 countries. The band The Wallflowers played at the Apple campus.

=== Apple music event (September 7, 2005) ===
The event was held at the Moscone Convention Center in San Francisco.

Steve Jobs announced:

- The iPod Nano.
- Details about the Motorola ROKR iTunes phone.
- iTunes 5

Jobs also announced that the Harry Potter series of books would be available on the iTunes store as audiobooks.

Kanye West gave a performance. His performance was given after the product announcements. He performed Gold Digger and one other song. The performance was later removed from Apple's online Quicktime stream.

=== Apple special event (October 2005) ===
Steve Jobs announced:

- A new iMac G5 with a front-facing camera built in.
- Photo Booth
- The iPod Video (also known as the fifth-generation iPod)

== 2006 ==
=== Macworld 2006 (January 10, 2006) ===
Apple introduced its first Intel-based computers, the iMac and MacBook Pro. Apple also announced new versions of iLife and iWork: iLife '06 and iWork '06. Apple released the first universal binary version of Mac OS X on the same day (version 10.4.4).

=== Apple special event (February 28, 2006) ===
At the Apple Special Event on February 28, 2006, Steve Jobs announced the iPod Hi-Fi speaker system at the Town Hall conference center in Cupertino.

=== WWDC 2006 (August 7–11, 2006) ===
In 2006, Steve Jobs once again delivered the keynote presentation at the WWDC, which was held from August 7 to August 11 in Moscone Center West, San Francisco. The Mac Pro was announced as a replacement for the Power Mac G5, which was Apple's prior pro desktop computer and the last remaining PowerPC-based Mac. The standard Mac Pro featured two 2.66 GHz dual core Xeon (Woodcrest) processors, 1 GB RAM, 250 GB hard drive, and a 256 MB video card. An Xserve update, based on the dual core Xeons, was also announced. Redundant power and Lights Out Management were further product improvements to Apple's server lineup. While certain key Mac OS X improvements were undisclosed, there were 10 improvements in the next iteration, Mac OS X Leopard (10.5), including: full 64-bit app support, Time Machine, Boot Camp, Front Row, Photo Booth, Spaces (Virtual Desktops), Spotlight enhancements, Core Animation, Universal Access enhancements, Mail enhancements, and Dashboard enhancements (including Dashcode), and iChat enhancements. Along with the Leopard features that were announced, a major revision to the Mac OS X Server product was announced. New features to the Server included: a simplified set-up process, iCal Server (based on the CalDAV standard), Apple Teams (a set of web-based collaborative services), Spotlight Server, and Podcast Producer. The 2006 WWDC attracted 4,200 developers from 48 countries, while there were 140 sessions and 100 hands-on labs for developers. More than 1,000 Apple engineers were present at the event, and the DJ BT performed at the Apple Campus in Cupertino.

=== Apple special event (September 12, 2006) ===
The event was titled, "It's Showtime". Apple announced the Apple TV (code-named iTV at the time), along with refreshes to the iPod line, including the 2nd generation iPod nano and a revised iPod Shuffle.

== 2007 ==
=== Macworld Conference & Expo San Francisco 2007 (January 9, 2007) ===
At Moscone West in San Francisco, Apple introduced the iPhone, with the release date set later in 2007. Besides Jobs, the keynote featured executives from Apple (Phil Schiller), Google (Eric Schmidt), Yahoo (Jerry Yang), and Cingular (Stan Sigman).

Notable Information:

- One year after the announcement of the transition from PowerPC to Intel processors Jobs calls the transition "the smoothest and most successful transition that we've ever seen in the history of our industry".
- Jobs announces that over half of all new Mac sales are to "switchers" - users who have never before owned a Mac.
- Ad: "I'm a Mac, I'm a PC" ad about Windows upgrading to Vista.
- Jobs announces the iPod has become "the world's most popular video player" and the iPod nano is "the world's most popular MP3 player" and the iPod shuffle is "the world's most wearable MP3 player".
- 2 billion (cumulative) songs purchased and downloaded from iTunes.
- 5 million songs purchased and downloaded every day from iTunes.
- Apple becomes the 4th largest retailer of music behind Walmart, Best Buy, and Target - pulling ahead of Amazon.
- Over 350 TV shows now offered on iTunes with 50 million TV shows purchased and downloaded. 1.3 million movies purchased and downloaded.
- Jobs announces Paramount will join as a partner to sell movies on iTunes. A total of 250 movies now offered on iTunes.
- Jobs announces that as of November 2006 NPD reports iPod has 62% share of portable music device market share.
- Ads: 2 versions of iPod "silhouette" commercial featuring Flathead by The Fratellis.
- Update on Apple TV (formerly iTV) with demo. Priced at $299 and set to ship the following month ("February"). Orders available following the keynote.
- Introduction of the iPhone, "a revolutionary product that changes everything". "Today Apple is going to reinvent the phone."
- Introduction of "Multi-Touch", a patented user interface used on the iPhone.
- First iPhone 4 GB model to launch at $499 with a 2-year contract. 8 GB model to launch at $599 with a 2-year contract.
- First iPhones to ship in the United States in June.
- Apple partnering with Cingular as an exclusive partner for the iPhone.
- Renaming of "Apple Computer, Inc" to "Apple Inc." to recognize the shift from being a computer company to a broader technology company.

The following day, Apple shares hit $97.80, an all-time high at that point. In May, Apple's share price passed the $100 mark.

=== WWDC 2007 (June 11–15, 2007) ===
During the event, Apple announced release dates for the first-generation iPhone running the first release of iPhone OS (rebranded as iOS in June 2010).

=== Apple special event (August 7, 2007) ===
Apple presented the first iMacs made from aluminum instead of plastic. The Mac Mini was also refreshed. iLife '08 and iWork '08 were also announced.

=== Apple music event (September 5, 2007) ===
The event was called "The Beat Goes On". Apple announced a new lineup of iPods, including the first generation iPod touch and third generation iPod nano. Custom ringtones, the discontinuation of the 4 GB model, and a price drop from $599 to $399 for the 8 GB model were also announced for the iPhone.

== 2008 ==
=== Macworld Conference & Expo San Francisco 2008 (January 16, 2008) ===
On January 16, 2008, at Moscone West in San Francisco, Jobs held a keynote where Apple’s first ultra-portable notebook, the MacBook Air, was introduced. In addition to that, the iTunes Store launched movie rentals available to play on computers and the Apple TV. Jim Gianopulos, the Chairman and CEO of 20th Century Fox, and Paul Otellini, the CEO of Intel, participated in the keynote as invited co-hosts.

Notable Information:

- Microsoft has begun shipping Microsoft Office for Mac 2008.
- Jobs introduced the Time Capsule, a wireless Time Machine back-up appliance and wireless access point.
- Jobs reports 4 million iPhones have sold in the 200 days they've been shipping.
- Gartner report for Q3 2007 shows iPhone #2 (19.5%) in US SmartPhone Marketshare, behind RIM (Blackberry) (39.0%).
- Jobs mentions the Software Developer Kit (SDK) for iPhone.
- Jobs spoke to new features in iPhone software release that was released day-of. iPod Touch to get new apps and software update for $20.
- Jobs introduced iTunes movie rentals. Launching with over 1000 movies. New movies available 30 days after DVD release. Rentals between $2.99 and $3.99.
- Jobs introduced an updated Apple TV "Take 2", a free software upgrade, that no longer required a computer. Price dropped from $299 to $229.
- Jobs introduced the MacBook Air - "the world's thinnest notebook". MacBook Air launched with an 80 GB HDD standard or an optional 64 GB SSD. MacBook Air will launch at $1799. Shipping starts 2 weeks from the keynote.
- Ad: MacBook Air "envelope" ad featuring New Soul by Yael Naïm.

=== iPhone Software Roadmap event (March 6, 2008) ===
Apple announced push technology in iPhone OS, the iPhone SDK and iPhoneOS 2.0.

=== WWDC 2008 (June 9–13, 2008) ===
Announcements at the keynote included the App Store for iPhone and iPod Touch, the stable version of the iPhone SDK, announced in March 2008, the iPhone 3G with worldwide 3G support, version 2.0 of iPhone OS, Mac OS X Snow Leopard (10.6), and the replacement/rebranding of .Mac as MobileMe.

=== Apple special event (September 9, 2008) ===
Updates on iTunes and music from Jobs, retirement of the larger form-factor iPod Classic with hard drive capacity increased on the remaining iPod Classic, and a new iPod Nano. At this event Jobs also joked "the reports of my death are greatly exaggerated".

=== Apple special event (October 14, 2008) ===
The Unibody Macbook Pro was announced.

A teaser for the event had the title "The spotlight turns to notebooks."

== 2009 ==
=== Macworld SF (January 6, 2009) ===
Phil Schiller presented the event. Steve Jobs was not at the event.

- Phil Schiller announced that the iTunes Store would start to sell DRM-free tracks.
- The 17-inch unibody Macbook Pro was announced.
- iLife '09 and iWork '09 were announced.

=== WWDC 2009 (June 8–12, 2009) ===
Announcements at the keynote included the release of the iPhone OS 3.0 software announced to developers in March, a demonstration of Mac OS X Snow Leopard (10.6), the new 13" MacBook Pro, updates to the 15" and 17" MacBook Pros, and the new iPhone 3GS.

=== Apple special event (September 9, 2009) ===
Announcements at the keynote included the release of iTunes 9, ability to purchase Ringtones for iPhone, iTunes LP, the 5th-generation iPod nano, 3rd-generation iPod touch, and a thinner 160GB 6th-generation iPod classic.

== 2010 ==
=== Apple special event (January 27, 2010) ===
The iPad was announced on January 27, 2010, by Steve Jobs at an Apple press conference at the Yerba Buena Center for the Arts in San Francisco.

Jobs later said that Apple began developing the iPad before the iPhone, but temporarily shelved the effort upon realizing that its ideas would work just as well in a mobile phone. The iPad's internal codename was K48, which was revealed in the court case surrounding leaking of iPad information before launch.

=== Apple special event (April 8, 2010) ===
Steve Jobs presented the event. Apple revealed iOS 4 (then known as iPhone OS 4). In Apple's description, it includes "over 100 new user features for iPhone and iPod Touch owners to enjoy. And for developers, a new software development kit (SDK) offers over 1500 new APIs to create apps that are even more powerful, innovative, and amazing."

=== WWDC 2010 (June 7–11, 2010) ===
On June 7, 2010, Jobs announced the iPhone 4. Also, iPhone OS was renamed to iOS. The FaceTime and iMovie app for iPhone applications were also announced.

=== Apple special event (September 1, 2010) ===
Steve Jobs announced a preview version of iOS 4.1, iOS 4.2, along with the 4th gen Shuffle, 6th gen Nano, 4th gen iPod Touch, iTunes 10 with Ping. and 2nd gen Apple TV.

=== Apple's 'Back to the Mac' event (October 20, 2010) ===
A preview of Mac OS X Lion was shown, featuring updated design elements that took inspiration from the iPad. Steve Jobs opened the event.

iLife '11 was announced, featuring updated versions iPhoto, iMovie, and Garageband. Gerhard Lengeling, Senior Director of Music Creation Applications at Apple helped to give a demo of the new version of Garageband. iLife '11 was announced to be free with every new Mac, and $49 for existing Macs.

Attention was given to FaceTime; Steve Jobs announced that Apple had shipped 19 million FaceTime-capable devices (iPod touches and iPhones) since June 2010, when FaceTime was first launched. FaceTime for the Mac was announced.

== 2011 ==
=== Apple special event (March 2, 2011) ===
Apple sent invitations to journalists on February 23, 2011, for a media event on March 2. Apple CEO Steve Jobs revealed the iPad 2 device at the Yerba Buena Center for the Arts on March 2, 2011, despite being on medical leave.

=== WWDC 2011 (June 6–10, 2011) ===
During the WWDC keynote, Apple announced the release of Mac OS X Lion the following July and iOS 5 in the fall of 2011, as well as the launch of the cloud service iCloud as a replacement for MobileMe, and the iTunes Match subscription.

Steve Jobs opened the event. Phil Schiller covered new features of Mac OS X Lion, such as new multi-touch gestures and a change in how full-screen applications could be handled. It was the last event to be held by Steve Jobs.

=== Apple special event (October 4, 2011) ===
On October 4, 2011, Apple held a media event in which it introduced Find My Friends and refreshed iPod Nano and iPod Touch models, and revealed the iPhone 4S with the Siri voice assistant as its key feature. The event was led by Tim Cook following Jobs’s resignation as CEO on August 24.

== 2012 ==
=== Apple special event (March 7, 2012) ===
On February 28, 2012, Apple announced a media event scheduled for March 7, 2012, at the Yerba Buena Center. Apple didn't disclose in advance what would be announced at the event, but it was widely expected to be a new version of the iPad. It was also rumored that Apple might release a new television set top box. The announcement affected the tablet resale market, and Apple's stock price reached a record closing figure on the same day that the Dow Jones Industrial Average reached a closing figure of above 13,000 for the first time since the 2008 financial crisis. (Apple is not a Dow Jones component.)

The keynote began 10 AM PST (18:00 UTC) with Cook introducing iOS 5.1, a Japanese version of Siri, and the 3rd generation Apple TV. The key announcement was the introduction of the third-generation iPad that featured a high-resolution Retina display and a marketing tagline “Resolutionary” as a wordplay. Eddy Cue gave a demo of the new Apple TV interface. At the media event, Cook talked about a 'post-PC world', a world where the personal computer is no longer the center of one's digital life, and of how the 3rd generation iPad will be one of the main contributors of the 'post-PC world'.

=== WWDC 2012 (June 11–15, 2012) ===
WWDC 2012 was held in Moscone Center West. The ticket price remained the same as the 2010 WWDC, selling at US$1,599. Apple changed the purchasing process by requiring purchases to be made using an Apple ID associated with a paid Apple developer account. Tickets went on sale shortly after 8:30 am Eastern Time on April 25, 2012, and were sold out within 1 hour and 43 minutes.

The keynote on June 11 highlighted the launch of Apple Maps, and also announced refreshed models of the MacBook Air and MacBook Pro, and the all-new 15-inch MacBook Pro with Retina Display. Apple also showcased OS X Mountain Lion (released in July 2012) and iOS 6 (released in September 2012).

This keynote was streamed live exclusively on iOS and OS X devices, through the Safari web browser.

=== Apple special event (September 12, 2012) ===
Phil Schiller, Apple's senior vice president of worldwide marketing, took the wraps off the new iPhone for press gathered at the company's San Francisco event, calling the device "the most beautiful product we've ever made, bar none." The iPhone 5 is made entirely of glass and aluminum, Schiller said, adding that the "exacting level of standards" exhibited by the phone is Apple's best hardware engineering to date.

It's the thinnest and lightest iPhone, at 7.6mm thin, and 112 grams. Schiller said those measurements make it the world's thinnest smartphone. The iPhone 5 was also volumetrically smaller than the previous model, the iPhone 4S.

=== Apple special event (October 23, 2012) ===
On October 23, 2012, Apple CEO Tim Cook unveiled the new iPad Mini, fourth generation iPad with Retina display, new iMac, and the 13-inch MacBook Pro with Retina display.

== 2013 ==
=== WWDC 2013 (June 10–14, 2013) ===
WWDC 2013 was held at Moscone West in San Francisco – the same venue as in previous years. Tickets went on sale at 10 am PDT on April 25, 2013, selling out within 71 seconds (1 minute and 11 seconds). Apple also announced that it will award 150 free WWDC 2013 Student Scholarship tickets to those who want to attend in order to benefit from the conference's many workshops, with applications for a scholarship starting 9am PDT on April 29, 2013, and deadline slated for 5pm PDT on May 2, 2013. Winning applicants were notified by May 16, 2013, though Apple states that it won't reimburse winners for travel or hotel expenses. In the keynote, Apple unveiled a redesigned model of the Mac Pro, AirPort Time Capsule, and AirPort Extreme as well as updated models of the MacBook Air. Apple also showcased OS X Mavericks, iOS 7, iWork for iCloud and a new music streaming service named iTunes Radio. Vampire Weekend performed at the Bash on June 13 at the Yerba Buena Gardens.

This keynote was streamed live on June 10, 2013.

=== Apple special event (September 10, 2013) ===
Apple announced the iPhone 5C and iPhone 5S during a media event called "This should brighten everyone's day." at its Cupertino headquarters on September 10, 2013. While the iPhone 5C became available for preorder on September 13, 2013, the iPhone 5S first became available on September 20, 2013. While most of the promotion focused on Touch ID, the 64-bit Apple A7 was also a highlight during the event:

"This is the first-ever 64-bit processor in a phone of any kind. I don't think the other guys are even talking about it yet. Why go through all this? The benefits are huge. The A7 is up to twice as fast as the previous-generation system at CPU tasks, and up to twice as fast at graphics tasks, too."

— Phil Schiller, Apple keynote at 4 Infinite Loop on September 10, 2013

Schiller then showed demos of Infinity Blade III to demonstrate the A7's processing power and the iPhone 5S camera using unretouched photographs. The release of iOS 7 on September 18, 2013, was also announced during the keynote.

=== Apple special event (October 22, 2013) ===
Apple held a second Fall event in 2013 under the name of "We still have a lot to cover." This event saw the unveiling of the iPad Air, the second-generation iPad mini with Retina display, and updates to the MacBook Pro line. Tim Cook also announced that OS X Mavericks would be available for free.

== 2014 ==
=== WWDC 2014 (June 2–6, 2014) ===
At Moscone West, Apple presented the new version of its operating systems: OS X Yosemite and iOS 8, both scheduled for release in the fall.

As a “one more thing” specifically for developers, Apple announced the new programming language Swift, meant to interoperate with and eventually replace Objective-C on all Apple platforms.

This keynote was streamed live on June 2, 2014.

=== Apple special event (September 9, 2014) ===
Presented on the "Wish we could say more" event was the most anticipated iPhone 6 and 6 Plus as well as the contactless payment system Apple Pay. The Apple Watch, the company's first smartwatch, was introduced, months before its release in April 2015. The event took place at Flint Center in Cupertino.

=== Apple special event (October 16, 2014) ===
Apple's "It's been way too long" media event took place on October 16, 2014. The company used this event to unveil the iPad Air 2, iPad mini 3, and an updated 27-inch model of the iMac featuring a 5K Retina display.

This keynote was streamed live on October 16, 2014.

== 2015 ==
=== Apple special event (March 9, 2015) ===
Apple Special Event 2015 had the tagline "Spring Forward" and was broadcast live from Cupertino on Apple's website on March 9, 2015. It announced the release date and pricing for the anticipated Apple Watch, the MacBook's fourth redesign and iOS 8.2's same day release. Apple also announced ResearchKit, a library designed to enable researchers to make study applications where participants can download them on their phones, electronic enroll & consent, and send survey and sensor data. Five launch studies were introduced, including My Heart Counts, which enrolled over 11,000 participants in a single day.

=== WWDC 2015 (June 8–12, 2015) ===
WWDC 2015 was held in Moscone Center West in San Francisco. The major announcements were the new features of iOS 9, the next version of OS X called OS X El Capitan, the first major software update to the Apple Watch, the June 30 debut of Apple Music, and news that the programming language Swift was becoming open-source software supporting iOS, OS X, and Linux. The Beer Bash was held at the Yerba Buena Gardens on June 11. Walk the Moon performed there.

This keynote was streamed live on June 8, 2015.

=== Apple special event (September 9, 2015) ===
The "Hey Siri, give us a hint" event was held at the 7,000-seat Bill Graham Civic Auditorium in San Francisco. Apple announced and previewed watchOS 2 with native apps; the long-anticipated Apple TV update - with App Store, Siri Remote and tvOS; iPhone 6S and iPhone 6S Plus with the Apple A9, 3D Touch, 12MP camera; iOS 9 update coming September 16; and iPad Mini 4 together with iPad Pro with 12.9" Retina display, optional keyboard/cover, and the Apple Pencil stylus. OneRepublic performed at the event.

This keynote was streamed live on September 9, 2015. For the first time, Windows users were able to watch it live using Microsoft Edge, the native Windows 10 browser.

== 2016 ==
=== Apple special event (March 21, 2016) ===
Apple invited the press media for its event "Let us loop you in" on March 21, 2016, in their own theatre "Town Hall" (at 1 Infinite Loop). iPad Pro (9.7-inch), the first-generation iPhone SE, CareKit and updates to Apple Watch, HealthKit, ResearchKit and tvOS were released.

=== WWDC 2016 (June 13–17, 2016) ===
Apple invited the press media and developers for its event on June 13, 2016, at Moscone West to unveil new versions of iOS, watchOS, tvOS, and macOS, a revamped Apple Music design, and the Swift Playgrounds app - a learning tool for programming.

This keynote was streamed live on June 13, 2016.

=== Apple special event (September 7, 2016) ===
Apple hosted a media event on September 7, 2016, with the invitation's tagline "See you on the 7th". iPhone 7 and 7 Plus were announced at the event along with Apple's new wireless AirPods. iOS 10, watchOS 3 and tvOS 10 were released six days later. Sia performed at the event.

=== Apple special event (October 27, 2016) ===
Apple hosted another media event on October 27, 2016, with the tagline "hello again". A new generation of MacBook Pro and a new TV app was announced at the event.

== 2017 ==
=== WWDC 2017 (June 5–9, 2017) ===
WWDC 2017 was held in San Jose, California, at its Convention Center. There were multiple hardware announcements at the event. Software announcements included iOS 11, watchOS 4, tvOS 11 and macOS High Sierra. An all-new second generation iPad Pro model was introduced with thinner bezels and a 10.5-inch screen size. It acquired many of the specs from the iPhone 7 and an A10X chip. The iPad Pro 12.9-inch was also refreshed with updated internals. Apple previewed several new Mac models, such as the MacBook, MacBook Pro, iMac, and an all-new iMac Pro and all-new HomePod.

=== Apple special event (September 12, 2017) ===
Apple hosted a media event on September 12, 2017, with the tagline "Let's meet at our place". The tagline was a reference to Apple holding its first-ever event at the newly completed Steve Jobs Theater in the Apple Park campus. At the event, Apple Watch Series 3, Apple TV 4K, iPhone 8 and 8 Plus, and iPhone X were announced at the event. iOS 11, watchOS 4 and tvOS 11 were released a week later.

== 2018 ==
=== Apple special event (March 27, 2018) ===
Apple hosted a media event on March 27, 2018, with the tagline "Let's take a field trip". It was held at the Lane Technical College Prep High School in Chicago. The iPad (6th generation) was announced at the education-focused event.

=== WWDC 2018 (June 4–8, 2018) ===
WWDC 2018 was held at the San Jose Convention Center in California. The announcements at the event included iOS 12, macOS Mojave, watchOS 5, and tvOS 12. Panic! at the Disco performed at the Bash at Discovery Meadow Park.

=== Apple special event (September 12, 2018) ===
Apple hosted another media event on September 12, 2018, with the tagline "Gather round". It was held at the Steve Jobs Theater in the Apple Park campus. The Apple Watch Series 4, the iPhone XS and XS Max, and the iPhone XR were announced at the event. iOS 12, watchOS 5 and tvOS 12 were released five days later.

=== Apple special event (October 30, 2018) ===
Apple hosted another media event on October 30, 2018, with the tagline "There's more in the making". It was held at the Brooklyn Academy of Music in Brooklyn, New York City. The new MacBook Air 2018 model, Mac Mini 2018 model, and the 11-inch and 12.9-inch third generation iPad Pro were announced at the event.

The event closed with a live performance of Lana Del Rey singing How to Disappear and an edited version of Venice Bitch from her upcoming album Norman Fucking Rockwell!

== 2019 ==
=== Apple special event (March 25, 2019) ===
Apple hosted a media event on March 25, 2019, with the tagline "It's show time". It was held at the Steve Jobs Theater in the Apple Park campus. Apple News+, Apple Card, Apple Arcade and Apple TV+ were announced at this event.

=== WWDC 2019 (June 3–7, 2019) ===
WWDC 2019 was held at the San Jose Convention Center in California. At the keynote that kicked off the event, Apple announced iOS 13, iPadOS, macOS Catalina, tvOS 13, watchOS 6, a redesigned Mac Pro, the Pro Display XDR, and the new SwiftUI framework.

WWDC19 hosted over 5,500 attendees, including 350 winners of Apple's student challenge. For the latter, a separate "Scholarship Kickoff" event was organized on June 2, one day before the conference start.

Weezer performed at the "Bash" meetup organized as part of WWDC at Discovery Meadow (located about half a kilometer from the convention center).

=== Apple special event (September 10, 2019) ===
Apple hosted a special event on September 10, 2019, with the tagline “By innovation only.” It was held at the Steve Jobs Theater in the Apple Park campus. Apple TV+ updates, Apple Watch Series 5, iPhone 11, iPhone 11 Pro and 11 Pro Max, and the iPad (7th generation) were announced at the event. iOS 13 and watchOS 6 were released nine days later. iPadOS and tvOS 13 were also released the following five days.

The event was streamed live on YouTube for the first time, in addition to the usual streaming on Apple's website and through an Apple TV channel.

== 2020 ==
=== WWDC 2020 (June 22–26, 2020) ===
Due to the COVID-19 pandemic, WWDC 2020 took place as a virtual conference for the first time, and the headline keynote event was pre-recorded (also for the first time). The announcements on June 22 included iOS 14, iPadOS 14, watchOS 7, tvOS 14, macOS Big Sur and the Mac transition to Apple silicon. The keynote was recorded at Apple Park in Cupertino, California.

=== Apple event (September 15, 2020) ===
An Apple Event was held on September 15, 2020, with the tagline "Time flies." It took place as a virtual event, pre-recorded at Apple Park. Amongst the many announcements include the Apple Watch Series 6, the Apple Watch SE, the fourth-generation iPad Air, and the iPad (8th generation). iOS 14, iPadOS 14, watchOS 7 and tvOS 14 were released a day later.

=== Apple event (October 13, 2020) ===
An Apple Event was held on October 13, 2020, with the tagline "Hi, Speed" referring to the support of the 5G cellular standard. It also took place as a virtual event at Apple Park, just like the previous one held on September 15. The HomePod mini, iPhone 12 mini, iPhone 12, iPhone 12 Pro, and iPhone 12 Pro Max were announced at the event. Preorders for iPhone 12 and iPhone 12 Pro began on October 16 and shipping began on October 23. The iPhone 12 mini and iPhone 12 Pro Max were available for preorder on November 6, and started shipping on November 13. Verizon CEO Hans Vestberg appeared alongside Tim Cook to discuss 5G.

=== Apple event (November 10, 2020) ===
An Apple Event was held on November 10, 2020, with the tagline "One more thing.", a reference to the iconic phrase used by Steve Jobs to introduce products during his keynote speeches. It also took place as a virtual event at Apple Park, just like the previous two held on September 15 and October 13. It focused on the Apple M1, the new Apple silicon chip, and the new Apple silicon-powered models of the MacBook Air, Mac mini, and 13" MacBook Pro. macOS Big Sur was released two days later. John Hodgman appeared in a cameo at the end of the event, reprising his character of a Windows PC from Apple's "Get a Mac" advertising campaign.

== 2021 ==
=== Apple event (April 20, 2021) ===
An Apple Event was held on April 20, 2021, with the tagline "Spring loaded." It took place as a virtual event at Apple Park. It revealed a new iPad Pro and iMac with the Apple M1 chip, Apple TV 4K, AirTag, and a new purple color option for iPhone 12 and 12 Mini, and announced new features for iOS 14.5.

=== WWDC 2021 (June 7–11, 2021) ===
As with the previous WWDC in 2020, WWDC 2021 took place as a virtual event, with its keynote pre-recorded at Apple Park. The announcements at the online special event keynote on June 7 included iOS 15, iPadOS 15, watchOS 8, tvOS 15 and macOS Monterey.

=== Apple event (September 14, 2021) ===
An Apple Event was held on September 14, 2021, with the tagline "California streaming." It also took place as a virtual event at Apple Park and at locations across California. During the event, it revealed the iPad (9th generation) with the Apple A13 chip, the new iPad mini with the Apple A15 chip, the Apple Watch Series 7, and the iPhone 13 mini, iPhone 13, iPhone 13 Pro, and iPhone 13 Pro Max. iOS 15, iPadOS 15, watchOS 8, and tvOS 15 were released six days later. Pre-orders for iPhone 13, iPhone 13 mini, iPhone 13 Pro, and iPhone 13 Pro Max began on September 17 and shipping began on September 24.

=== Apple event (October 18, 2021) ===
An Apple Event was held on October 18, 2021, with the tagline "Unleashed." It again took place as a virtual event and was livestreamed from Apple Park. During the event, Apple announced an Apple Music Voice Plan, new color options for HomePod mini (blue, yellow, and orange, which became available in November), AirPods (3rd generation), and new MacBook Pro 14" and 16". macOS Monterey was released a week later. The new MacBook models have a new design, bringing back previously removed ports, and are powered by Apple's M1 Pro and M1 Max processors, which replaced the Intel processors in the previous 16" model.

== 2022 ==
=== Apple event (March 8, 2022) ===
An Apple Event was held on March 8, 2022, with the tagline "Peek performance." It was once again held as a virtual event. A new iPhone SE with 5G capabilities and an enhanced camera was announced, as well as new "Green/Alpine Green" color options for the iPhone 13 and iPhone 13 Pro. A new iPad Air with the M1 chip and 5G was also announced at the event. A new desktop computer, the Mac Studio, was also announced, along with the M1 Ultra chip and the new Apple Studio Display, Apple's first consumer-grade monitor since the discontinuation of the Apple Thunderbolt Display in 2016.

=== WWDC 2022 (June 6–10, 2022) ===
WWDC 2022 took place as a virtual event, although there was a special day at Apple Park on June 6, allowing developers and students to watch the online events together. Software announcements at the online special event keynote on June 6 included iOS 16, iPadOS 16, watchOS 9, tvOS 16 and macOS Ventura. Hardware announcements included the M2 chip and two Macs based on it, a redesigned MacBook Air and an updated 13-inch MacBook Pro.

After two years of online only events due to the COVID-19 pandemic, WWDC 2022 was the first in-person Apple Event since WWDC 2019. The opening keynote was still pre-recorded, with a limited number of developers and members of the press invited to Apple Park. The viewing occurred at Caffè Macs inside Apple Park, with seating extending outside.

=== Apple event (September 7, 2022) ===
An Apple Event was held on September 7, 2022, with the tagline "Far out." It took place as an in-person event at the Steve Jobs Theater at 10 a.m. PDT. It also took place as a virtual event at Apple Park and at locations across California, just like the previous one held on March 8. Apple announced the Apple Watch Series 8, the second-generation Apple Watch SE, the new Apple Watch Ultra, the second-generation AirPods Pro, the iPhone 14 and iPhone 14 Plus with the Apple A15 chip, and the iPhone 14 Pro and iPhone 14 Pro Max with the Apple A16 chip.

== 2023 ==
=== WWDC 2023 (June 5–9, 2023) ===
WWDC 2023 took place online with an in-person experience at Apple Park. Hardware announcements at the online special event keynote on June 5 included the 15-inch MacBook Air, the next-generation Mac Studio with dual chips M2 Max and M2 Ultra, a newly upgraded Mac Pro with an M2 Ultra chip, and Apple Vision Pro, a new augmented reality headset with an Apple M2 chip and an Apple R1 chip. Software announcements also included iOS 17, iPadOS 17, macOS Sonoma, watchOS 10, tvOS 17, and the visionOS operating system for the Apple Vision Pro.

=== Apple event (September 12, 2023) ===
An Apple event was held on September 12, 2023, with the tagline "Wonderlust." It took place online with an in-person experience at Apple Park on September 12, 2023, at 10 a.m. PT. Apple announced Apple Watch Series 9, Apple Watch Series Ultra 2, iPhone 15, iPhone 15 Plus, iPhone 15 Pro, and iPhone 15 Pro Max. The entire iPhone 15 lineup switched to USB-C, replacing the Lightning port (originally introduced in 2012), to comply with the Radio Equipment Directive (2022) from the European Parliament. iOS 17, iPadOS 17, watchOS 10 and tvOS 17 were released six days later, on September 18.

=== Apple event (October 30, 2023) ===
An Apple event was held on October 30, 2023, with the tagline "Scary fast.", at 5 p.m. Pacific Standard Time, making it Apple's first nighttime event. It introduced MacBook Pro models and an iMac with Apple M3 family chips. It was Apple's first digital event to be shot on iPhone and edited on Mac.

== 2024 ==
=== Apple event (May 7, 2024) ===
An Apple event was held on May 7, 2024 at 7:00 am Pacific Standard Time with the tagline "Let loose." The event focused mainly on iPads, including the introduction of the iPad Pro (7th generation) with the new M4 chip, the iPad Air (6th generation), Magic Keyboard 2 and Apple Pencil Pro.

=== WWDC 2024 (June 10–14, 2024) ===
WWDC 2024 took place online with an in-person experience at Apple Park. Apple announced iOS 18, iPadOS 18, watchOS 11, tvOS 18, visionOS 2, and macOS Sequoia. All operating systems except tvOS featured Apple Intelligence, Apple’s set of artificial-intelligence apps and services, though some of them (such as the “more personalized” Siri) were later delayed or canceled, leading to a federal lawsuit for false advertising and fraud.

=== Apple event (September 9, 2024) ===
An Apple event was held on September 9 at 10:00 am Pacific Time with the tagline "It's Glowtime." Apple unveiled the iPhone 16 with the A18 chip, the iPhone 16 Pro with the A18 Pro chip, AirPods 4, Apple Watch Series 10 and other products at their event.

== 2025 ==
=== WWDC 2025 (June 9–13, 2025) ===
WWDC 2025 took place online with an in-person experience at Apple Park. Apple announced iOS 26, iPadOS 26, macOS 26 Tahoe, watchOS 26, tvOS 26, and visionOS 26, all featuring a redesign of their user interface, titled Liquid Glass. With these updates, Apple switched to a unified naming scheme, using the number of the upcoming year.

=== Apple event (September 9, 2025) ===
An Apple event was held on September 9 at 10:00 am Pacific Time with the tagline "Awe dropping." The event introduced the iPhone 17, iPhone 17 Pro and Pro Max as well as a thinner iPhone Air, all with a new A19 series of chips. Apple also introduced an Apple Watch Series 11 alongside a third-generation Apple Watch SE and Apple Watch Ultra, as well as third-generation AirPods Pro.

== 2026 ==
=== WWDC 2026 (June 8–12, 2026) ===
WWDC 2026 took place online with an in-person experience at Apple Park. The keynote took place at 10:00 am Pacific Time with the tagline "All systems glow". It introduced macOS 27 Golden Gate, iOS 27, iPadOS 27, watchOS 27, tvOS 27, and visionOS 27. It also featured updates for Apple Intelligence, including an LLM-powered version of Siri named Siri AI, and the child safety set of tools for parental controls. This was the last event to be hosted by Tim Cook as CEO.

The keynote was followed by a number of prerecorded engineering, design, and other sessions published on the Apple Developer portal and YouTube on the first day of the conference. The schedule also included live-streamed “group labs” with panels of hosts who discussed the topic and answered pre-moderated questions from the audience.

=== Apple event (September 9, 2026) ===
An Apple event was held on September 9 at 10:00 am Pacific Time with the tagline "Surprise and shine". The event introduced the iPhone Duo and the iPhone 18 Pro and Pro Max, all with a new A20 Pro system-on-a-chip and the Apple-designed C2 wireless chip. The company also introduced Apple Watch Series 12 and Ultra 4, as well as AirPods 5. It was the first event to be hosted by John Ternus as CEO.

== See also ==
- Apple Inc. advertising
- Apple Worldwide Developers Conference
- Macworld/iWorld
- Stevenote
