= Tutor Perini =

American construction company (founded 1894)

Coordinates: 34.312322°N 118.477379°W

Tutor Perini Corporation
- Formerly: Perini Corporation
- Type: Public
- Traded as: NYSE: TPC; Russell 2000 Component
- Industry: construction
- Founded: 1894 as Perini Corporation 1949 as A.G. Tutor Company
- Founder: Albert Garrow Tutor
- Headquarters: Sylmar, California, United States
- Key people: Gary Smalley (CEO)
- Revenue: ▲US$5.54 billion (2025)
- Net income: ▲US$80.44 million (2025)
- Total assets: ▲US$5.16 billion (2026)
- Owner: Ronald Tutor (12.6%)
- Number of employees: ~7,400 (2025)
- Website: www.tutorperini.com

Tutor Perini Corporation (formerly Perini Corporation) is one of the largest general contractors in the United States. It was formed by the merger of Perini Corporation and Tutor-Saliba Corporation in 2008. As of 2025, it reported annual revenue of approximately $5.54 billion. Tutor Perini is headquartered in Sylmar, California, and works on construction projects throughout North America and certain overseas and international locations including Guam and the Indo-Pacific Region. Specific areas of focus are civil infrastructure such as bridges, highways, tunnels, airports, and mass transit systems, building infrastructure (healthcare, education, municipal government, detention facilities, hospitality and gaming, multi-use, office towers, multi-unit residential towers, high-technology projects), and specialty contracting (electrical, mechanical, plumbing, heating, air conditioning and ventilation (HVAC), and fire protection systems).

== History ==
=== A.G. Tutor Company, Inc ===
In 1949, Albert G. Tutor launched a family construction business, A.G. Tutor Company, Inc. His son Ronald joined the company in 1963, and the company expanded under his leadership. In 1972, the company partnered with N.M. Saliba. In 1981, Ron Tutor took the reins as president of the Tutor-Saliba Corporation.

=== Perini Corporation ===
Perini Corporation was founded in 1894 in Ashland, Massachusetts by a stonemason named Bonfiglio Perini. The company grew to become one of the region's most recognized heavy construction contractors. From 1931 to 2009, Perini was headquartered in Framingham, Massachusetts.

Under the direction of Bonfiglio's grandson, Lou Perini, the company moved into the real-estate business, developing|4500 acres in Palm Beach County, Florida. Later real-estate ventures were less successful, leaving Perini deeply in debt by the mid-1990s.

=== Tutor Perini Corporation ===
In 1997, Ron Tutor helped Perini Corp. recapitalize alongside investor Richard Blum. Tutor became CEO of Perini in 2000 and merged Perini with Tutor-Saliba in 2008 in a transaction valued at $862 million.

Perini was originally listed OTC on June 15, 1961, then subsequently listed on AMEX on May 12, 1970, then listed on the NYSE on April 1, 2004. It was headquartered in Framingham, Massachusetts until relocating to Sylmar, California in 2009.

In May 2009, Perini shareholders voted to change the company's name to Tutor Perini Corporation.

== Acquisitions ==
- In 2003, Perini acquired Florida-based James A. Cummings Inc.
- In 2005, the company acquired Cherry Hill Construction, a Maryland-based contractor, and California-based Rudolph & Sletten, Inc.
- January 2008, Perini acquired Desert Heating and Cooling (later renamed Desert Mechanical), a southwestern U.S. mechanical contractor
- In 2009, Perini acquired Black Construction, based in Guam.
- In January 2009, the corporation acquired Philadelphia-based building contractor Keating Building Corporation.
- November 1, 2010 - Superior Gunite, a structural concrete firm headquartered in Lakeview Terrace, California.
- January 3, 2011 – Fisk Electric, a provider of electrical and technological services headquartered in Houston.
- April 4, 2011 – Anderson Companies, a general contractor headquartered in Gulfport, Mississippi.
- June 1, 2011 – Frontier-Kemper Constructors, a provider of numerous construction services including civil construction, mine development, drilling, tunneling, and electrical services headquartered in Evansville, Indiana.
- July 1, 2011 – Lunda Construction Company, provider of various construction services such as the construction, rehabilitation, and maintenance of bridges, railroads, and other civil structures headquartered in Black River Falls, Wisconsin.
- July 1, 2011 – GreenStar Services Corporation, an electrical and mechanical services provider that is composed of three operating entities: Five Star Electric Corporation, WDF, and Nagelbush.
- August 18, 2011 – Becho, Inc., a specialty construction company incorporated in 1979.

== Notable projects ==
Name	Image	Description
Southwest METRO Green Line Extension Minnesota, USA		Tutor Perini subsidiaries Lunda Construction and Becho, Inc. were contracted on the Minnesota Southwest METRO Green Line Extension project, initially bid in 2018. It includes 14.5 miles of twin-track light rail, 16 stations, 29 new bridges, 2 tunnels, and the relocation of 5 miles of freight track. The new line will connect several rail lines and is the largest public works project in Minnesota history, with an estimated value of approximately $1.25 billion. The project is scheduled for completion in 2026.
Hudson Yards Manhattan, New York City, USA	Under construction in 2017	In 2016 the company was awarded contracts worth roughly $1.2 billion for the construction of Tower D and The Shops & Restaurants retail complex at the development.
Borough Based Jails Program - Manhattan Jail Manhattan, New York City, USA		Tutor Perini was selected for design-build of the Manhattan Facility Project, a correctional facility at 125 White Street, the site of the former Manhattan Detention Complex. Together, the borough-based jails operated by the New York City Department of Correction will replace Rikers Island. It will provide 1,040 custodial beds on 80,000 square feet, with underground parking for corrections staff. An additional 20,000 square feet will serve community and commercial needs. The total contract award is roughly $3.76 billion; it is estimated to be completed in 2036.
Borough Based Jails Program - Brooklyn Jail Brooklyn, New York City, USA		Tutor Perini was also selected to provide design-build services for a corrections facility at 275 Atlantic Avenue, the site of the former Brooklyn Detention Complex. The new facility will provide 1,040 beds for persons in custody, on a total of 59,900 square feet, with underground parking for corrections staff. The estimated contract award is $2.95 billion for completion in 2029. It was topped out in early 2026.
California High-Speed Rail Central California, USA	San Joaquin River Viaduct in 2019 Completed in February 2021	The California High-Speed Rail Authority's Construction Package 1, a $1.9 billion contract, was the first significant construction contract executed on the Initial Operating Section of the high-speed rail project in California's Central Valley. The CP1 construction area is a 32-mile stretch between Avenue 19 in Madera County to East American Avenue in Fresno County, including major work elements in downtown Fresno. It includes 12 roadway / railroad grade separations, 2 mainline viaducts, 1 tunnel, realignments of existing railroad tracks, utility relocations, roadway relocations, 2 trench sections, and a major river crossing over the San Joaquin River.
Terminal 3 – Harry Reid International Airport Las Vegas, Nevada, USA		The 14-gate Terminal 3 at Las Vegas' Harry Reid International Airport includes a new terminal building with an elevated roadway structure fronting the facility, over-roadway pedestrian bridges, underground automated transit system infrastructure, and an aircraft ramp. The terminal has its own retail concessions, parking and ticketing. The new 1,900,000-square-foot terminal building includes a basement, three upper levels and roof-level penthouses. The building houses a baggage handling system for outbound and inbound processing, and an in-line explosives detection system for baggage screening. The building's infrastructure is designed with extensive cabling for software interfaces. Other features include dynamic and static signage, way finding systems and Voice-over-Internet Protocol (VoIP). The elevated roadway extends the length of the terminal – approximately 90-foot wide and 2,000-foot long. Construction of the elevated roadway includes a concrete box girder with cast concrete columns.
Embassy housing and infrastructure Baghdad, Iraq		Perini Management Services led a design-build team for construction of a housing compound at the Baghdad Embassy that included 11 two-story hardened barracks buildings (273,000 square feet), warehouse (39,000 square feet), guard booths and entry control points, and all associated infrastructure. Work was performed within a tight footprint, and included a site topographic survey, subsurface and geotechnical investigation, a hydrogeological study for the water well design, demolition of existing buildings, site excavation, and grading. The project was awarded under a multiple award task order contract for design-build services within the Central Command Area of Operations. Perini successfully completed $850 million worth of design-build task orders under the base contract.
Cosmopolitan Hotel Las Vegas, Nevada, USA	The Boulevard (left) and Chelsea towers	As a mixed-use, urban high-rise development, on approximately 8.5 acres, the project includes over 6,000,000 square feet of development. This resort and casino features two 52-story hotel towers containing approximately 3,000 luxury rooms and suites; over 150,000 square feet of convention and conference space; a 75,000-square-foot casino; 300,000 square feet of retail boutiques and restaurants; an 1,800-seat theater; a 500-seat cabaret; a 50,000-square-foot spa, salon and fitness center; multiple nightclub venues; and a 3,800-car underground parking structure. The five-level, below-grade parking structure required one of the largest excavations in the history of Las Vegas. Over one million cubic yards of dirt was removed from the site to create a 90-foot-deep opening to begin construction.
Purple Line (D Line) Extension Project, Sections 2 & 3 Los Angeles, California, USA		Tutor Perini is building on two sections and four stations on the Purple Line Extension: Wilshire/Rodeo, Century City/Constellation, Westwood/UCLA, and Westwood/VA Hospital. Tutor Perini is also the Design-Build Contractor for the Purple Line Extension Section 3 Tunnels contract which will add 2.56 miles of new rail to the Purple Line. The Westwood/UCLA station will be located under Wilshire Boulevard between Veteran Avenue and Westwood Boulevard. The Westwood/VA Hospital station, including two crossovers, will be located to the west of the I‐405 Freeway and south of Wilshire Boulevard and will include a pedestrian bridge to the south of Wilshire. Both stations will be constructed of cast-in-place concrete in a subterranean environment in the middle of major urban shopping districts and commercial city streets. Tutor Perini will design not only the major support-of-excavation (SOE) down to a depth of up to 100 vertical feet below street level but also temporary traffic decking system to carry vehicular traffic over the stations box cavities during stations construction. From the current terminus at Wilshire/Western, the Purple Line Extension will extend westward for about 9 miles with seven new stations. It will provide a high-capacity, high-speed, dependable alternative for those traveling to and from LA's “second downtown.” Section 2 of the three sections will deliver 2.55 miles of twin-bored tunnels and two new stations at Wilshire/Rodeo and Century City Constellation. In January 2017, phase two of the project, which will extend trackage 2.6 miles (4.2 km) further to Century City, was awarded a $1.6 billion grant from the Federal Transit Administration, covering the majority of the $2.6 billion estimated cost of the project. On January 27, the Metro board awarded a $1.37 billion construction contract to a joint venture between Tutor Perini Corporation and O&G Industries, with construction scheduled to be completed by 2025.
Airport Expansion – John F. Kennedy International Airport Queens, New York City, USA		This project includes the rehabilitation and extension of runway 4L-22R. The existing asphalt runway was milled six inches deep and topped with a two-inch asphalt leveling course. The runway was then overlaid with 18 inches of Portland Cement Concrete Pavement (228,000 cubic yards). The runway was widened by 50 feet and extended by 700 feet. The finished product was a 12,700-foot long by 200-foot-wide new runway with 40-foot-wide shoulders that handles about 25 percent of the annual operations of the airport.
Ronald Reagan Building and International Trade Center Washington D.C., USA		The complex is the second largest federal building constructed since the Pentagon and offers a mix of office space, cultural, commercial, entertainment and educational space.
Terminal One – Newark Liberty International Airport Newark, New Jersey, USA		The Terminal One project at Newark Liberty International Airport involves the design and construction of a new 1 million-square-foot, 33-gate domestic terminal with an open and modern layout. This Tutor Perini/Parsons Design-Build project also includes the N60 Frontage Road Bridge and a pedestrian bridge with moving walkways. In addition, the scope of work involves site clearing, an underground hydrant fueling system, the abatement and demolition of multiple buildings, structures, pavement, and utilities.
Lincoln Financial Field / Philadelphia Eagles Philadelphia, Pennsylvania, USA		Lincoln Financial Field is a concrete and steel structure, with a red brick headhouse at the main entrance. It accommodates 69,000 spectators and encompasses approximately 1,600,000 sf of floor space.
SR 99 – Alaska Way Viaduct Replacement Tunnel Seattle, Washington, USA		The SR 99 Alaskan Way Viaduct is being replaced with an approximately two-mile-long double-deck tunnel underneath downtown Seattle. Replacing the viaduct with a tunnel allows the highway to remain open for much of construction, thus minimizing closures and impacts to traffic. Once the tunnel opens, the viaduct will be taken down to clear the way for new public space along Seattle's downtown waterfront. Seattle Tunnel Partners, is responsible for designing and building the SR 99 tunnel. In addition to boring the tunnel and building the highway within it, STP is responsible for building highway ramps and other connections at the north and south ends of the tunnel. They are also constructing buildings at each tunnel portal to house lighting, ventilation and other systems needed to operate the tunnel.
Hurricane Katrina repairs Mississippi, Louisiana, & Florida Gulf Coast		Tutor Perini subsidiary Roy Anderson Corp performed $783 million of reconstruction work in the first 24 months following Hurricane Katrina, operating under FEMA regulations and contracting with various state and municipal agencies. Work consisted of debris removal, residential construction, and commercial construction. Roy Anderson assisted with the debris removal and disposal for the City of Gulfport, Mississippi. This contract consisted of the removal and disposal of approximately 4,000,000 cubic yards of storm debris.
Encore at Wynn Las Vegas, Nevada, USA		Encore was constructed on approximately 20 acres on the Las Vegas Strip, immediately adjacent to the flagship property of Wynn Las Vegas. It includes a glass tower exceeding 653 feet in height with 2,034 all-suite hotel rooms, ranging from 700 square feet to 5,800 square feet. It also includes a 72,000-square-foot casino, 60,000 square feet of additional convention and meeting space, restaurants, a nightclub, swimming pools, cabanas, a spa and salon, retail outlets, 1,095,000 square feet above-grade parking, and an additional 315,000 square feet of underground parking. The project consists of a tower frame of reinforced concrete and an exterior skin of a glass curtain wall system to match the current tower on the Wynn property. The low-rise consists of structural steel frame with a composite glass, EIFS and stone exterior enclosure.
BART San Francisco Airport Extension San Francisco, California, USA		This design-build project expanded the San Francisco Bay Area Rapid Transit District (BART) system 8 miles into San Mateo County from the existing Colma City station to the San Francisco International Airport (SFO) and terminating at the new Millbrae station. The project route required that the northern portion of the line be placed underground using a cut-and-cover approach. The southern half of the alignment ran parallel to the Caltrain Corridor, which remained in active service throughout construction for freight and passenger traffic. Service to the airport was created by raising the BART line onto an elevated section that crossed the Caltrain Corridor and a sensitive wetlands area then connected to a Caltrans crossing of the US Highway 101, where it ties into an elevated station at the airport that is integrated with the airport people mover syxstem (also built by Tutor Perini Corporation for SFO).
Gaylord National Hotel Oxon Hill, Maryland, USA		A 2,400,000-square-foot, 2,000-room, 20-story hotel, 800,000 square feet of convention and meeting space, 20,000-square-foot luxury spa and fitness center and 1,950-car parking garage. With 470,000 square feet of flexible meeting space, exhibition space, pre-function space and convention space, Gaylord National is the largest combined hotel and convention center on the Eastern seaboard.
Third Street Light Rail – Phase 2 San Francisco, California, USA		The Central Subway, Third Street Light Rail – Phase 2 Project, extends the existing SFMTA Light Rail System T-Line service from Fourth and King Streets, north along and under Fourth Street to Market Street, under the BART and Muni Metro tunnels adjacent to Powell Station, and then north along and under Stockton Street to Chinatown Station. The Work includes construction of three underground stations at Chinatown, Union Square/Market Street and Yerba Buena/Moscone areas with one surface station at Fourth and Brannan Street in addition to the construction of the systems and track through the tunnels and in the stations. When the Central Subway was completed, Third Line trains will travel mostly underground from the 4th Street Caltrain Station to Chinatown, bypassing heavy traffic on congested 4th Street and Stockton Street.
Palace Tower of Caesars Palace Hotel & Casino Las Vegas, Nevada, USA		The 29-story, 2,100,000-square-foot Palace Tower is a Roman-themed facility containing 1,134 guest rooms and suites. The tower is supported by five levels of low-rise that feature 89,000 square feet of ballroom/meeting space, retail, restaurants, spa and fitness center, and pool area, spas, bars, cabanas, tennis courts, gazebo, and reception areas.
LAPD Administration Building Los Angeles, California, USA		The new 500,000-square-foot Police Administration Building is located across the street from City Hall in downtown Los Angeles and includes below-grade parking for 350 cars. This project was one of the largest construction endeavors the City of Los Angeles had undertaken in over a decade. The building has areas dedicated to police administration and investigative operations and feature large assembly areas including a Police Commission hearing room, conference center, a 200-seat cafe and a 400-seat auditorium located outside the building footprint on Main Street to stimulate the street level and serve building occupants as well as serve the general public.
Air Warfare Center - Royal Saudi Air Force Kingdom of Saudi Arabia		Perini Management Services led the design and construction of new facilities at King Abdulaziz Air Base for the Royal Saudi Air Force, though a Foreign Military Sales program administered by the U.S. Air Force. The building scope includes three aircraft maintenance hangars and a squadron operations facility. The civil work includes apron, shoulder, and taxiway paving. Other infrastructure includes 24 aircraft sunshades, aerospace ground equipment storage facility, domestic water and fire protection systems pump building, gatehouse and canopy, generator and enclosure, site preparation, and utility upgrades.

== Controversies ==
In 2002, the firm and the City of San Francisco had a dispute over cost overruns, which settled in 2006 for $19 million with neither side admitting fault; the firm has continued to work on projects in San Francisco.

In March 2011, a jury in Brooklyn found Zohrab B. Marashlian, a former executive of Perini Corp.’s Civil Division, guilty of fraud in connection with construction projects. The judgment was vacated in April 2011 due to Marashalian's death prior to the completion of proceedings.

In In 2018, Tutor Perini and a subcontractor were alleged to have installed standard-strength train rails rather than high-strength rails requested by a San Francisco construction contract. Tutor Perini argued that they were in "full compliance" with the contract specification, as the city requested the special rails only for certain segments of track, such as tight turns. Emails suggested the city knew about the installation of "standard" rails as early as 2015. The city later stated "it is not a safety issue we’re concerned about" but rather about the longevity of the rails. The rails were replaced without incident.

In 2025, a lawsuit regarding the construction of a hotel in Philadelphia was advanced to the damages phase to determine the impact of a construction delay related to concrete flooring. In 2026 Tutor Perini was ordered to pay $174,400,000 for the delays, costs and interest, including $31,000,000 in damages.

== Divisions and subsidiaries ==
Civil

- Tutor Perini Civil
- Frontier-Kemper Constructors, Inc.
- Lunda Construction Company
- Black Construction Corporation
- Becho, Inc.

Building

- Tutor Perini Building Corp.
- Rudolph and Sletten, Inc.
- Roy Anderson Corp
- Perini Management Services, Inc.

Specialty

- Desert Mechanical, Inc.
- Fisk Electric Company
- Five Star Electric
- Nagelbush Mechanical
- WDF Inc.
