= Steve Jobs Theater =

Complex located at Apple Park

Coordinates: 37.3308°N 122.0074°W

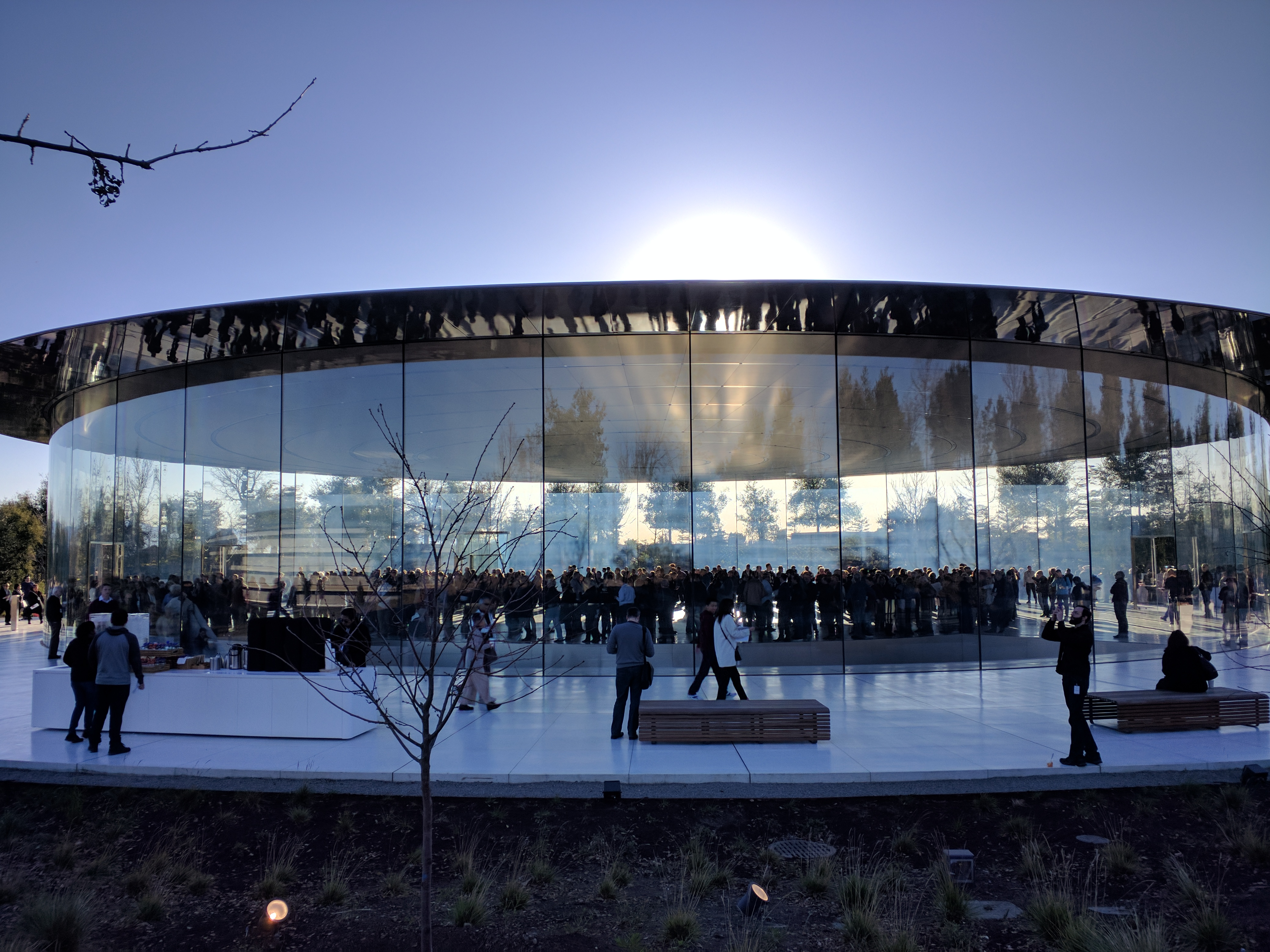
External view of the Steve Jobs Theater at Apple Park in February 2018

The Steve Jobs Theater is an underground auditorium at Apple Park in Cupertino, California. Named after Apple co-founder and former CEO Steve Jobs, it is situated beneath a hill near one of the highest points on the campus. A cylindrical glass pavilion at ground level serves as the entrance, with a subterranean exhibition space that leads to the theater below. The auditorium seats 1,000 people and is used for Apple product announcement press events, sessions during the annual Worldwide Developers Conference, and other company-sponsored events.

== Features ==
The lobby consists of a 22-foot-high (6.7 m) glass cylinder supporting a lens-shaped 80-short-ton (73-metric-ton) carbon-fiber roof composed of 44 radial panels. The structure has no interior support columns, providing unobstructed views of the surrounding campus. Foster and Partners describes it as the world's largest carbon-fiber roof and largest glass-supported structure.

The theater includes a 42-foot (13 m) rotating glass elevator that turns 171 degrees between the auditorium and lobby levels. Constructed from chemically tempered glass, it has been described as the world's tallest free-standing glass elevator.

The auditorium's seating was designed and manufactured by Poltrona Frau. Each seat includes integrated power outlets and folding armrests, and has been reported to cost approximately US$14,000 (equivalent to $18,389 in 2025).

== History ==
The Cupertino City Council unanimously approved Apple's plans for Apple Park on October 15, 2013, after which demolition and site preparation began. On February 22, 2017, Apple announced that the campus auditorium would be named the Steve Jobs Theater.

The theater opened on September 12, 2017, with Apple's "Let's meet at our place" event, where the company introduced the iPhone 8, iPhone 8 Plus, iPhone X, Apple Watch Series 3, and Apple TV 4K.

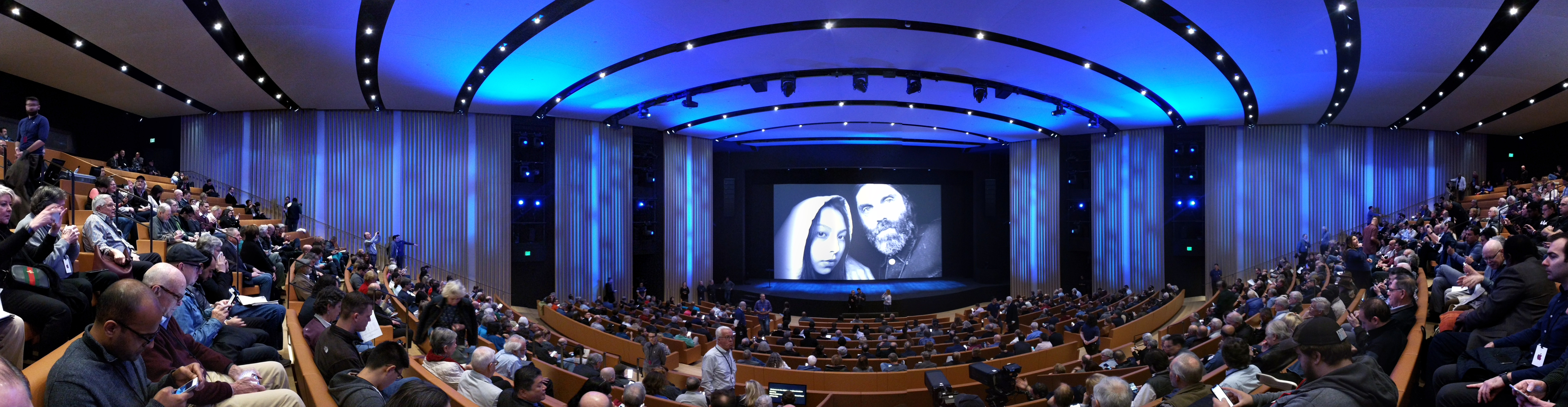
Panorama of the auditorium in the Steve Jobs Theater at Apple Park in Cupertino, California. Taken before the beginning of Apple's first shareholder meeting held in the theater.
