= Seele GmbH =

German engineering and construction company

seele group GmbH
- Type: Gesellschaft mit beschränkter Haftung (GmbH)
- Industry: Construction industry
- Founded: 1984 in Gersthofen, Germany
- Founder: Gerhard Seele, Siegfried Goßner
- Headquarters: Germany
- Number of employees: c. 1,000 (March 31, 2026)
- Website: seele.com

Seele GmbH (stylized as seele) (German: [ˈzeːlə]) is part of the seele group and involved in the design and construction of facades and complex building envelopes made from glass, steel, aluminium, membranes and other materials. It was founded in 1984 by glazier Gerhard Seele and steelwork engineer Siegfried Gossner. About 1,000 employees work at the Seele's locations around the world.

== Projects ==
Notable projects by the seele group includes:

- The company produced facade panes for the Apple Park as well as many Apple Stores.
- Los Angeles County Museum of Art, David Geffen Galleries
- Moynihan Train Hall, New York
- Sphere (venue), Las Vegas
- Toronto Eaton Centre, Bridge over Queen Street, Toronto
- The Henderson, Hong Kong
- King Abdulaziz Center for World Culture, Dharan, Saudi Arabia

== History ==
Seele was founded in 1984 and is based in Gersthofen, near Munich in Bavaria. The city of Gersthofen, Bavaria, in Germany is the location of the central production plant and an engineering design office with more than 450 staff. Consulting, logistics, site supervision and general project management are among Seele's services.

== Company ==
The following companies are part of the seele group (as of August 2026

- seele GmbH, Gersthofen, Germany
- se-austria GmbH & Co. KG, Schörfling, Austria
- seele uk, London, United Kingdom
- seele usa, New York, USA
- seele canada, Toronto, Canada
- seele hongkong, Hong Kong
- seele singapore, Singapore
- seele middle east, Dubai, United Arab Emirates
- seele saudi arabia, Jeddah, Kingdom of Saudi Arabia
- seele pilsen, Pilsen, Czech Republic
- seele france, Strasbourg, France
