= Rudolph and Sletten =

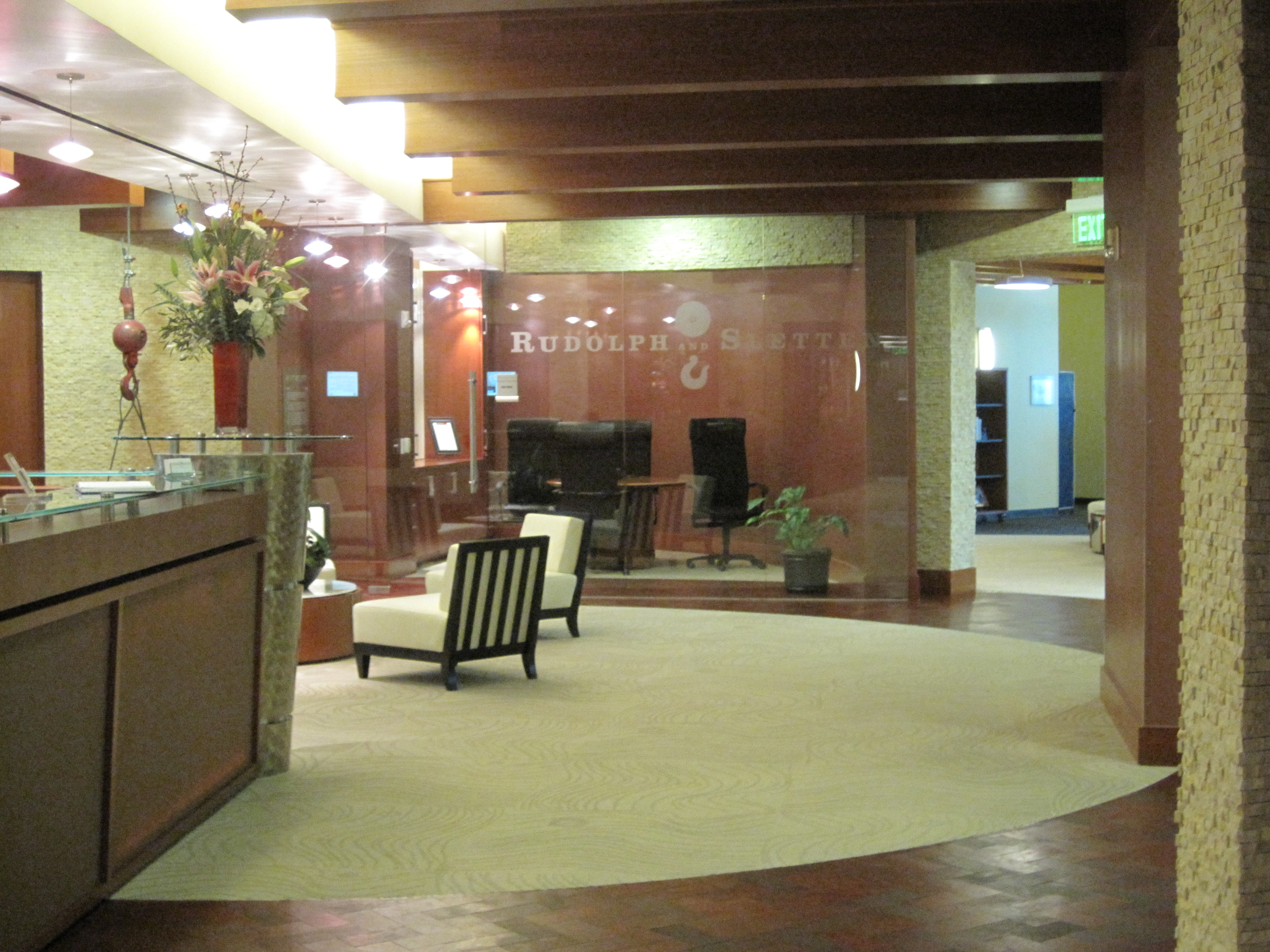
Rudolph and Sletten headquarters in Redwood City, 2010

Rudolph and Sletten is a general contracting firm on the West Coast of the United States providing general contracting and construction management services. The company is headquartered in Menlo Park, California, with regional offices in Los Angeles, Roseville, Irvine, and San Diego.

In 1959 Onslow H. "Rudy" Rudolph formed a small contracting company, O.H. Rudolph, General Contractor, based out of his garage in Los Altos, California. In 1962, Kenneth G. Sletten joined the business as partner and the company was renamed Rudolph and Sletten, Inc., General and Engineering Contractors.

Rudolph and Sletten has grown from a small business to a large corporation with offices throughout California.

The company has 145 LEED certified professionals in-house. LEED certified projects constructed by Rudolph and Sletten include the Molecular Foundry, located on the Lawrence Berkeley National Laboratory campus, as well as other sustainable projects as the Sun Microsystems Santa Clara Campus and Shaklee World Headquarters. Rudolph and Sletten was listed third amongst West Coast Construction companies with the most LEED certified employees according to Sustainable Industry magazine.

The company is the number one healthcare builder in the state of California according to the San Diego Transcript. Rudolph and Sletten is ranked the 7th largest general contractor according ENR magazine's 2007 Top General Contractors list. The firm also has a long history with Apple Inc., having served as the general contractor for both Apple Campus and Apple Park.
