= Naseeb Saliba =

American businessman

Naseeb Michael Saliba (November 3, 1914 – May 22, 2008) was a construction and real estate mogul and global philanthropist. He was born in Ozark, Alabama, to Lebanese immigrants, and later moved to Los Angeles, California, with his family.

In 1942, he founded N.M. Saliba Co., which became one of the most successful heavy construction companies on the West Coast. Following a brief retirement, he co-founded the Tutor-Saliba Corporation with Ronald N. Tutor in 1972. Tutor-Saliba Corp. is responsible for constructing many of California's largest infrastructure projects and landmarks, having completed over $15 billion in projects. In 2008, the company merged with Perini Corporation forming Tutor-Perini Corp.

In 1994, the United States Army Corps of Engineers awarded him its National Contractor of the Year award for civil works projects. In 1997, he received the Ellis Island Medal of Honor. His philanthropic contributions have supported many charitable organizations including Pepperdine University, University of Southern California, St. Francis Medical Center in Lynwood, CA, Desert Hospital in Palm Desert, CA. St. Jude and the University of Balamand in Lebanon. In addition, he was a Trustee for many organizations including the Antiochian Orthodox Church of North America where he has received the Antonian Gold Medal Award which is the highest award that can be bestowed upon layman by the Church.

In 2008, Tutor-Saliba was ranked the 37th largest general contractor in the United States by Engineering News-Record. It claims $2.7 billion under contract in early 2018.

In 2008, Tutor-Saliba and Perini Corp. announced that they will merge in a transaction valued at $862 million creating one of the leading building and civil contractors in the industry. In May of 2009, shareholders voted to change the company's name to Tutor Perini Corporation. The company reported revenue of $5.3 billion in 2020.
