= Apple Park =

Apple headquarters in Cupertino, California, US

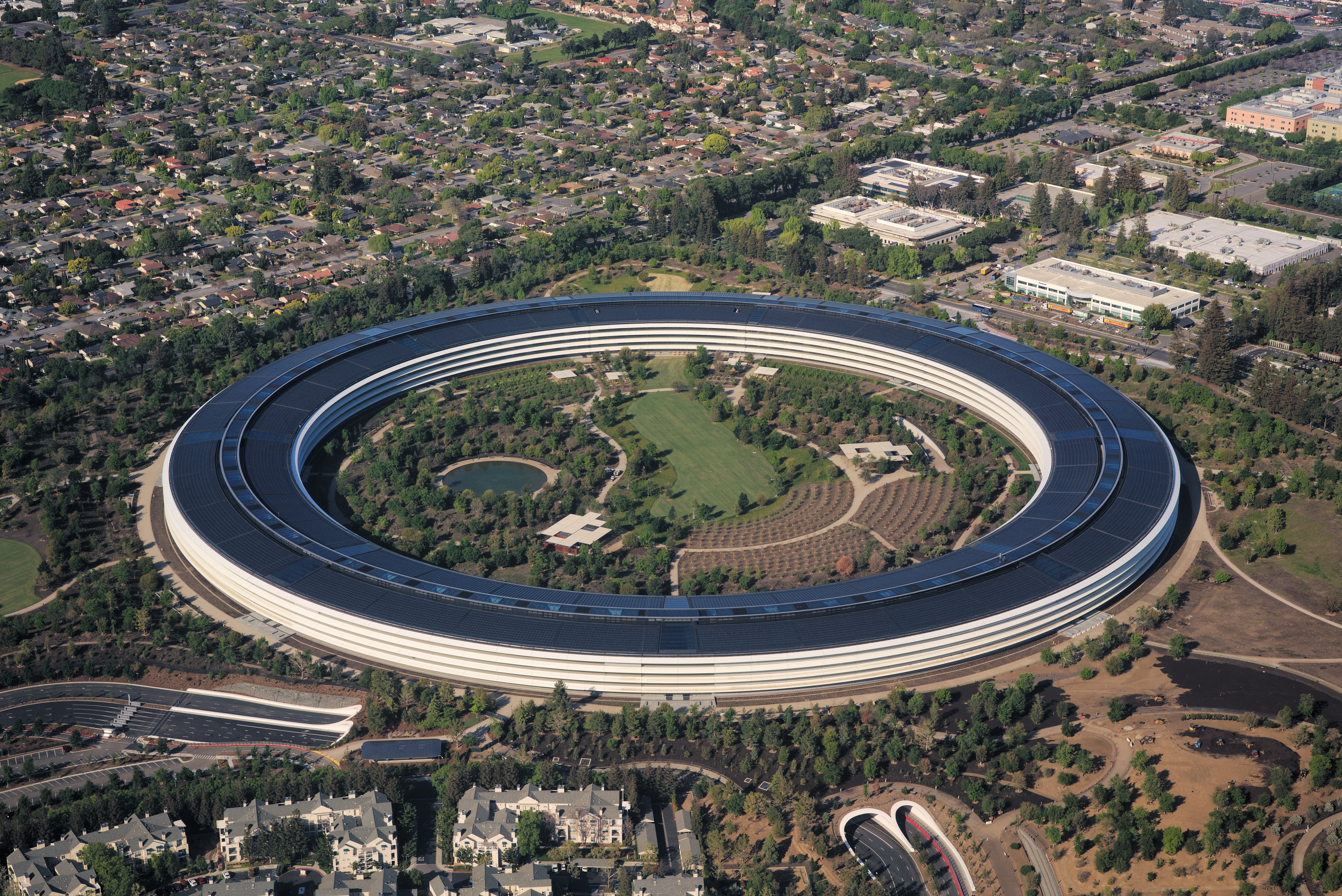
- Aerial view in April 2018

- Location within San Francisco Bay Area Location within California Location within the United States
- Alternative names: Apple Campus 2

General information
- Status: Completed
- Architectural style: Neo-futurism
- Location: 1 Apple Park Way; Cupertino, California; United States
- Coordinates: 37°20′06″N 122°00′32″W
- Named for: Apple
- Groundbreaking: 2013
- Construction started: 2014
- Completed: November 17, 2017
- Opened: April 2017
- Inaugurated: September 12, 2017
- Cost: US$5 billion
- Owner: Apple

Dimensions
- Diameter: 0.29 mi (0.46 km)
- Circumference: 0.91 mi (1.46 km)
- Other dimensions: Accommodating more than 15,000 staff (as of May 2023)

Technical details
- Material: Aluminum, glass, concrete
- Floor count: 4
- Floor area: 2,820,000 ft^{2} (262,000 m^{2})
- Grounds: 64 acres (0.26 km^{2})

Design and construction
- Architect: Norman Foster
- Architecture firm: Foster and Partners
- Structural engineer: Arup
- Services engineer: Arup

Other information
- Parking: 14,200

Apple Park, also known as Apple Campus 2, is the corporate headquarters of Apple, located in Cupertino, California, United States. The campus accommodates more than 12,000 employees, who began moving into the facility in April 2017 while construction was still underway. It replaced the Apple Infinite Loop campus as the company's corporate headquarters.

Designed by Norman Foster, the campus is centered on a four-story, 64-acre (26 ha) circular office building set within a 360-acre (150 ha) site. Its circular groundscraper design has led to the media nickname "the spaceship", while Apple employees have referred to it as "the ring". About 80 percent of the site consists of landscaped green space planted with drought-tolerant trees and vegetation native to the Cupertino area, and the central courtyard includes an artificial pond.

The campus includes the Steve Jobs Theater, Visitor Center, Developer Center, and Observatory – venues which have allowed Apple to host its annual Worldwide Developers Conference at Apple Park since 2022.

== History ==
In June 2011, Apple's then CEO Steve Jobs announced to the city council of Cupertino that Apple had acquired nine contiguous properties to build a second campus, the Apple Campus 2. The idea for a new headquarters was conceived by Jobs and Apple's then-chief designer Jony Ive. Ive was Apple's immediate choice to design the project, going on to work very closely together with Norman Foster across five years, designing every detail, from the glass panels to the elevator buttons.

Purchases of the needed properties were made through the company Hines Interests, which in at least some cases did not disclose the fact that Apple was the ultimate buyer; Philip Mahoney, a partner with a local commercial real estate brokerage, noted that this is common practice in attempts to arrange the purchase of contiguous land made up of multiple parcels with separate owners, in order to keep costs from skyrocketing and not reveal the company's plans to competitors. Among the sellers of the properties were SummerHill Homes (a plot of 8 acres or 3.2 hectares) and Hewlett-Packard (three buildings of their campus in Cupertino).

Until April 2008, Apple had not sought the necessary permits to begin construction, so it was estimated that the project would not be ready in 2010 as originally proposed; however, the buildings on the site were held by Apple for its operations. In November 2010 The Mercury News revealed that Apple had bought an additional 98 acres (40 ha) no longer used by HP, just north across Pruneridge Ave. This space had been the HP campus in Cupertino before it was relocated to Palo Alto.

On June 7, 2011, Jobs presented to the Cupertino City Council the details of the architectural design of the new buildings and their surroundings. Afflicted with pancreatic cancer, Steve Jobs resigned from Apple in August 2011 and died a few months later on October 5th. Jobs' proposal to the Cupertino City Council was his final public appearance before his death.

On October 15, 2013, the Cupertino City Council unanimously approved Apple's plans for the new campus after a six-hour debate. Shortly thereafter, demolition work began to prepare the site for construction.

Originally expected to break ground in 2013 and open in 2015, the project was delayed and started in 2014. On February 22, 2017, Apple announced that the official name of the campus would be "Apple Park", and the auditorium would be named the "Steve Jobs Theater".

The campus opened for workers in April 2017, despite continued construction work. This was followed by the first event in the Steve Jobs Theater, which took place on September 12, 2017. The Apple Park Visitor Center opened two months and five days later, on November 17, 2017.

As a consequence of the construction of Apple Park in the area, surrounding streets have seen increased tourism as well as rising real estate values, due to Apple employees' desire to live near their workplace.

== Location ==
Apple Park is located 1.2 miles (1.9 km) east of Apple's Infinite Loop campus, which previously served as the company's corporate headquarters. Apple has had a presence in Cupertino since 1977, which is why the company decided to build in the area rather than move to a cheaper, distant location. The campus is also next to a contaminated site under Superfund legislation with a groundwater plume found to contain trichloroethylene from improper disposal of industrial waste by semiconductor manufacturers.

== Design and construction ==
Steve Jobs, in June 2011, in his final public appearance before his death, told the Cupertino City Council:

It's got a gorgeous courtyard in the middle, and a lot more. It's a circle, so it's curved all the way round. This is not the cheapest way to build something. Every pane of glass in the main building will be curved. We have a shot at building the best office building in the world. I really do think that architecture students will come here to see it.

The main building is a circular, four-story structure above ground with two underground parking levels. It has a circumference of 4,805 feet (1,465 m) and a diameter of 1,512 feet (461 m). The building is divided into eight sections separated by nine atria, while open corridors run along both the inner and outer edges of each floor.

The campus places most roadways and parking underground, supplemented by two multistory parking garages. The building's exterior consists primarily of curved glass panels that provide views of both the central courtyard and the surrounding landscape. Approximately 83,000 square feet (7,700 m^{2}) is dedicated to meeting and collaboration space. The center of the ring encloses a 30-acre (12 ha) park with an artificial pond, fruit trees, and walking paths inspired by California orchards.

During construction, Apple specified unusually tight manufacturing tolerances for many building components. Interior wood furnishings were made from a selected species of maple sourced specifically for the project, with materials and designs supplied by companies in 19 countries.

The building uses hollow precast concrete floor slabs that serve as structural floors and ceilings while also helping to retain the building's temperature. Approximately 4,300 slabs were installed, some weighing up to 60,000 pounds (27 t).

=== Construction ===
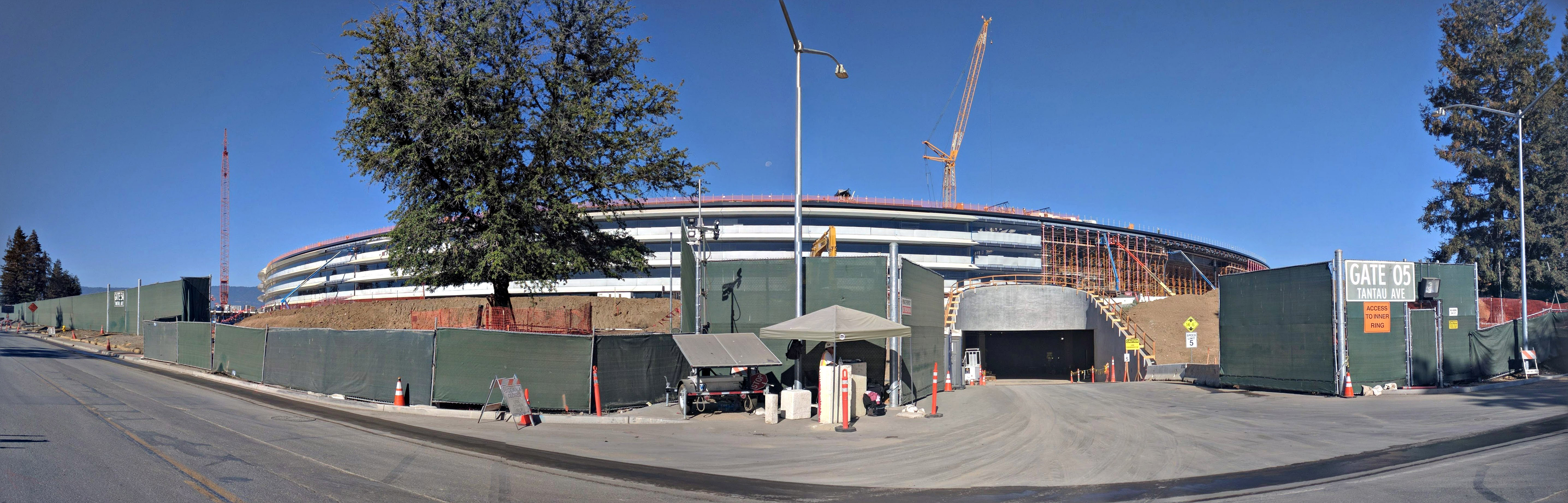
Apple Park under construction, July 2016

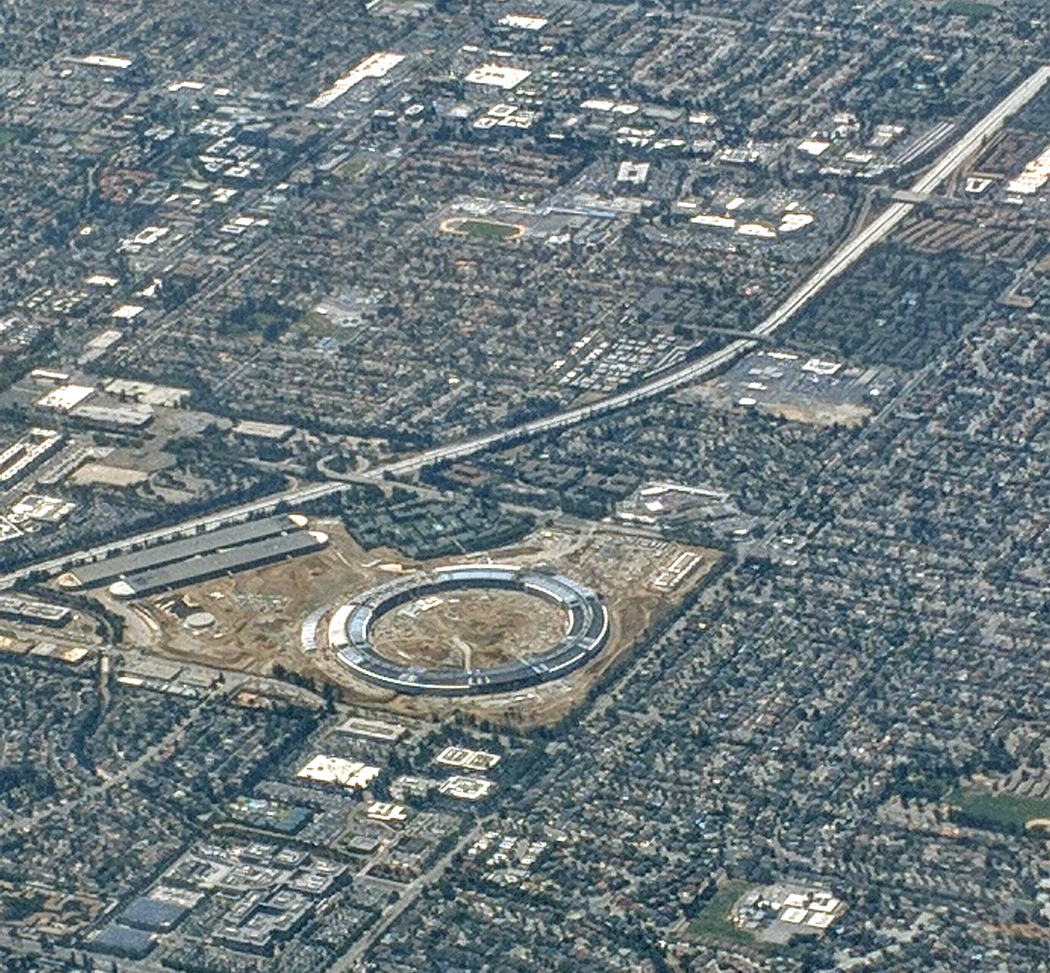
Apple Park aerial view during construction in August 2016, north of (below) I-280. The original Apple Campus, located 1.2 miles westwards, is also shown on the top-right, south of I-280.

During construction, the building's structure was started by Skanska and DPR, but they were removed from the job for undisclosed reasons. Apple hired Rudolph and Sletten and Holder Construction as its new general contractors, and they completed the structure, envelope, and interior buildout. Truebeck Construction (then known as BNBTBuilders) worked on the exterior landscaping, Steve Jobs Theater, and the health and fitness center; a joint venture of BNBuilders and Webcor Builders worked on an adjacent group of research and development buildings; McCarthy Building Companies built the parking garage; and Granite Construction performed road widening and utility work. The project created approximately 13,000 full-time construction jobs.

The facade panes are produced by Bavarian companies Josef Gartner and Sedak. The latter company is a subsidiary of Seele GmbH; Apple had previously worked with Seele, an expert on glass facades, for some of its more prominent Apple Stores such as the one on 5th Avenue in New York City. David Nicholl and Partners delivered the M&E works.

=== Costs ===
Apple Park main building (light green) compared to large ships and buildings: The Pentagon, 1,414 feet, 431 m RMS Queen Mary 2, 1,132 feet, 345 m USS Enterprise, 1,123 feet, 342 m Hindenburg, 804 feet, 245 m Yamato, 863 feet, 263 m Empire State Building, 1,454 feet, 443 m Seawise Giant, 1,503 feet, 458 m Apple Park, 1,522 feet, 464 m

The land cost was estimated at $160 million. In 2011, the budget for Apple Campus 2 was less than $3 billion. However, in 2013 the total cost was estimated to be closer to $5 billion.

=== Energy source ===
The campus was announced as one of the most energy-efficient buildings in the world, and the main building, Steve Jobs Theater, and fitness center are all LEED Platinum certified. In an April 2018 press release, Apple announced that it had switched to being powered entirely by renewable energy. The solar panels installed on the roof of the campus can generate 17 megawatts of power, sufficient to power 75% during peak daytime, and making it one of the largest solar roofs in the world. The other 4 megawatts are generated onsite using Bloom Energy Server fuel cells, which are powered by biofuel or natural gas. The air flows freely between the inside and outside of the building, providing natural ventilation and obviating the need for HVAC systems during nine months of the year.

== Facilities ==
=== Cafés ===
The campus has seven Caffè Macs cafeterias, the largest of which is a three-level dining facility with seating for approximately 3,000 people. The building features light-colored stone, glass railings without visible metal supports, and landscaped outdoor terraces. Its 20,000-square-foot (1,900 m^{2}) mezzanine accommodates approximately 600 additional seats. Like many areas across the building, it has tables made of solid Spessart white oak, measuring 18 ft (5.5 m) long and 4 ft (1.2 m) wide.

=== Auditorium ===
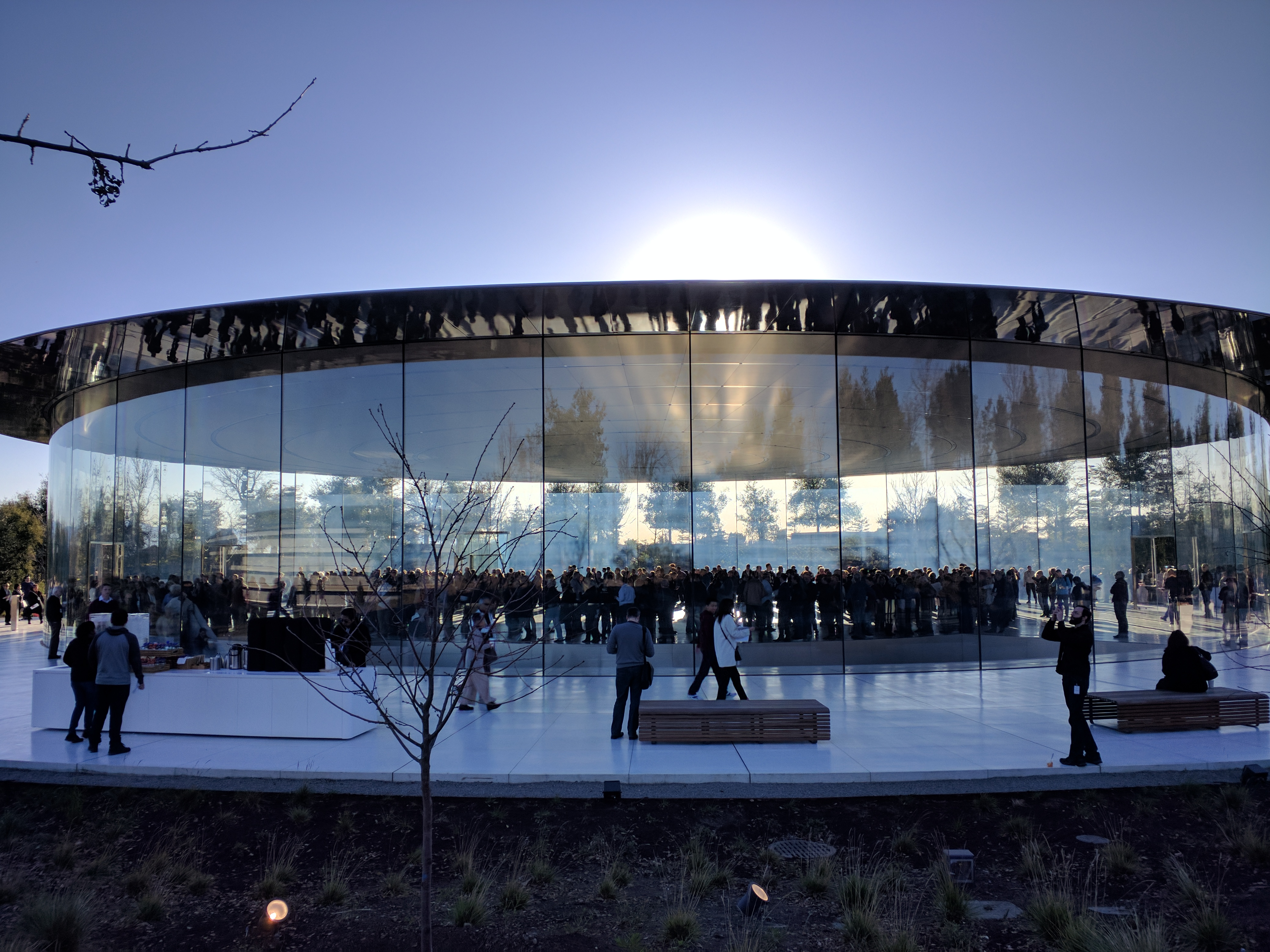
External view of the Steve Jobs Theater at Apple Park in February 2018

The Steve Jobs Theater is an underground auditorium at Apple Park in Cupertino, California. Named after Apple co-founder and former CEO Steve Jobs, it is situated beneath a hill near one of the highest points on the campus. A cylindrical glass pavilion at ground level serves as the entrance, with a subterranean exhibition space that leads to the theater below. The auditorium seats 1,000 people and is used for Apple product announcement press events, sessions during the annual Worldwide Developers Conference, and other company-sponsored events.

=== Wellness center ===
A 100,000-square-foot (9,300 m^{2}) fitness center is located in the northwest of the campus. Apart from gym equipment, the fitness center features other amenities like changing rooms, showers, laundry services, and rooms for group sessions.

=== Research and development facility ===
The research and development facilities feature two large 300,000-square-foot (28,000 m^{2}) buildings on the southern edge of the campus and are occupied by more than 2,000 people. The top floor of each building houses the department comprising industrial design and human interface teams.

=== Observatory ===
The Apple Park Observatory, which opened in 2024, is a subterranean event and exhibition space located in a hillside south of the main building near the Steve Jobs Theater. Designed as an extension of the surrounding landscape, visitors enter via a curved path leading to a domed entrance hall topped by a circular oculus open to the sky. The main event space opens onto a large terrace through a portal-like opening that frames views of the Apple Park campus and the Santa Cruz Mountains beyond.

The Observatory is used for Apple product demonstrations and other events. It is constructed of natural stone, terrazzo, timber, and glass, matching the materials of the nearby Steve Jobs Theater and other Apple Park buildings. During construction, approximately 90 trees were temporarily removed and replanted after the building was completed.

=== Transportation ===
==== Bus ====
Employees traveling by bus will board and depart from the bus station, which leads to the main campus via two white staircases. The area is also served by the Santa Clara Valley Transportation Authority (VTA), which runs a local bus service from Cupertino to nearby cities. Transit consultant Jarrett Walker, who worked with the VTA on providing service to the campus, criticized the campus' design due to its poor access to public transit.

==== Parking ====
Parking is located both underground and in two large parking structures accommodating approximately 14,200 employees. Cupertino regulations required a minimum of 11,000 parking spaces, 700 of which have electric vehicle charging stations.

There are 2,000 parking spaces in the subterranean parking garage. The parking is managed by sensors and apps, which manage the traffic and parking spaces.

==== Cycling ====
There are 1,000 bikes on the campus for employees to get around, with miles of cycling and jogging trails all over the 175-acre (71 ha) campus. There are an additional 2,000 bicycle parking spaces in the subterranean car parking garage.

=== Visitor Center ===
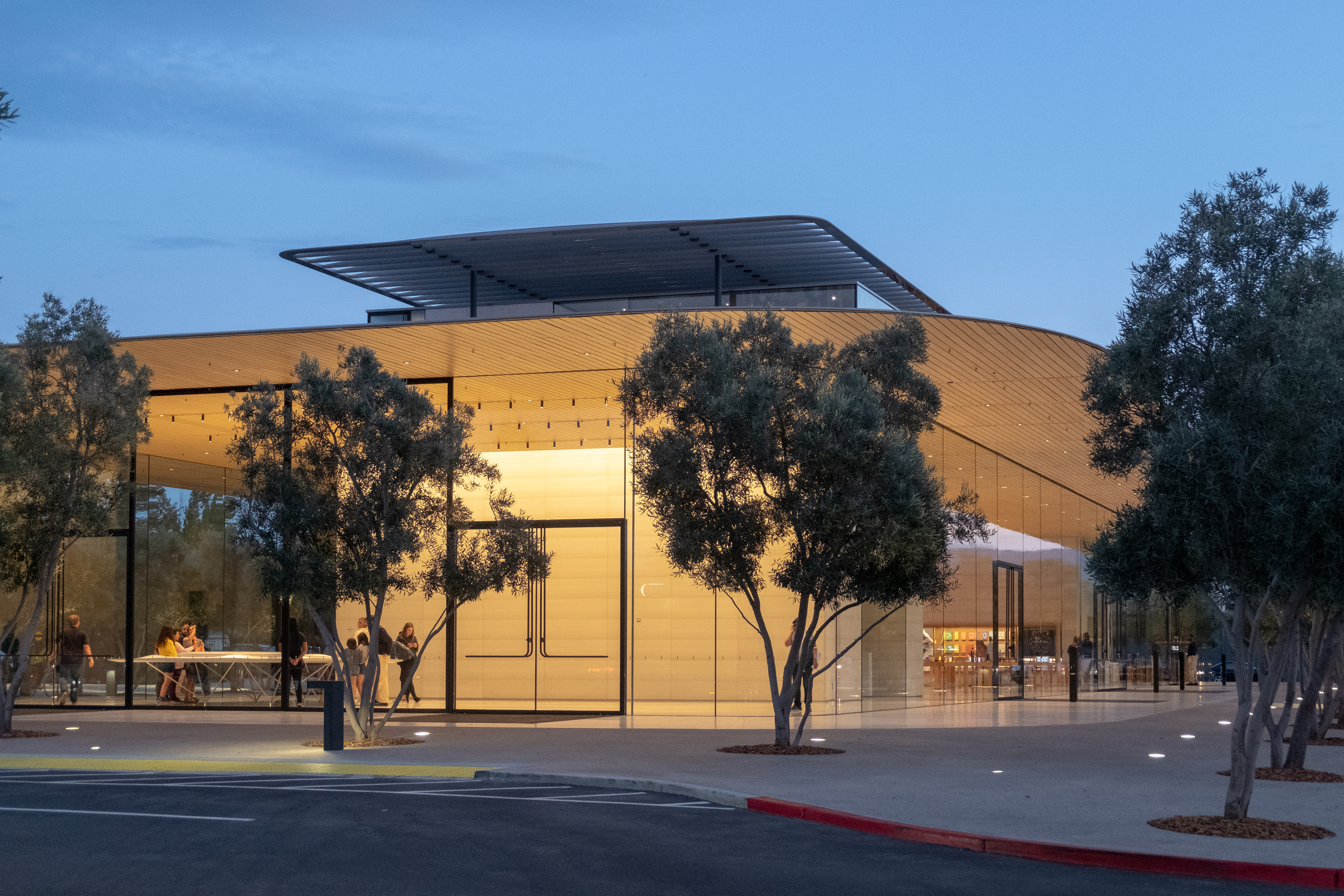
Apple Park Visitor Center

The Apple Park Visitor Center is a two-story, 20,135 square feet (1,870.6 m^{2}) structure with four main areas: an Apple Store featuring Apple-branded merchandise not sold at regular stores, a public Caffè Macs, an exhibition space, and a roof terrace overlooking the campus. It opened to the public on November 17, 2017.

Construction was estimated to cost $80 million, with a further $26 million estimated for the underground parking structure; the building reportedly cost about $4,000 per square foot, more than double the roughly $1,500 per square foot cost of the overall Apple Park project.

The property, at 10600 North Tantau Avenue (northeast corner of Tantau and Pruneridge avenues), is across the road from the Apple Park campus proper and abuts a residential neighborhood.

The site also includes a public art installation called Mirage, located in an olive grove next to the Visitor Center building. The installation consists of more than 400 cast-glass cylinders made from sand originating from 58 deserts around the world. The cylinders are installed side by side, creating a pedestrian path winding through the grove.

Between the surface parking and the three underground garage levels, the center has parking for over 900 vehicles. The Visitor Center is the only part of Apple Park that tourists are permitted to visit.

=== Developer Center ===
The Apple Park Developer Center, also known as the Tantau 14 building, is a two-story facility located at 10500 North Tantau Avenue, directly across the street from the Apple Park Visitor Center at the southeast corner of Tantau and Pruneridge avenues.

Construction began in May 2021, and the center officially opened on June 6, 2022, during Apple's annual Worldwide Developers Conference (WWDC). The facility is used for breakout sessions during WWDC and, throughout the rest of the year, hosts in-person developer activities, including labs, workshops, appointments, and training sessions across a variety of technical disciplines.

The Apple Park Developer Center is one of four Apple Developer Centers worldwide.

== Grounds ==
=== Landscaping ===
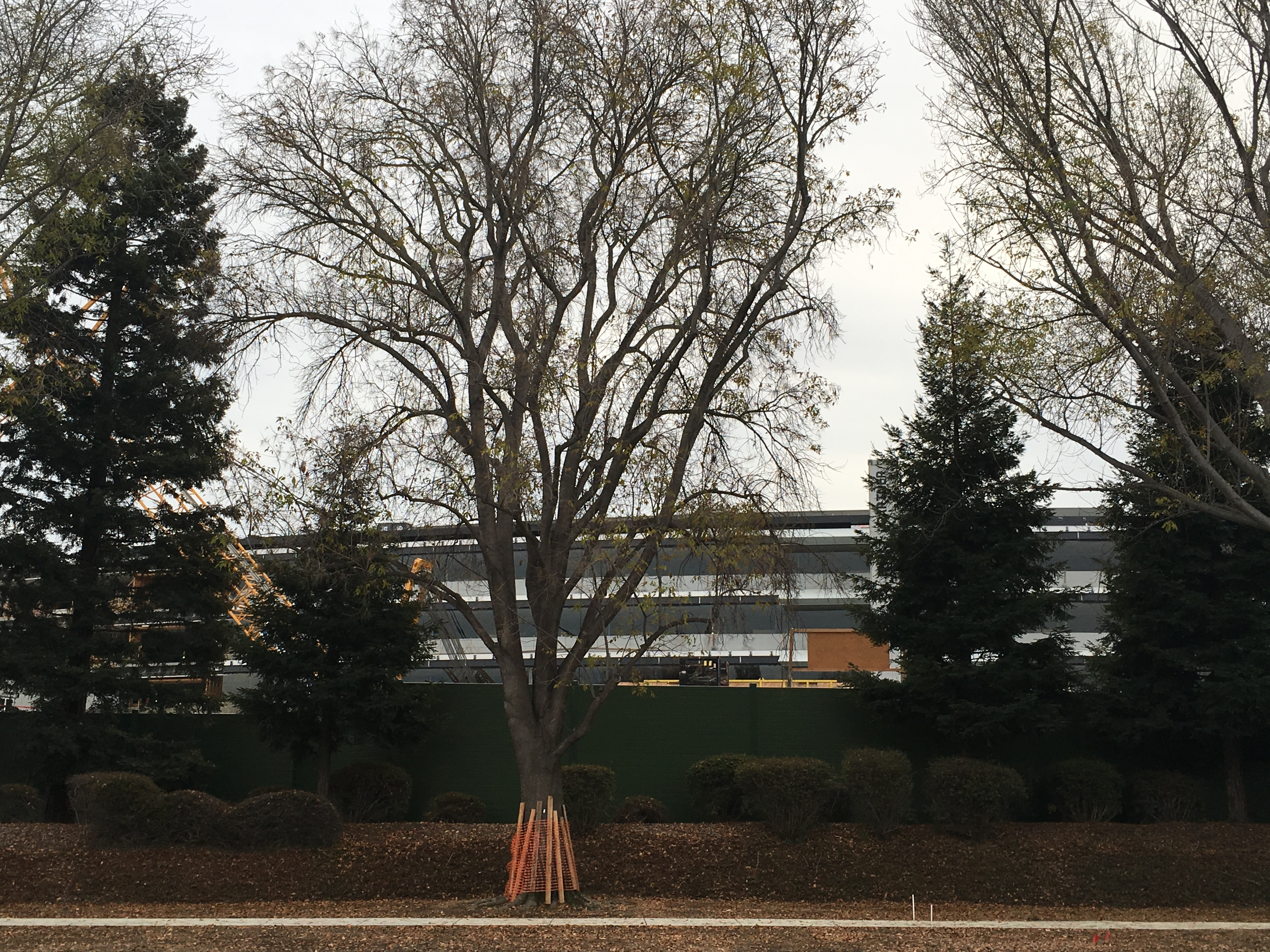
Park under construction, January 2016

80% of the campus consists of green space. The spacious courtyard in the middle of the primary building was planted with apricot, olive, and apple orchards, as well as an herb garden near the cafe. Other plants selected for the campus landscape are drought tolerant. Recycled water is used to water the campus.

In 2011, Apple hired an arborist, Dave Muffly, to cultivate California's natural environment around Apple Park. Apple's headhunters tracked down Muffly in 2010 after Jobs recognized the quality of the oak trees near the Stanford Dish and asked staff to find the arborist who was caring for them.

There are 9,000 trees on the Apple Park campus, of 309 varieties of indigenous species. The planted trees are Oak savanna, Oak wood, and fruit trees including apple, apricot, plum, cherry, and persimmon. An additional 15 acres (6 ha) are used for a native California grassland. Among the apple varieties represented are Golden Delicious, Granny Smith, Gravenstein, and Pink Lady, but the McIntosh is notably absent, due to its incompatibility with the area's climate.

After he began work in earnest, Muffly realized that fewer than a hundred of the 4,000 existing trees were usable. This meant he had to procure from scratch almost all of the 9,000 planned trees. His team went so far as to search abandoned Christmas tree farms, and Apple bought one at Yermo in the Mojave Desert.

=== Public artworks ===
Sculptural installations such as "Mirage" by the Scottish artist Katie Paterson (with the architects Zeller & Moye) and a mirrored obelisk by the designer Sabine Marcelis can be seen on the grounds of Apple Park. The architecture of the main building itself has also been described as a work of art.

=== Glendenning Barn ===
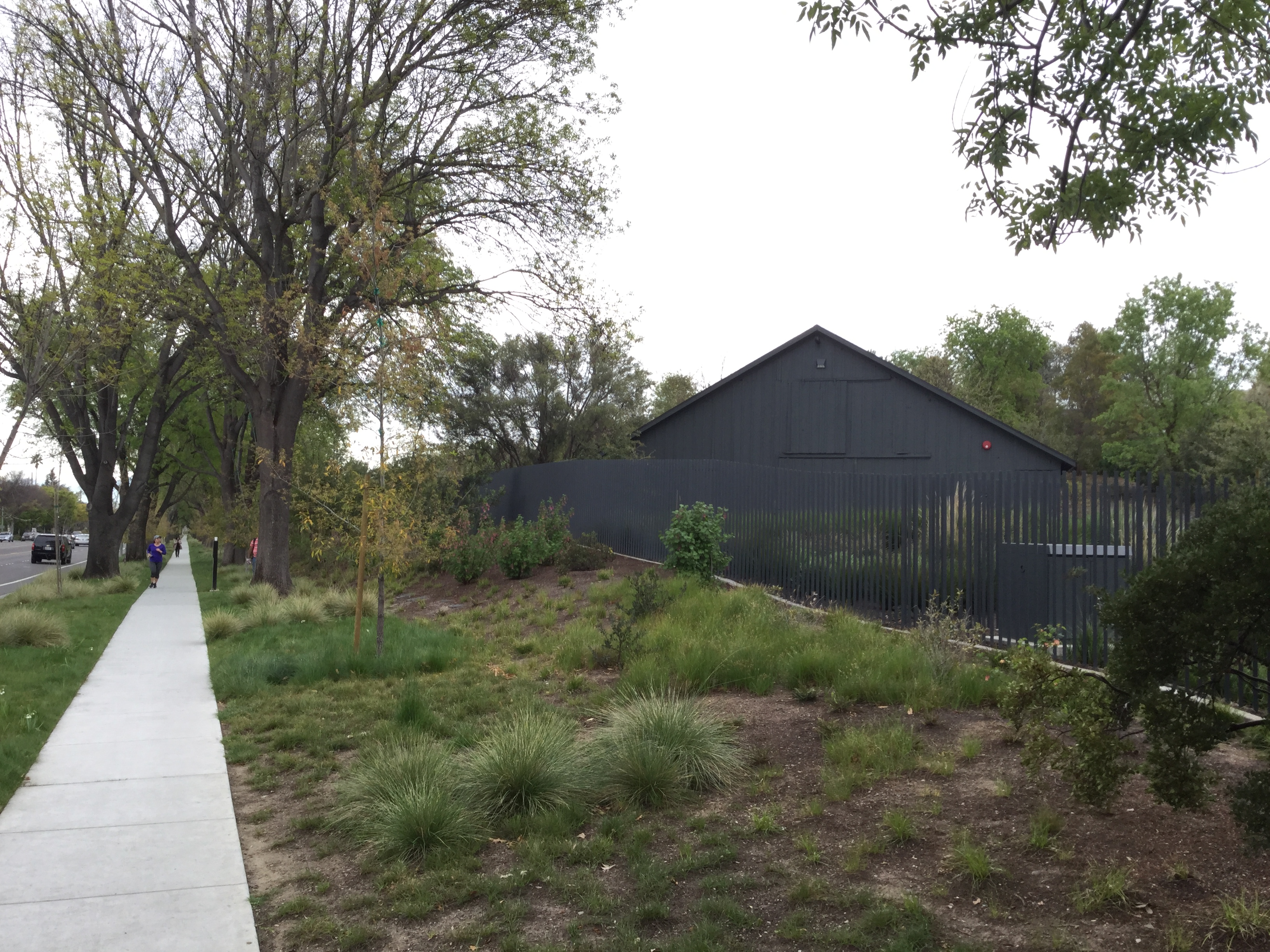
Glendenning Barn as seen from the sidewalk next to Apple Park

The land that Apple purchased for the campus came with a barn that was built in 1916 by John Leonard using redwood planks. Leonard married into the Glendenning Family, who immigrated to the United States from Scotland and settled in the area in the 1850s. The Hewlett-Packard Company bought the land on which the barn stood in 1970s and preserved it among a small grove of redwoods. After Apple purchased the property, there were discussions between Apple, the Cupertino Historical Society, and the city of Cupertino as to the fate of the barn. The city's interest in the barn stemmed from its 2004 declaration as a historical site.

Apple agreed to keep the barn on the property and is using it to "store maintenance tools and other landscaping materials". The barn was disassembled during the campus construction and then reassembled in a different location from where it was originally located.

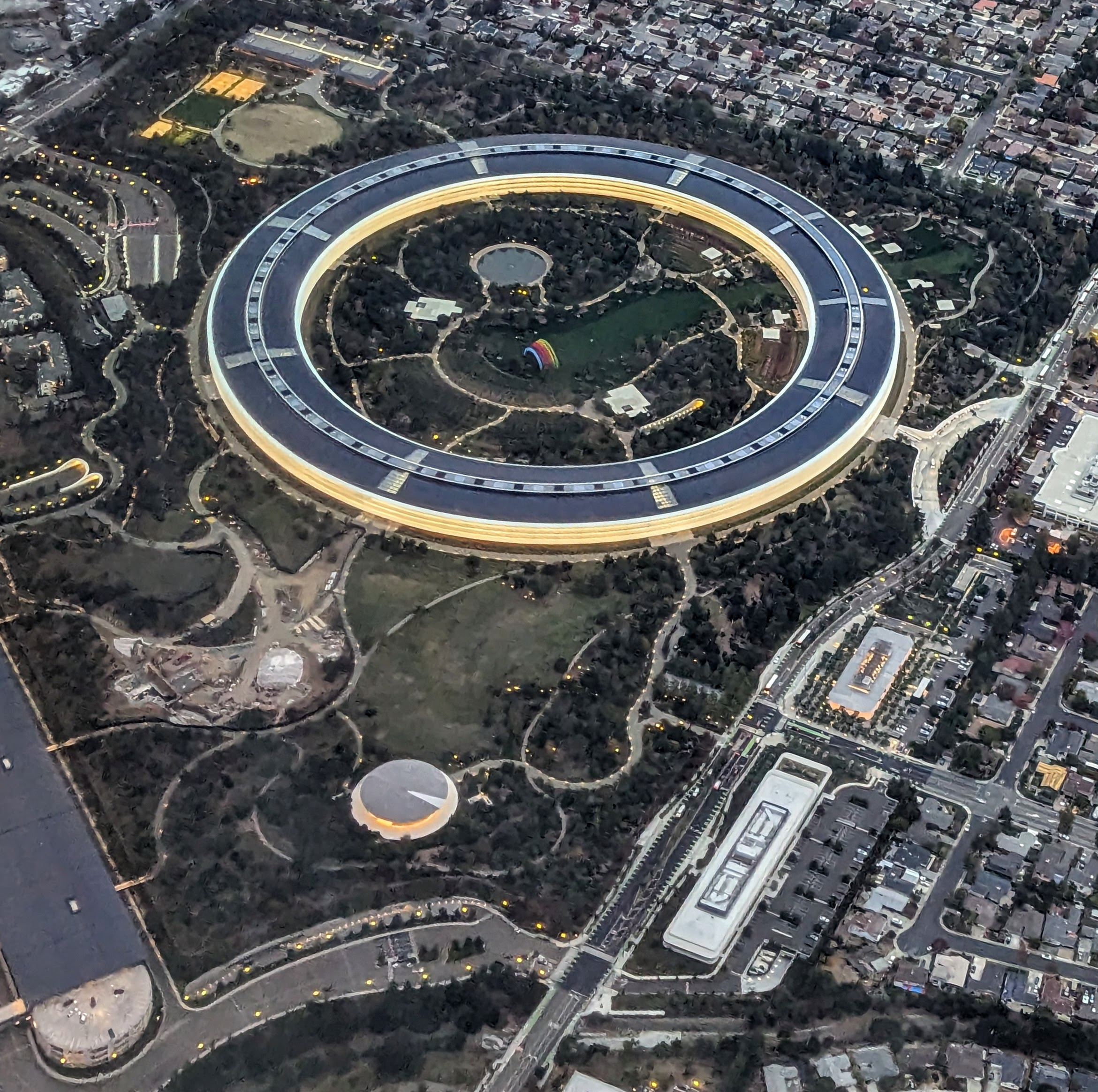
Apple Park near sunset, November 2023

=== Inner courtyard ===
The inner courtyard is 30 acres (12 ha), and lush with fruit trees alongside an artificial pond and a café. In the center, there is a rectangular field with several arches that resemble a rainbow when seen from a distance. The rainbow arches were originally a temporary structure designed by Jony Ive for Apple Park's opening celebration on May 17, 2019. The original structure was removed in early 2025, however, a durable, more permanent structure was rebuilt in April of the same year.

== Reception ==
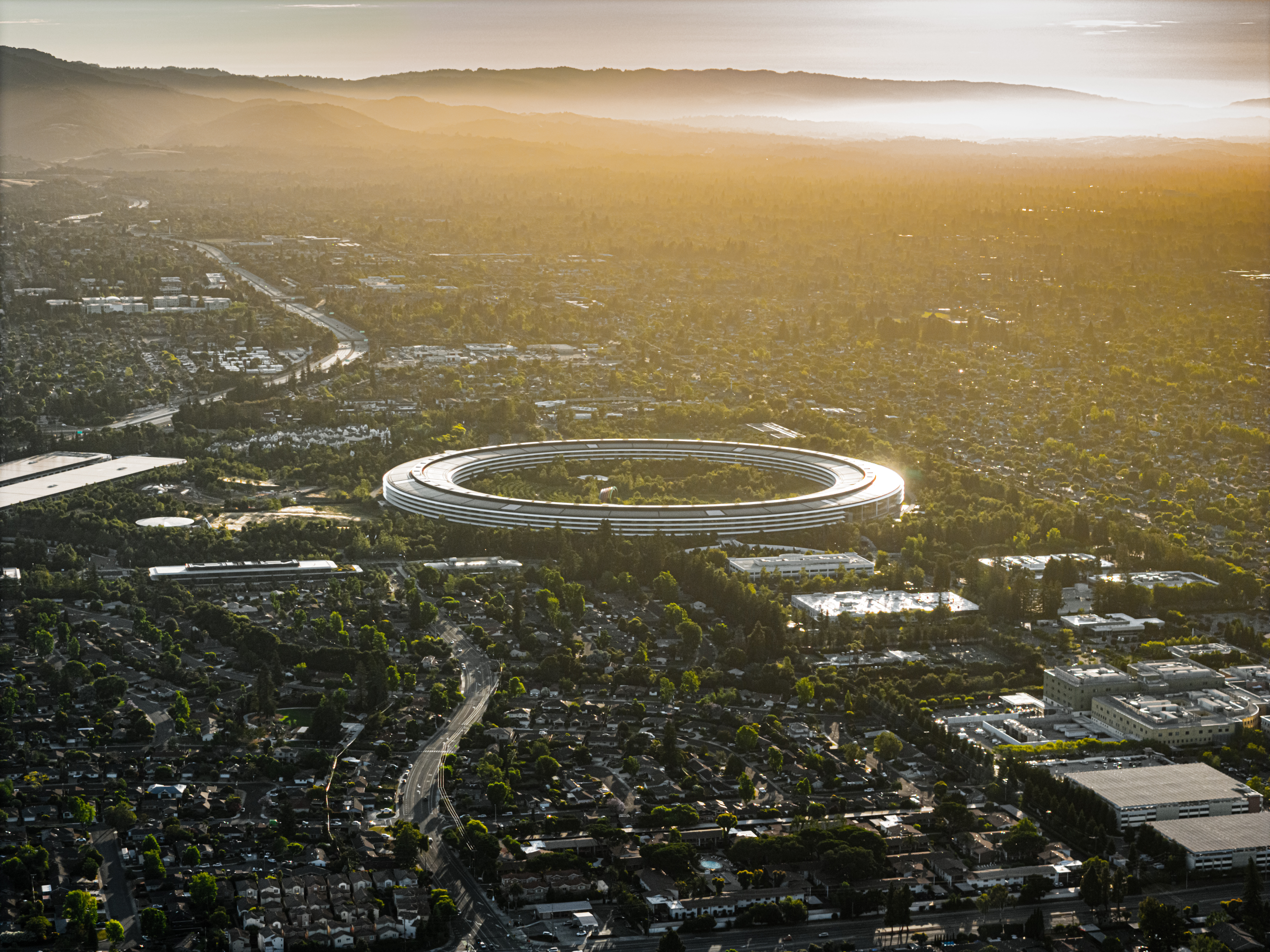
Apple Park in Cupertino during sunset

The design of the Apple Park campus has been called the "ultimate example" of suburban office parks, which have been in decline as companies seek to relocate to urban areas with better transit, bicycle, and pedestrian access. Kaid Benfield of the Natural Resources Defense Council, a non-profit environmental advocacy group, criticized the proposed campus for contributing to existing suburban sprawl, with car-dependent features and waste of expensive real estate that could have been used for affordable housing.

The headquarters also gained unfavorable attention when it emerged in 2018 that two workers had been injured and required hospital treatment after walking into the building's clear glass walls and doors.

Apple received some criticism for the perceived extravagance of its new headquarters, as well as its perfectionist approach to its design and construction. The use of special wood as a construction material was reported to be the subject of a 30-page guideline. The design of door handles was reported to be the subject of a one-and-a-half-year debate, involving several revisions before the Apple management gave its approval. Apple's desire for custom signage put the company at odds with the Santa Clara County Fire Department, requiring several rounds of negotiations due to fears it could compromise safety in case of emergencies.

In her book Brotopia, writer Emily Chang criticized Apple Park for having no daycare facilities for employees' children, despite it ostensibly serving the needs of every individual.
