= Apple Infinite Loop campus =

Former corporate headquarters of Apple Inc. in California, U.S.

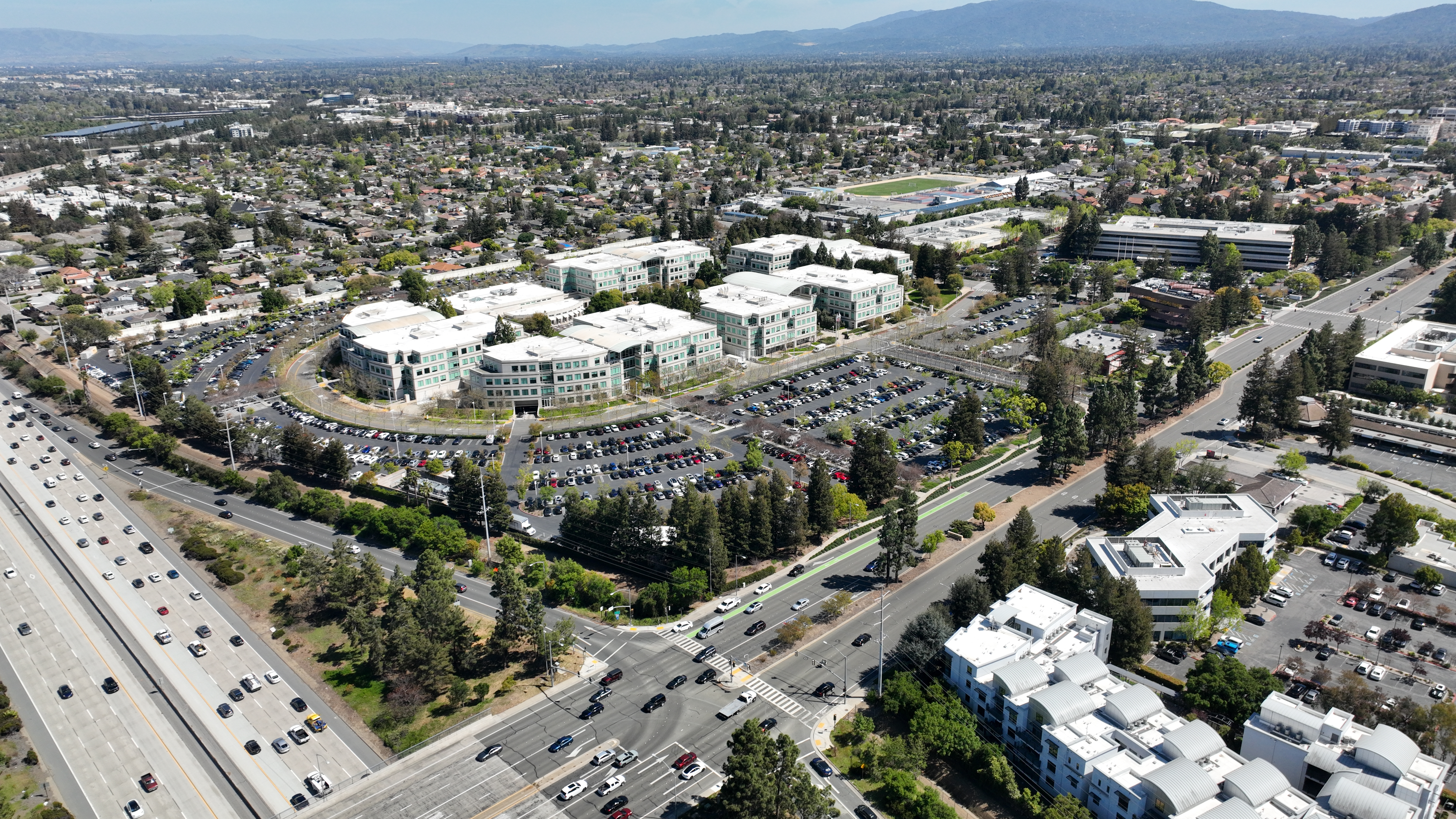
- Apple's Infinite Loop campus in 2023
- Built: 1993
- Location: 1 Infinite Loop Cupertino, CA 95014; Cupertino, California, U.S.
- Coordinates: 37.33182°N 122.03118°W
- Architect: Sobrato Development Company
- Area: 850,000 square feet (79,000 m^{2})
- Owner: Apple

The Apple Infinite Loop campus (also known as Apple Campus 1 and by its address, 1 Infinite Loop) is an office complex owned and occupied by Apple in Cupertino, California. When it opened in 1993, the campus was used exclusively for the company's research and development activities. After returning to Apple in 1997, Steve Jobs made the campus the company's corporate headquarters. It remained Apple's headquarters until the opening of Apple Park in 2017, but continues to house Apple offices and laboratories. The buildings are arranged around landscaped green spaces in a layout resembling a university campus.

== History ==
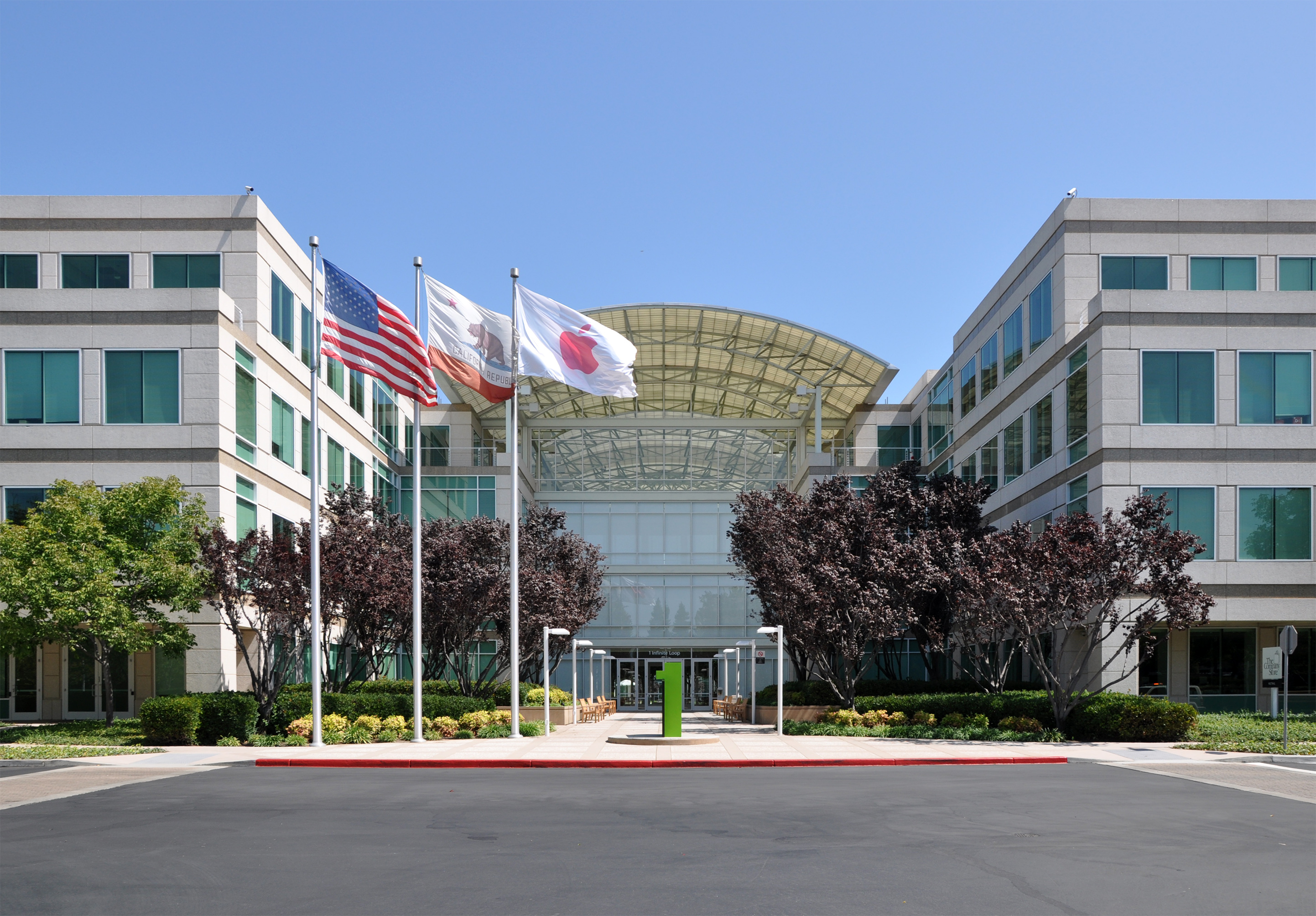
Main building – IL1, from De Anza Boulevard (2011)

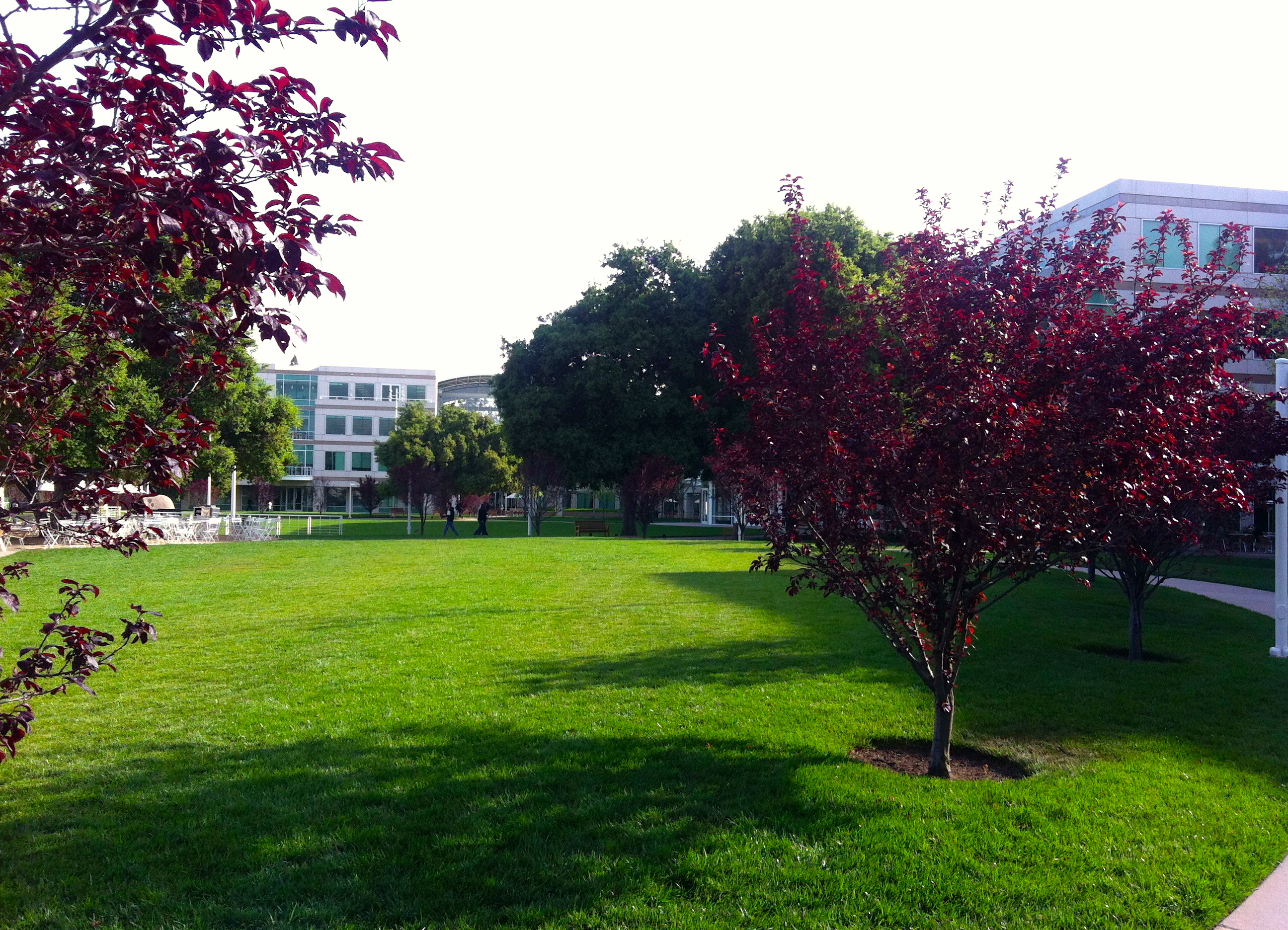
A look at the central landscaped green space from outside Caffè Macs – IL4, looking toward IL6 (2013)

Prior to the construction of the Apple campus, the land was occupied by Four-Phase Systems, later acquired by Motorola. Apple purchased the campus from Motorola for a discounted $25 million after damage from the 1989 earthquake.

Construction of the campus began in 1992 and was completed in 1993 by the Sobrato Development Company. Its area is 850,000 square feet (79,000 m^{2}).

The campus was originally used exclusively for research and development, with Apple's corporate headquarters remaining at 20525 Mariani Avenue (also known as Mariani One). At that time, its buildings were referred to as R&D 1–6. With the return of Steve Jobs to Apple in 1997, the campus became the company's official headquarters, and its buildings were renamed "IL" instead of "R&D".

== Location ==
The Apple Campus is located on the southeast corner of Interstate 280 and De Anza Boulevard and occupies 32 acres (130,000 m^{2}) in six buildings spread over four floors. Each building is numbered with one digit on the private U-shaped street Infinite Loop, so named because of the programming concept of an infinite loop. The street, in conjunction with Mariani Avenue, actually does form a circuit (or cycle) that can circulate indefinitely. The main building has the address 1 Infinite Loop, Cupertino, California. Employees refer to these buildings as IL1 to IL6 for Infinite Loop 1–6.

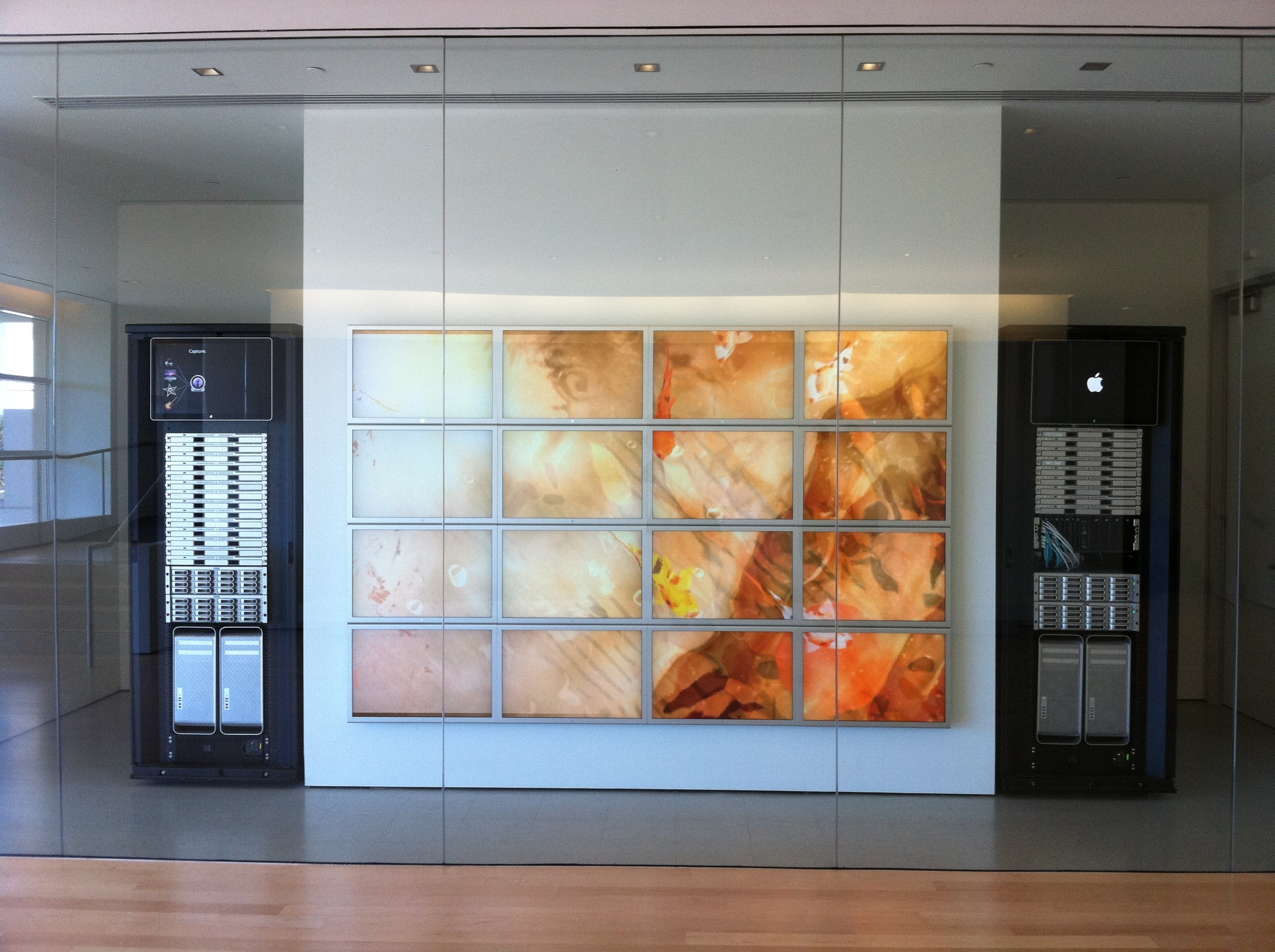
A wall of flatscreens and servers at the Apple Campus's executive briefing center inside IL4 (2010)

The IL4 building contains a Caffè Macs corporate cafeteria with outdoor patio seating, the 300-seat Town Hall auditorium, and the executive briefing center.

The Apple Campus had an Apple Store, first opened in 1993—predating the modern Apple Store chain—and was, at the time, the only place in the world where Apple merchandise could be purchased, including T-shirts, mugs, and pens. It was the only part of the campus open to the public. The store was closed on January 20, 2024.
