= Apple A20 Pro =

System-on-a-chip designed by Apple Inc.

General information
- Launched: September 18, 2026
- Designed by: Apple Inc.
- Common manufacturer: TSMC
- Max. CPU clock rate: to 4.93 GHz

Physical specifications
- Cores: 2 Super cores + 3 (iPad mini) or 4 Efficiency cores
- Memory (RAM): 12 GB
- GPUs: 7-core, with Neural Accelerators and hardware-accelerated ray tracing
- Co-processor: Neural Engine: 16-core (iPad mini) or dual 16-core (all others)

Cache
- L2 cache: 16 MB (p-cores); 8 MB (e-cores)
- L3 cache: 36 MB

Architecture and classification
- Application: Mobile (iPhone, iPad Mini)
- Technology node: 2 nm (TSMC N2)

History
- Predecessor: Apple A19 Pro

The Apple A20 Pro is a 64-bit ARM-based system on a chip (SoC) designed by Apple Inc., part of the Apple silicon series. It was announced on September 9, 2026, and is the successor to the Apple A19 Pro. The A20 Pro is used in the iPhone 18 Pro, iPhone 18 Pro Max, iPhone Duo, and iPad Mini, and is manufactured by TSMC on a 2 nm process node. It is Apple's first A-series chip to use a package that places the memory beside the processor die rather than on top of it.

== History ==
The A20 Pro, which would be used in the iPhone 18 Pro, was allegedly leaked in June 2026 adopting the wafer-level multi-chip module (WMCM) packaging. In addition, information about suppliers, parts, and images was published after confidential Apple files were leaked following a cyberattack on a supplier. (Note: Attributed to multiple references:)

Early details about its chip were reported in August 2026, including its development, speed, and performance. Fixed Focus Digital stated that the A20 Pro chip would be 18% faster with 30% higher power efficiency. Six days prior to the introduction of the A20 Pro, media outlets reported on a leaked solder-joint diagram indicating 7 GPU cores and a 96-bit memory interface, up from the 64-bit interface of the A19 Pro. The seven-core GPU count was subsequently confirmed by Apple; the memory interface width has not been officially disclosed.

Apple announced the A20 Pro alongside the iPhone 18 Pro, iPhone 18 Pro Max, and iPhone Duo on September 9, 2026. The first devices using the chip, the iPhone 18 Pro and iPhone 18 Pro Max, went on sale on September 18, 2026, with the iPhone Duo following on October 23.

== Design ==
=== CPU ===
The A20 Pro includes a 6-core central processing unit (CPU) that supports heterogeneous computing via the use of cores based on two different CPU microarchitectures. Apple refers to them as "super" and "efficiency" cores, optimized for high performance and power efficiency, respectively. The A20 Pro has 2 super cores and 4 efficiency cores, the same 2 + 4 arrangement Apple has used in its iPhone chips since the A11 Bionic. Lower-storage iPad mini configurations use a binned 5-core variant with one efficiency core disabled. Apple describes the CPU as incorporating integrated Neural Accelerators, and states that it is up to 20 percent faster than the A19 Pro.

Apple has not published clock speeds, cache sizes, or transistor count. Pre-release Geekbench listings for iPhone 18 Pro prototypes reported a maximum CPU frequency of approximately 4.93 GHz.

=== GPU ===
The A20 Pro has a 7-core GPU, one core more than the A19 Pro, with Neural Accelerators and hardware-accelerated ray tracing. Apple states that the GPU is up to 40 percent faster than that of the A19 Pro, and describes it as more power efficient.

=== Neural Engine ===
The A20 Pro includes a dual 16-core Neural Engine, for 32 cores in total, doubling the core count of the single 16-core Neural Engine in the A19 Pro. Apple states that this provides twice the AI processing performance of its predecessor, and that the Neural Engine accelerates on-device AI models and computational photography. Lower-storage iPad mini configurations have one Neural Engine disabled. On the iPhone Duo, Apple uses on-device models running on the A20 Pro for a feature that analyzes the camera scene in real time and captures photos automatically. Apple has not published a TOPS figure for the A20 Pro.

=== Memory and packaging ===
The A20 Pro uses a chip package that places the silicon die alongside the memory rather than stacking it, which Apple says removes the memory from the thermal path of the die and allows the chip to be attached directly to the device's vapor chamber. Apple states that the A20 Pro provides 50 percent more unified memory bandwidth than the A19 Pro; absolute bandwidth figures and memory type have not been published. Although Apple does not advertise RAM capacity, MacRumors confirmed through Xcode 27 that the iPhone 18 Pro and iPhone 18 Pro Max each have 12 GB of RAM, unchanged from the iPhone 17 Pro models. Pre-launch reports described the package as using wafer-level multi-chip module (WMCM) technology, but Apple has not used that term.

Because the memory no longer sits above the die, the A20 Pro is mounted directly against the vapor chamber of the device it is installed in. In the iPhone 18 Pro, that vapor chamber has three times the surface area of the one used with the A19 Pro in the iPhone 17 Pro and uses new materials, which 9to5Mac reported include more thermally conductive graphite and nano-twin copper to move heat away from the display. The iPhone Duo pairs the chip with a custom vapor chamber of its own.

As of September 18, 2026, no die-level teardown analysis of the A20 Pro has been published; TechInsights has said it intends to examine the chip's process technology, die architecture, packaging, memory interface, and silicon area allocation.

=== Display engine ===
In the iPhone Duo, Apple states that a new display engine drives the device's inner and outer displays simultaneously to allow transitions between them.

== Performance ==
=== Apple's claims ===
In addition to the chip-level figures, Apple makes device-level comparisons: it states that the iPhone 18 Pro achieves up to a 40 percent gain in sustained performance over the previous generation, and that the iPhone Duo delivers up to 35 percent better sustained performance than the iPhone 17 Pro. Both figures are attributed to the combination of the A20 Pro and a redesigned vapor chamber, which in the iPhone 18 Pro has three times the surface area of the one in the iPhone 17 Pro. Apple also describes the A20 Pro's CPU as the fastest in a smartphone.

=== Benchmarks ===
The day after the announcement, results attributed to iPhone 18 Pro and iPhone 18 Pro Max prototypes appeared in the Geekbench 6 database, with single-core scores of up to 4,725 and multi-core scores of up to 12,677. Averaged, these represented an improvement of roughly 21 to 23 percent over the iPhone 17 Pro models. Early Metal GPU results in the same database were around 38 to 40 percent higher than those of the A19 Pro, broadly consistent with Apple's claim.

In testing of retail review units, Tom's Guide recorded the following results:

Benchmark results (Tom's Guide)
| Benchmark | iPhone 18 Pro | iPhone 18 Pro Max | iPhone 17 Pro | iPhone 17 Pro Max |
|---|---|---|---|---|
| Geekbench 6 (single / multi-core) | 4,735 / 12,800 | 4,741 / 12,789 | 3,834 / 9,988 | 3,871 / 9,968 |
| Geekbench 7 (single / multi-core) | 4,022 / 11,543 | 4,025 / 11,525 | 3,138 / 8,692 | 3,285 / 8,999 |
| 3DMark Solar Bay Unlimited (average frame rate) | 61.93 fps | 67.9 fps | 46.4 fps | 46.6 fps |
| Geekbench AI 1.7 (Core ML, Neural Engine) | 69,245 | 71,974 | 49,050 | 48,549 |
| 3DMark Wild Life Extreme Stress Test (stability) | 62.8% | 79.4% | 61.1% | 65.2% |

Tom's Guide noted that the Geekbench AI score rose substantially but was not double that of the A19 Pro, despite Apple's claim of twice the AI processing performance, and that its sustained-performance testing showed a large stability gain for the iPhone 18 Pro Max but only a marginal one for the smaller iPhone 18 Pro. In the same tests, the A20 Pro outperformed the Samsung Galaxy S26 Ultra in CPU and graphics benchmarks, while the Galaxy S26 Ultra recorded a higher Geekbench AI score using a different inference backend.

In its review, 9to5Mac reported that the A20 Pro's CPU was consistently 22 to 27 percent faster than the A19 Pro and its GPU 40 to 45 percent faster, results that it said matched or exceeded Apple's claims, and described the chip's thermal behaviour as a marked improvement over earlier generations. TechRadar gave a more measured assessment, writing that the chip does not dramatically outpace its immediate predecessors in everyday use while handling iOS tasks and on-device AI features without noticeable slowdown. Reviewers generally reported that the iPhone 18 Pro models did not become uncomfortably warm or throttle noticeably under sustained load.

== Products that include the A20 Pro ==
- iPhone 18 Pro and iPhone 18 Pro Max – announced September 9, 2026; available September 18, 2026.
- iPhone Duo – announced September 9, 2026; available October 23, 2026.
- iPad Mini (A20 Pro) – announced October 26, 2026; available November 6, 2026.

== Technical specifications ==
| Specification | A19 Pro | A20 Pro |
|---|---|---|
| Fabrication process | 3 nm (TSMC) | 2 nm (TSMC) |
| CPU cores | 2 performance + 4 efficiency | 2 super + 3 or 4 efficiency |
| GPU cores | 6 | 7 |
| Neural Engine | 16-core | 16-core or Dual 16-core |
| RAM (iPhone Pro models) | 12 GB | |
| Memory packaging | Stacked on processor | Side by side with processor die |

== See also ==
- System on a chip
- Apple M6
