= IPhone 8 =

Smartphones released by Apple in 2017

iPhone 8 iPhone 8 Plus

- iPhone 8 in Gold
- Developer: Apple
- Type: Smartphone
- Series: iPhone
- First released: September 22, 2017; 9 years ago
- Discontinued: April 15, 2020; 6 years ago
- Predecessor: iPhone 7 and iPhone 7 Plus
- Successor: iPhone XR
- Related: iPhone X
- Compatible networks: GSM, CDMA2000, 3G, EV-DO, HSPA+, LTE, LTE Advanced
- Form factor: Slate
- Dimensions: 8: 138.4 × 67.3 × 7.3 mm (5.45 × 2.65 × 0.29 in); 8 Plus: 158.4 × 78.1 × 7.5 mm (6.24 × 3.07 × 0.30 in)
- Weight: 8: 148 g (5.2 oz); 8 Plus: 202 g (7.1 oz)
- Operating system: Original: iOS 11; Current: iOS 16.7.16, released May 11, 2026
- System-on-chip: Apple A11 Bionic
- CPU: 4 cores at 1.42 GHz: Mistral & 2 cores at 2.39 GHz: Monsoon hexa-core 64-bit
- GPU: Apple-designed 3 core, up to 409 GFLOPS
- Memory: 8: 2 GB LPDDR4X RAM; 8 Plus: 3 GB LPDDR4X RAM
- Storage: 64, 128, or 256 GB NVMe
- Removable storage: None
- Battery: 8: 3.82 V 6.96 W·h (1821 mA·h) Li-ion; 8 Plus: 3.82 V 10.28 W·h (2691 mA·h) Li-ion
- Rear camera: 8: 12 MP with six-element lens, quad-LED "True Tone" flash with Slow Sync, autofocus, IR filter, Burst mode, f/1.8 aperture, 4K video recording at 24, 30, or 60 fps or 1080p at 30 or 60 fps, slow-motion video (1080p at 120 or 240 fps), timelapse with stabilization, panorama, face detection, digital image stabilization, optical image stabilization 8 Plus: In addition to above: A telephoto lens with 2× optical zoom / 10× digital zoom, f/2.8 aperture Portrait Mode Portrait Lighting (beta)
- Front camera: 7 MP, f/2.2 aperture, burst mode, exposure control, face detection, auto-HDR, auto image stabilization, Retina flash, 1080p HD video recording
- Display: 8: 4.7 in (120 mm) Retina HD: LED-backlit IPS LCD, 1334×750 px (326 ppi, aspect ratio 16:9); 8 Plus: 5.5 in (140 mm) Retina HD: LED-backlit IPS LCD, 1920×1080 px (401 ppi, aspect ratio 16:9); All models: 625 cd/m² max. brightness (typical), with dual-ion exchange-strengthened glass and 3D Touch
- Sound: Stereo speakers
- Connectivity: All models: LTE (bands 1 to 5, 7, 8, 12, 13, 17 to 20, 25 to 30, 66), TD-LTE (bands 38 to 41), UMTS/HSPA+/DC-HSDPA (850, 900, 1700/2100, 1900, 2100 MHz), GSM/EDGE (850, 900, 1800, 1900 MHz), Wi-Fi (802.11 a/b/g/n/ac), Bluetooth 5.0, NFC, GPS, GLONASS, Galileo & QZSS; Models A1863 & A1864: TD-SCDMA 1900 (F), 2000 (A) & CDMA2000 EV-DO Rev. A (800, 1900, 2100 MHz)
- Water resistance: IP67
- Hearing aid compatibility: M3, T4
- Made in: China
- Other: FaceTime audio or video, Voice over LTE
- Website: iPhone 8 – Apple at the Wayback Machine (archived November 1, 2017)

The iPhone 8 and iPhone 8 Plus are smartphones developed and marketed by Apple. Alongside the higher-end iPhone X, they are part of the eleventh generation of the iPhone. The iPhone 8 was released on September 22, 2017, succeeding the iPhone 7 and iPhone 7 Plus, respectively.

The designs of the iPhone 8 and 8 Plus are largely similar to that of their predecessors except for the addition of a glass back. The iPhone 8 and 8 Plus were the final flagship iPhone models to feature the home button and Touch ID. Notable changes include the removal of the rose gold and jet black color variants, addition of inductive charging, a faster processor, improved cameras and displays. The iPhone 8 and 8 Plus share most of their internal hardware with the iPhone X.

The iPhone 8 and 8 Plus were discontinued in April 2020, having sold 86.3 million units worldwide, making them one of the best-selling smartphones of all time.

Both the iPhone 8 and 8 Plus originally shipped with iOS 11 and retained software support up until iOS 16, with iOS 17 officially dropping support for the 8, 8 Plus, and iPhone X.

The 2nd and 3rd generations of the entry level iPhone SE retain the iPhone 8's exterior dimensions and Touch ID, with upgraded internals and hardware. (Most notably a processor upgrade with the A13 and A15 Bionic respectively.)

== History ==
Apple invited the press to a media event at the Steve Jobs Theater in the Apple Park campus on September 12, 2017. The iPhone 8 and iPhone 8 Plus were announced at that event, and were later released on September 22, 2017.

On April 9, 2018, Apple introduced an iPhone 8 with a red color finish and a black front, in support of their partnership with Product Red and their AIDS fundraising campaign.

In November 2018, just over a year from initial release, Apple started selling refurbished iPhone 8 models starting at $499. The price was lowered to US$319. Refurbished iPhone 8 Plus models were available starting at $599. The price was also subsequently lowered to US$469 and later to $359.

On April 15, 2020, Apple discontinued the iPhone 8 and 8 Plus and announced the iPhone SE (2nd generation), which shares the 8's external form factor but has upgraded internals, most notably an A13 Bionic processor.

== Specifications ==
=== Hardware ===
The iPhone 8 and 8 Plus were manufactured on contract by Foxconn, Pegatron, and Wintron.

==== Display ====
The iPhone 8 and 8 Plus retain the Retina HD Display found in the iPhone 7, but they now feature True Tone technology, allowing for automatic screen adjustments based on surrounding ambient lighting. They can play HDR10 and Dolby Vision content despite not having an HDR-ready display, done by down-converting the HDR content to fit the display while still having some enhancements to dynamic range, contrast, and wide color gamut compared to standard content.

==== Camera ====
The iPhone 8 and 8 Plus feature a 12 MP camera with autofocus, f/1.8 aperture and optical image stabilization capable of capturing 4K video at 24, 30, or 60 frames per second, or 1080p video at 30, 60, 120 or 240 frames per second, and a Quad LED True Tone Flash with Slow Sync. The Slow Sync flash, 4K 60fps, and 1080p 240 fps options are new features for the 8 and 8 Plus, over the options available on the iPhone 7 and 7 Plus.

The iPhone 8 Plus, like the iPhone 7 Plus, adds a second telephoto lens. A new AI-driven option is available for the iPhone 8 Plus, called Portrait Lighting—making use of the more capable image signal processor in the A11 SoC.

Both models have a 7 MP front camera with an f/2.2 aperture capable of capturing 1080p video at 30 frames per second and 720p video at 24 frames per second, along with face detection and high-dynamic range.

The iPhone 8 and 8 Plus record videos with single channel audio (mono).

Still photos with 6.5 megapixels (3412×1920) can be captured during video recording.

==== Chipset ====
The iPhone 8 and 8 Plus contain the Apple A11 Bionic system-on-chip, a hexa-core processor that the company says features two performance cores that are 25% faster than those found in the iPhone 7's A10 processor and four efficiency cores that are 70% faster than those in the prior model. The phones feature an Apple-designed graphics processing unit 30% faster than prior units, with the same level of performance as the A10 at half the power. The A11 Bionic also includes dedicated neural network hardware that Apple calls a "Neural Engine" making the iPhone 8/8 Plus and iPhone X the first iPhones to have such hardware.

==== Other ====
Color	Name	Bezel
	Product Red	Black
	Space Gray	Black
	Silver	White
	Gold	White

The phones have glass backs instead of the complete aluminum housing found on prior models, enabling the use of Qi inductive charging. The phones are rated IP67 for water resistance and dust resistance. Both models come with 64, 128, and 256 gigabytes storage options, and are offered in Silver, Gold, or Space Gray color options. Its 64gb of base storage is double that of the previous iPhone 7 and 7 Plus. A Product Red special edition version in red with a black front was released on April 13, 2018. The iPhone 8 and 8 Plus were the last iPhones with white front bezels on them, having them on its Silver and Gold color variants specifically.

In addition to Qi wireless charging, the iPhone 8 also supports wired charging using Apple's proprietary Lightning connector. It can fast-charge from a charger that supports USB Power Delivery, needing to be paired with a USB-C to Lightning adapter cable. This makes it the first iPhone to be able to fast charge alongside the iPhone X.

The iPhone 8 has a 6 out of 10 reparability score from iFixit, mainly due to the use of excessive glue for the back glass.

=== Software ===
Both the iPhone 8 and 8 Plus originally shipped with iOS 11 on launch, and support iOS 12, iOS 13, iOS 14, iOS 15 and iOS 16. Apple announced that the iPhone 8 and 8 Plus, as well as the iPhone X, would not support iOS 17 due to hardware limitations. However, the devices still received security updates up until May 11, 2026, coinciding with the release of iOS 16.7.16.

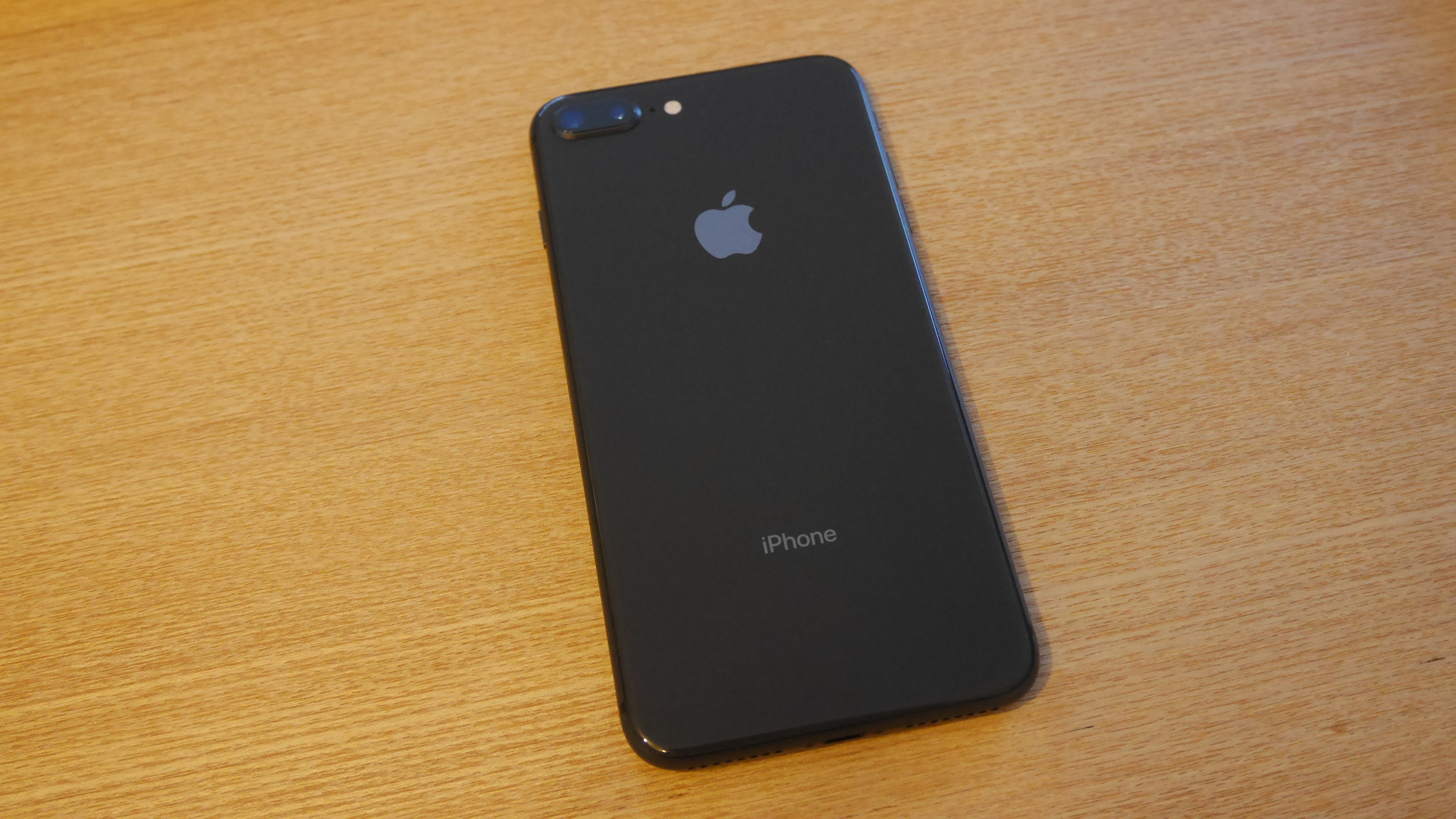
Backside view of a Space Gray iPhone 8 Plus.

== Reception ==
Reception of the phones was generally positive, with reviewers praising the addition of inductive charging, fast charge capability, and the new Apple A11 processor, while criticizing the aging design that was introduced with the iPhone 6 and iPhone 6 Plus in 2014.

Samuel Axon of Ars Technica called the A11 processor "a marvelous feat of engineering", writing that it offers "industry-leading performance". Axon also praised the cameras, writing that "The colors are great, and low light performance is very good for a smartphone". Chris Velazco of Engadget praised the speed of the A11 processor, the build quality and the "excellent" camera, while criticizing design familiarities with previous iPhone generations and limited water-protection levels compared to competitors.

John McCann of TechRadar enjoyed the feel of the glass back despite criticizing the phone's overall design. McCann also praised the camera and called inductive charging a "useful" addition to the iPhone lineup.

David Pierce of Wired similarly stated that the iPhone 8 models were overshadowed by the iPhone X, despite calling them "virtually perfect phones". Pierce praised performance, cameras, and displays, while repeatedly criticizing the "outdated" design.

Nilay Patel of The Verge called the iPhone 8 the "default option", noting that the 8 models stand as almost universally overlooked by Apple's other new iPhone launch, the iPhone X. He nevertheless praised the device's form factor for being easy and non-slippery to hold and the display's addition of True Tone technology and upgraded speakers, though he cited issues with inductive charging speed through wireless pads as well as the price of the iPhone 8 Plus 256 GB, which was close to that of the iPhone X. Patel also criticized the iPhone 8's aging design, dating back to the iPhone 6 released in 2014; the most notable critique was of the thick bezels when compared to other 2017 smartphones, designed with nearly bezel-less faces to incorporate larger screens in a similar form factor.

The iPhone 8 and 8 Plus were also criticized for their durability, as performed drop tests showed that the rear glass is not "the most durable glass ever in a smartphone", as claimed by Apple.

Camera testing company DxOMark gave the camera on the iPhone 8 a rating of 92 and 8 Plus a rating of 94, giving them the title of best smartphone cameras tested by the company. The Samsung Galaxy Note 8 later matched the iPhone 8 Plus with an identical overall score of 94. They were later overtaken by the Google Pixel 2, which scored a 98 rating.

Although being the first mobile phone to record 2160p at 60 frames per second, the iPhone 8, 8 Plus and X have been criticized in a review by GSMArena for their mono (single-channel) audio recording for videos, while stereo audio recording for videos has been available on competing mobile phone models for several years, such as the Samsung Galaxy S3 and Sony Xperia S from 2012.

== Issues ==
On August 31, 2018, Apple announced that a "very small percentage" of iPhone 8 devices released between September 2017 and March 2018 contained a manufacturing defect in the logic board. This fault affected iPhone 8 models sold in Australia, China, Hong Kong, India, Japan, Macau, New Zealand, and the United States. Defective devices may experience unexpected reboots, a frozen or unresponsive screen, or may fail to turn on. Users with an affected device, as determined by their serial number, can have their device replaced for free by Apple. This issue does not affect the iPhone 8 Plus.

== See also ==
- History of iPhone
- List of iPhone models
- List of best-selling mobile phones
- Timeline of iPhone models

Preceded by iPhone 7 / 7 Plus	iPhone; 11th generation alongside iPhone X	Succeeded by iPhone XR
