= IPhone 18 Pro =

2026 smartphone by Apple

iPhone 18 Pro iPhone 18 Pro Max

- iPhone 18 Pro in Burgundy
- Developer: Apple
- Type: Smartphone
- Series: iPhone
- First released: September 18, 2026; 2 months ago
- Predecessor: iPhone 17 Pro and Pro Max
- Related: iPhone Duo
- Compatible networks: 2G GSM/EDGE, 3G UMTS/HSPA+, 4G LTE, 5G NR/5G-A
- Form factor: Slate
- Colors: Burgundy; Glacier; Silver; Black
- Dimensions: Pro: 150.0 mm × 71.9 mm × 8.75 mm (5.91 in × 2.83 in × 0.34 in); Pro Max: 163.4 mm × 78.0 mm × 8.75 mm (6.43 in × 3.07 in × 0.34 in)
- Weight: Pro: 211 g (7.44 oz); Pro Max: 249 g (8.78 oz)
- Operating system: Original: iOS 27; Current: iOS 27.2.1, released November 9, 2026
- System-on-chip: Apple A20 Pro
- Modem: 18 Pro: Apple C2; 18 Pro Max: Qualcomm Snapdragon X80 (US only), Apple C2 (ROW)
- Memory: 12 GB LPDDR5X
- Storage: 256 GB; 512 GB; 1 TB; 2 TB; NVMe
- Battery: Pro: (physical SIM): 15.855Wh (4,056 mAh) @ 3.909V (eSIM): 16.758Wh (4,288 mAh) @ 3.908V; Pro Max: (physical SIM): 21.063Wh (5,391 mAh) @ 3.907V (eSIM): 21.751Wh (5,567 mAh) @ 3.907V
- Charging: MagSafe and Qi 2 wireless; USB-C fast-charge; Up to 50% charge in 15 minutes with 60 W adaptor or higher, provided via 15 V or 18V using a PD3.2 AVS SPR power supply
- Display: Pro: 6.3 in (160 mm) 2622 × 1206-pixel resolution at 460 ppi; Pro Max: 6.9 in (175 mm) 2868 × 1320 pixel resolution at 460 ppi; ProMotion technology with adaptive refresh rates up to 120 Hz; Always-On display at 1 Hz; Wide color gamut (P3); 2,000,000:1 contrast ratio (typical); 1,000 nits max brightness (typical); 1,600 nits peak brightness (HDR); 3,000 nits peak brightness (outdoor); 1 nit minimum brightness
- Sound: Stereo speakers, spatial audio
- Connectivity: Wi-Fi 7 tri-band, Bluetooth 6.0 (A2DP, LE), Ultra-wideband, Thread, NFC (reader mode, Express Cards), LEO satellite (Globalstar, limited), USB-C: USB 10Gbps, Dual-frequency GPS (L1, L5), GLONASS, Galileo, QZSS, BeiDou, NavIC
- Water resistance: IP68 dust/water resistant (up to 6 m for 30 minutes)
- Made in: China, India
- Other: Emergency SOS, Messages and Find My via satellite, FaceTime Audio or Video at 1080p over Wi-Fi and 5G, Voice over 5G Standalone (if supported by the carrier)
- Website: www.apple.com/iphone-18-pro

The iPhone 18 Pro and iPhone 18 Pro Max are smartphones developed and marketed by Apple. Alongside the iPhone Duo, they form the twentieth generation of the iPhone, succeeding the iPhone 17 Pro and iPhone 17 Pro Max. They were unveiled during the Apple Event at Apple Park in Cupertino, California, on September 9, 2026. The models were released on September 18, 2026.

== Overview ==
The iPhone 18 Pro was announced at an Apple Event with the tagline "Surprise and shine" on September 9, 2026. (Note: The tagline for the event varies by language and in some cases by country, instead of being a direct translation of the English tagline.) The announcement of the iPhone 18 Pro marked the first time that a new Pro model of the iPhone was revealed without a corresponding non-Pro model with the same generation number-in this case the iPhone 18-being announced at the same event.

Pricing started at US$1,199 for the Pro and $1,299 for the Pro Max, an increase of $100 compared to $1,099 and $1,199 starting prices for the iPhone 17 Pro and Pro Max respectively, due to soaring costs of memory chips and SSDs.

== Design ==
The iPhone 18 Pro comes in four colors: Black, Glacier, Burgundy, and Silver.

Model	iPhone 18 Pro and 18 Pro Max
Base colors	Burgundy; Glacier; Silver; Black

== Specifications ==
=== Chipset ===
The iPhone 18 Pro and Pro Max use the Apple A20 Pro chip. According to Apple, it is up to 40% faster than the Apple A19 Pro chip from its predecessor and has "M Series inspired packaging".

=== Display ===
The iPhone 18 Pro uses a 6.3-inch (160 mm) OLED display (2622×1206-pixel resolution), while the iPhone 18 Pro Max uses a 6.9-inch (180 mm) OLED Super Retina XDR display (2868×1320-pixel resolution). Both models have a smaller "Dynamic Island" cutout than the iPhone 17 Pro models, replacing the design that has been used since the iPhone 14 Pro.

=== Camera ===
iPhone 18 Pro camera variable aperture settings

The iPhone 18 Pro and Pro Max are the first iPhones to feature a physical aperture in their camera system, as well as the first to use variable-aperture cameras.

The iPhone 18 Pro and Pro Max cameras have the ability to create cryptographically signed reference images that cannot be altered to prove that the image is legitimate.

=== Connectivity ===
The iPhone 18 Pro uses the new 5G over satellite infrastructure using Apple's C2 modem and the Apple U2 ultra wideband chip. The iPhone 18 Pro Max also utilizes Apple's C2 modem, except in the United States where it uses the Qualcomm Snapdragon X80, the same used in the iPhone 17 Pro.

=== Battery ===
The iPhone 18 Pro uses a 4,056 mAh battery for physical SIM version and 4,288 mAh for eSIM version. For the iPhone 18 Pro Max, there is a 5,391 mAh for physical SIM version and 5,567 mAh for the eSIM version. Apple says that the iPhone 18 Pro can be charged up to 50 percent in 15 minutes.

In order to comply with international shipping regulations which affect the shipment of batteries with a capacity of over 20 watt-hours, the iPhone 18 Pro Max is shipped with a firmware lock to limit battery capacity until the phone is activated. If a user needs to ship their activated phone for repair or resale, a new Prepare to Ship feature is available to temporarily re-enable this limit, after discharging the battery if necessary.

== Software ==
The devices shipped with iOS 27, both compatible with on-device Apple Intelligence features, including custom Siri voices and on-device Siri AI. The reduced Dynamic Island displays up to three live activities and a more circular Siri AI.

The iPhone 18 Pro and 18 Pro Max both introduce a camera variable aperture settings menu in the Camera app.

== Release ==
The iPhone 18 Pro has a starting price of US$1,199. Pre-orders for the iPhone 18 Pro and iPhone 18 Pro Max started on September 12, 2026, followed by the release on September 18, 2026.

=== Availability by region ===
September 18, 2026

- Australia
- Austria
- Belgium
- Brazil
- Canada
- China
- Colombia
- Croatia
- Czech Republic
- Denmark
- Finland
- France
- Germany
- Hong Kong
- Hungary
- India
- Ireland
- Italy
- Japan
- Luxembourg
- Macau
- Malaysia
- Mexico
- Netherlands
- New Zealand
- Norway
- Poland
- Portugal
- Romania
- Saudi Arabia
- Singapore
- Serbia
- Slovakia
- South Korea
- Spain
- Sweden
- Switzerland
- Taiwan
- Thailand
- Turkey
- United Arab Emirates
- United Kingdom
- United States
- Vietnam
- Maldives

September 22, 2026

- Chile

September 25, 2026

- Argentina
- Bahrain
- Bhutan
- Cyprus
- Egypt
- Israel
- Jordan
- Kuwait
- Oman
- Pakistan
- Peru
- Qatar
- South Africa
- Ukraine

October 1, 2026

- Nepal

October 11, 2026

- Bangladesh

October 16, 2026

- Indonesia
- Philippines

== Reception ==
=== Critical reviews ===
Commentary on the iPhone 18 Pro's pricing was mixed. Ahead of the announcement, GF Securities analyst Jeff Pu downgraded Apple stock to "hold", citing expected increases of $200 to $300 driven by TSMC wafer, DRAM and NAND flash memory costs, and argued that a higher price combined with iterative hardware upgrades could weaken demand. After Bloomberg reported that the increase would be $100, 9to5Mac characterized the rise as smaller than many analysts had projected. Tom's Guide noted that the out-of-warranty battery service fee also rose, from $119 on the iPhone 17 Pro to $129.

The camera system drew the most consistent praise. Engadget rated the iPhone 18 Pro 9 out of 10, describing its camera performance as the best of any iPhone and stating that variable aperture had narrowed the gap with the Google Pixel series in portrait and night photography, though it considered the Pixel still ahead in those modes. Tom's Guide awarded 4.5 out of 5, citing the variable aperture camera and the newly added manual Pro controls. Reviewing the camera system for PetaPixel, Jaron Schneider said he had been underwhelmed by the keynote but concluded after extended testing that the photographic experience was markedly improved, highlighting the variable aperture in video, autofocus tracking he compared to a mirrorless camera, and the Reference Image authentication system.

Several reviewers questioned the overall value of the upgrade. MacRumors concluded that there was no compelling reason to move from an iPhone 17 Pro or an iPhone 16 Pro, while recommending the model to owners of an iPhone 14 Pro or older.

iFixit's teardown of the iPhone 18 Pro reveals a repair issue where the plastic frame would get damaged after opening, and it has given a repairability score of 7 out of 10 due to issues with the frame, along with other tests done on the phone. iFixit says that it has carried the same repairability strengths as the iPhone 17 Pro.

== Issues ==
=== Face ID issues ===
Upon release, some iPhone 18 Pro users reported Face ID problems where the phone would not unlock, or the phone would freeze, and eventually reboots to the lock screen. Apple has released iOS 27.0.1 on September 28, 2026, to resolve the issue. In some cases, problems related to Face ID issues were caused by screen protectors that covered the underscreen Face ID sensor.

=== Speaker issues ===
Shortly after the release of iOS 27.0.1, some iPhone 18 Pro users reported crackling sound or popping during app use, which appears to be software related.

=== Cellular issues ===
Shortly after launch, in September 2026, some iPhone 18 Pro Max users in the United States reported issues when they were not able to connect to the AT&T network for phone calls, text messages, or data. A few days later, AT&T sent a text message to affected users stating that they should update to iOS 27.0.1, which did not solve the issue. AT&T then said it is "working with Apple" to resolve these problems. On October 3, 2026, Apple said that the problem was hardware-related. Since affected iPhone 18 Pro Max devices cannot be repaired, users should have them fully replaced.

== Notes ==
Preceded by iPhone 17 Pro / 17 Pro Max	iPhone; 20th generation alongside iPhone Duo	Succeeded by Most recent
