= IPhone Duo =

2026 foldable smartphone by Apple

iPhone Duo

- Developer: Apple
- Type: Foldable smartphone
- Series: iPhone
- First released: October 23, 2026; 30 days ago
- Availability by region: October 23, 2026; 30 days ago
- Related: iPhone 18 Pro and 18 Pro Max
- Compatible networks: 2G GSM/EDGE, 3G UMTS/HSPA+, 4G LTE, 5G NR/5G-A
- Form factor: Foldable (book-style)
- Colors: Night Sky; Star White
- Dimensions: 117.8 × 164.6 × 5.2 mm (4.64 × 6.48 × 0.20 in) (when unfolded); 117.8 × 84.1 × 11.3 mm (4.64 × 3.31 × 0.44 in) (when folded)
- Weight: 254 g (8.96 oz)
- Operating system: Original: iOS 27.1; Current: iOS 27.2.1, released November 9, 2026
- System-on-chip: Apple A20 Pro
- CPU: 6-core CPU (2 performance cores, 4 efficiency cores)
- GPU: 7-core GPU
- Modem: Apple C2
- Memory: 12 GB RAM
- Storage: 256 GB, 512 GB, 1 TB or 2 TB NVMe
- Battery: 4,883 mAh
- Charging: MagSafe and Qi 2 wireless; USB-C fast-charge; Up to 50% charge in 20 minutes with 60 W adaptor or higher
- Rear camera: 48 MP Fusion Main camera; 48 MP Fusion Ultra Wide; 2x optical-quality telephoto; 4K 120 fps video; 4K Dolby Vision HDR
- Front camera: 12 MP Center Stage front camera, under-display camera
- Display: Foldable 7.6-inch Super Retina XDR inner display, nano-texture finish; 5.4-inch outer display
- Sound: Stereo speakers, spatial audio
- Connectivity: Wi-Fi 7 tri-band, Bluetooth 6.0 (A2DP, LE), Ultra-wideband, Thread, NFC (reader mode, Express Cards), LEO satellite (Globalstar, limited), USB-C (USB 10Gbps), Dual-frequency GPS (L1, L5), GLONASS, Galileo, QZSS, BeiDou, NavIC
- Data inputs: Touch ID fingerprint scanner (side-mounted); Accelerometer; Gyro; Proximity; Compass; Barometer
- Water resistance: IP68 dust/water resistant (up to 6 m for 30 minutes)
- Made in: China
- Other: Emergency SOS, Messages and Find My via satellite, FaceTime Audio or Video at 1080p over Wi-Fi and 5G, Voice over 5G Standalone (if supported by the carrier)
- Website: apple.com/iphone-duo

The iPhone Duo supports multiple modes depending on the way the phone is folded.

The iPhone Duo is the first foldable smartphone by Apple. The device was announced during an Apple event at Apple Park in Cupertino, California, on September 9, 2026, alongside the iPhone 18 Pro and iPhone 18 Pro Max, and was released on October 23, 2026.

== Overview ==
Apple began filing patents for a foldable iPhone display as early as 2011; a patent for a gesture-controlled flexible display was awarded in January 2015.

In 2020, then-CEO Tim Cook became convinced that Apple needed to enter the foldable phone market after witnessing their growing popularity in Asian consumers using devices from Samsung and Huawei.

In early July 2026, Apple reportedly placed orders for 10 million of the foldable iPhones, and mass production of the phone and other components began shortly after. Multiple reports suggested that the foldable iPhone suffered early production hurdles and final mass-production adjustments, and in September 2026, reports confirmed that foldable iPhone production was ramping up slowly with only a few hundred units a day by late August.

Apple CEO John Ternus unveiled the iPhone Duo on September 9, 2026. It was released on October 23, 2026, in about 70 countries and regions, while pre-orders began on October 16, 2026. It was launched in 28 additional countries and regions on October 30, 2026. On October 16, 2026, Apple said the demand for the iPhone Duo was "nothing short of extraordinary" after seeing shipping estimates slip to early 2027 within minutes of opening pre-orders.

The 2026 production target was six to eight million units; production issues came as yield rates were only about 60%, and other suppliers, such as Samsung Display, were also struggling with output. Several suppliers told Apple to decide whether to prioritize production or yield rates.

In October 2026, due to very high demand, Apple notified suppliers that it increased the first year's production target by 44%, from 9.7 million units to 14 million units.

== Design ==
The iPhone Duo features a titanium frame and two displays. When closed, the device's external display allows it to be used as a conventional smartphone. When opened, the foldable internal display provides a larger workspace, similar to that of an iPad Mini. The phone uses Ceramic Shield 2 protection on the front of the display and Ceramic Shield on the back of the device, and it has an IP68 dust- and water-resistance rating. The foldable display can be used in different positions, and iOS adapts the interface depending on whether the display is fully open, partially folded, or closed. The side button has Touch ID for authentication.

The iPhone Duo comes in Night Sky and Star White colors.

== Specifications ==
=== Chipset ===
The iPhone Duo uses the Apple A20 Pro system-on-chip. The chip is manufactured using a 2 nm process and is paired with a vapor-chamber cooling system. According to Apple, the A20 Pro provides increased performance and efficiency for graphics processing, artificial intelligence, and other workloads.

=== Display ===
The Duo design features a 5.4 in (140 mm) outer display and a 7.6" (193mm) inner display when unfolded. The device uses a book-style folding design, with the inner display providing a larger viewing area when the device is opened. The two displays have a consistent aspect ratio of 1.41:1, allowing content to transition between the folded and unfolded configurations. When unfolded, it features the largest display in an iPhone to date.

Opening and closing the iPhone Duo

Both displays support ProMotion and have an outdoor peak brightness of up to 3,000 nits. The inside display incorporates a camera beneath the screen and a replaceable nano-texture coating to minimize creases and reflections.

=== Camera ===
Video can be captured in up to 4K at 120 fps. An under-screen camera in the inner display was developed for FaceTime video calls, allowing for multi-camera use during calls.

Camera features include "Smart Take", which takes photos automatically when a certain pose is detected, and "Kid Cue", a feature that displays animations on the outer screen to attract kids' attention.

=== Connectivity ===
The iPhone Duo uses Apple's C2 cellular modem. The device also includes Apple's N1 wireless networking chip, which supports Wi-Fi 7, Bluetooth 6, and Thread.

=== Battery ===
The iPhone Duo uses a dual-battery system designed around its folding form factor. Apple states that the device provides up to 24 hours of battery life with mixed use of the two displays. The battery can charge to 50 percent in approximately 20 minutes using a compatible fast charger.

=== Software ===
The iPhone Duo was shipped with iOS 27.1 on release.

To accommodate the iPhone Duo's folding form factor, Apple made changes to the user interface, with elements inspired by the iPad. Side-by-side multitasking, which was previously exclusive to the iPad, was brought over to the iPhone Duo, making it possible to run multiple apps at once. The dock, status icons, and app controls are moved to the right side of the phone to maximize vertical screen real estate. The software adapts to the orientation and the hinge angle, such as displaying a keyboard on one of the screens when it is partially folded and is sitting flat, or entering standby mode when the device is set down, even when it is not charging, with faces designed for the iPhone Duo.

The iOS 27.1 software development kit includes APIs for apps to adapt to the iPhone Duo's form factor. Apps that are built with the iOS 27.0 SDK rather than iOS 27.1 or later will have a blank space on the right side of the screen which houses the status icons. Apps that are built with the iOS 26 SDK or earlier will still have a blank space on the right side of the outer display, but they will be pillarboxed on the inner display with black bars on the left and right sides.

iPhone Duo devices bought from American Apple Stores can be customized to display the buyer's name on first boot.

=== Accessories ===
The iPhone Duo supports the Apple Pencil (USB-C) since iOS 27.2. It is the first iPhone to support the Apple Pencil, contrary to Steve Jobs' rejection of styluses on smartphones 19 years earlier.

== Issues ==
=== Early unoptimization ===
Before its release, tech reviewers with review units of the iPhone Duo given by Apple reported that unoptimized third party apps for the Duo's form factor feature a "tiny phone" centered window in the inner display with "huge black bars" surrounding it, while the outer display features a black bar on the right side of the screen. CNN identified Google Maps, Gmail, Call of Duty: Mobile and Uber.

Apple stated on its Developer website that third-party apps featuring these problems are built on the iOS 26 (or earlier) and iOS 27.0 SDK, and they need to be updated with the iOS 27.1 SDK.

=== Inner display cracking (Crackgate) ===
Shortly after release, reports of the iPhone Duo's inner display producing white lines extending across the screen began to surface. The issue came to be known among users and the media as "Crackgate".

The display failing is accompanied by an audible cracking sound while opening or closing the phone, and the broken display always occurs on the right-hand side about one centimetre (0.39 in) below halfway down; some owners reported the display breaking after a few hours of use. The phone has an accordion-like cable and a hinge piece at the centerfold where the display breaks, which is also close to where the cable connects to the battery.

A South Korean YouTuber dissected the phone and discovered that this hinge piece, which is part of a complex gear-based mechanism, is particularly weak and can break easily. A Polish YouTuber conducted a test involving opening and closing the screen by hand which resulted in a white line across the fold after 75,001 folds. The phone had been placed in a bowl of ice prior to the final fold, then developed the line when set down on a table.

== See also ==
- History of the iPhone
- List of iPhone models
- Timeline of iPhone models
- Timeline of iOS devices

Preceded by First	iPhone; 20th generation alongside iPhone 18 Pro / 18 Pro Max	Succeeded by Most recent
