= IPhone 6 =

2014 smartphone by Apple

iPhone 6 iPhone 6 Plus

- iPhone 6 in Space Gray
- Developer: Apple
- Manufacturers: Foxconn, Pegatron (on contract)
- Type: Smartphone
- Series: iPhone
- First released: September 19, 2014; 12 years ago
- Availability by region: September 19, 2014: United States; United Kingdom; Canada; France; Germany; Australia; Hong Kong; Singapore; Japan; Puerto Rico; Nigeria; September 26, 2014: Austria; Belgium; Denmark; Finland; Georgia; Ireland; Isle of Man; Italy; Liechtenstein; Luxembourg; Nepal; Netherlands; New Zealand; Norway; Portugal; Qatar; Russia; Saudi Arabia; Spain; Sweden; Switzerland; Tajikistan; Taiwan; Turkey; United Arab Emirates; October 17, 2014: China; India; Monaco; October 23, 2014: Israel; Tanzania; October 24, 2014: Czech Republic; French West Indies; Greenland; Kenya; Malta; Poland; Reunion Island; South Africa; October 30, 2014: Bahrain; Kuwait; October 31, 2014: Albania; Bosnia; Croatia; Egypt; Estonia; Greece; Guam; Hungary; Iceland; Kosovo; Latvia; Lithuania; Macau; Mexico; Moldova; Montenegro; North Macedonia; Palestinian territories; Romania; Serbia; Slovakia; Slovenia; South Korea; Thailand; Ukraine; November 6, 2014: Brunei; Malaysia; November 14, 2014: Argentina; Brazil; Chile; Colombia; Lebanon; Philippines; Vietnam; February 6, 2015: Indonesia; Mauritius
- Discontinued: September 7, 2016; 10 years ago (except India and United States); September 12, 2018; 8 years ago (United States and India)
- Units sold: 4 million+ on first day; 13 million in opening weekend; 220 million+ total
- Predecessor: iPhone 5s
- Successor: iPhone 6s / iPhone 6s Plus
- Compatible networks: GSM, CDMA, 3G, EVDO, HSPA+, 4G, LTE
- Form factor: Slate
- Dimensions: 6: 138.1 × 67.0 × 6.9 mm (5.44 × 2.64 × 0.27 in); 6 Plus: 158.1 × 77.8 × 7.1 mm (6.22 × 3.06 × 0.28 in)
- Weight: 6: 129 g (4.6 oz); 6 Plus: 172 g (6.1 oz)
- Operating system: Original: iOS 8.0; Current: iOS 12.5.8; Unofficial: iOS 13
- System-on-chip: Apple A8
- Memory: 1 GB LPDDR3 RAM
- Storage: 16, 32 (iPhone 6 only), 64, 128 GB eMMC
- Battery: 6: 3.82 V 6.91 W·h (1,810 mA·h) lithium polymer battery 6 Plus: 3.82 V 11.1 W·h (2,915 mA·h) lithium polymer battery
- Rear camera: 6: 8 MP (3264×2448 px max), True Tone flash, f/2.2 aperture, 1080p HD video recording (30 fps or 60 fps), slow-motion video (720p 120 fps or 240 fps)
- Front camera: 1.2 MP (1280×960 px max), 720p video recording (30 fps), f/2.2 aperture
- Display: 6: 4.7 in (120 mm) Retina HD: LED-backlit IPS LCD, 1334×750 px resolution (326 ppi) (128 px/cm) pixel density, 16:9 aspect ratio, 1400:1 typ. contrast ratio 6 Plus: 5.5 in (140 mm) Retina HD: LED-backlit IPS LCD 1920×1080 (401 ppi) (158 px/cm) pixel density, 16:9 aspect ratio, 1300:1 typ. contrast ratio All models: 500 cd/m² max. brightness (typical), with dual-ion exchange-strengthened glass
- Sound: Mono speaker, 3.5 mm stereo audio jack
- Connectivity: All models: UMTS/HSPA+/DC-HSDPA (850, 900, 1700/2100, 1900, 2100 MHz), CDMA EV-DO Rev. A and Rev. B (800, 1700/2100, 1900, 2100 MHz), GSM/EDGE (850, 900, 1800, 1900 MHz), Wi-Fi (802.11 a/b/g/n/ac) (802.11n: 2.4 and 5 GHz), Bluetooth 4.2, NFC, GPS & GLONASS, Lightning connector; models A1549 & A1522: LTE (bands 1 to 5, 7, 8, 13, 17 to 20, 25, 26, 28, 29); models A1586 & A1524: LTE (bands 1 to 5, 7, 8, 13, 17 to 20, 25, 26, 28, 29, 38 to 41), TD-SCDMA 1900 (F), 2000 (A)
- Data inputs: Multi-touch touchscreen display, triple microphone, Apple M8 motion coprocessor, 3-axis gyroscope, 3-axis accelerometer, digital compass, iBeacon, proximity sensor, ambient light sensor, Touch ID fingerprint reader, barometer
- Hearing aid compatibility: M3, T4
- Made in: China
- Other: FaceTime audio- or video-calling, Voice over LTE
- Website: Apple – iPhone 6 at the Wayback Machine (archived December 2, 2014)

The iPhone 6 and iPhone 6 Plus are smartphones that were developed and marketed by Apple. They are the eighth generation of the iPhone, succeeding the iPhone 5, iPhone 5c and iPhone 5s, and were released on September 19, 2014. The iPhone 6 and 6 Plus respectively include larger 4.7-inch and 5.5-inch displays, a faster processor, upgraded cameras, improved LTE and Wi-Fi connectivity and support for a near-field communications-based mobile payments offering. The iPhone 6 and iPhone 6 Plus were replaced as the flagship devices of the iPhone series by the iPhone 6s and iPhone 6s Plus on September 9, 2015.

The iPhone 6 and 6 Plus received positive reviews, with critics regarding their redesign, specifications, camera, price point, and battery life as improvements over previous iPhone models. However, aspects of their design were criticized, including plastic strips on the rear of the device for its antenna that disrupted the otherwise metal exterior, and the screen resolution of the standard-sized iPhone 6 being lower than other devices in its class. The iPhone 6 sold extremely well, becoming the best-selling iPhone model and the most successful smartphone to date. The iPhone 6 and 6 Plus supported iOS 8, 9, 10, 11 and 12 before being dropped by iOS 13.

The phones have been the subject of several hardware issues, including being susceptible to bending under hard pressure (dubbed Bendgate), and as a byproduct of this lack of rigidity, the touchscreen's internal hardware being susceptible to losing its connection to the phone's logic board. Additionally, some iPhone 6 Plus models were the subject of camera issues, including some with malfunctioning optical image stabilization or other defects on rear cameras.

The iPhone 6 and 6 Plus were moved to the mid-range spot in Apple's iPhone lineup when the iPhone 6S and 6S Plus were released in September 2015. The iPhone 6 and 6 Plus were discontinued in most markets on September 7, 2016, when Apple announced the iPhone 7 and iPhone 7 Plus. Their spot as the entry-level iPhone was taken by the first-generation iPhone SE, released on March 31, 2016. The iPhone 6 was relaunched with 32 GB of storage in 2017 as a budget/mid-range iPhone.

== History ==
From the launch of the original iPhone to the iPhone 4s, iPhones used 3.5-inch displays — which are smaller than screens used by flagship phones from competitors. The iPhone 5 and its immediate successors featured a display that was taller, but the same width as prior models, measuring at 4 inches diagonally. Following Apple's loss in smartphone market share to companies producing phones with larger displays, reports as early as January 2014 suggested Apple was preparing to launch new iPhone models with larger, 4.7-inch and 5.5-inch displays. Reports prior to its unveiling also speculated Apple might use a new iPhone model to introduce a mobile payments platform using near-field communications—a technology that was incorporated into many Android phones, but had experienced a low adoption rate among users.

The iPhone 6 and iPhone 6 Plus were officially unveiled during a press event at the Flint Center for Performing Arts in Cupertino, California on September 9, 2014, and released on September 19, 2014; pre-orders began on September 12, 2014, with the iPhone 6 starting at US$199 and the iPhone 6 Plus starting at US$299. In China, where the iPhone 5c and 5s were the first models in the iPhone series to be released in the country on the same day as their international launch, Apple notified local wireless carriers it would be unable to release the iPhone 6 and iPhone 6 Plus on the 19th there were "details which are not ready"; local media reported the devices had not yet been approved by the Ministry of Industry and Information Technology, and earlier in the year, a news report by state broadcaster China Central Television alleged iPhone devices were a threat to national security because iOS 7's "frequent locations" function could expose "state secrets."

In August 2015, Apple initiated a replacement program for some early iPhone 6 Plus models that were found to have potentially faulty cameras that could be causing photos to appear blurry.

On September 9, 2015, with the release of the iPhone 6s and iPhone 6s Plus, the iPhone 6 and 6 Plus were moved to the mid-range of the iPhone lineup. The 128 GB versions of the iPhone 6 and iPhone 6 Plus were discontinued along with the gold version of both phones, but the 16 GB and 64 GB versions of the iPhone 6 and iPhone 6 Plus in silver and space gray remained available for sale at a reduced price.

In June 2016, Apple faced a potential sales ban in China, as Shenzhen Baili, a Chinese device maker, alleged the iPhone 6 and iPhone 6 Plus infringed on its design patent.

The iPhone 6 was temporarily discontinued on September 7, 2016, and the 6 Plus was permanently discontinued on same date, when Apple announced the iPhone 7 and iPhone 7 Plus; the role of entry-level iPhone had already been taken by the first-generation iPhone SE. As the iPhone SE has more powerful internal hardware than the midrange iPhone 6 (largely the same as the 6S) and had been released earlier on March 31, 2016, this created an unusual situation when it was sold alongside the iPhone 6 and 6 Plus until September 7 despite being marketed as a lower-tier iPhone.

In February 2017, the iPhone 6 was quietly relaunched in carrier stores and online, with 32 GB storage. This version was released first in Asia, then in Europe in the following months, the United States in May, and Canada in July 2017.

== Specifications ==
=== Hardware ===
==== Design ====
The design of the iPhone 6 and iPhone 6 Plus is influenced by that of the iPad Air with a glass front that is curved around the edges of the display, and an aluminum rear that contains two plastic strips for the antenna. The back is built of 6000-series aluminum. The enclosure of the device is a single piece of aluminum that spans the back and sides. This results in rounded sides that are distinct from the flat sides seen on the iPhone 4 to iPhone 5s. Both models come in gold, silver, and "space gray" finishes. The iPhone 6 has a thickness of 6.9 millimetres (0.27 in), while the iPhone 6 Plus is 7.1 mm (0.28 in) in thickness; both are thinner than the iPhone 5c and iPhone 5s. The iPhone 6 was the thinnest iPhone produced by Apple until the iPhone Air (0.22 inches/5.64 mm) was released in 2025.

iPhone 6 / iPhone 6 Plus color options
Color	Name	Front	Antenna
	Space Gray	Black	Light Grey
	Silver	White	Light Grey
	Gold	White	White

==== Displays ====
The most significant changes to the iPhone 6 and iPhone 6 Plus are its displays; both branded as "Retina HD displays" and "ion-strengthened", the iPhone 6 display is 4.7 inches in size with a 16:9 resolution of 1334x750 (326 ppi, minus one row of pixels), while the iPhone 6 Plus includes a 5.5-inch 1920x1080 (1080p) display (401 PPI). The displays use a multiple-domain LCD panel, dubbed "dual-domain pixels"; the RGB pixels themselves are skewed in a pattern so every pixel is seen from a different angle. This technique helps improve the viewing angles of the display.

To accommodate the larger physical size of the iPhone 6 and iPhone 6 Plus, the top button was renamed to "side button" and moved to the side of the phone instead of the top to improve its accessibility.

==== Batteries ====
The iPhone 6 features a 6.91 Wh (1,810 mAh) battery, while the iPhone 6 Plus features an 11.1 Wh (2,915 mAh) battery, neither of which are user-replaceable.

==== Chipsets ====
Both models include an Apple A8 system-on-chip, and an M8 motion co-processor—an update of the M7 chip from the iPhone 5s. The primary difference between the M8 and the original M7 coprocessor is the M8 also includes a barometer to measure altitude changes. Phil Schiller said the A8 chip would provide, in comparison to the 5s, a 25% increase in CPU performance, a 50% increase in graphics performance, and less heat output. Early hands-on reports said the A8's GPU performance might indeed break away from previous generations doubling of performance at each yearly release, scoring 21204.26 in Base mark X compared to 20253.80, 10973.36 and 5034.75 on respectively the 5s, 5 and 4s.

==== Connectivity ====
The expanded LTE connectivity on the iPhone 6 and iPhone 6 Plus is improved to LTE Advanced, with support for over 20 LTE bands (seven more than the iPhone 5s), for up to 150 Mbit/s download speed, and VoLTE support. Wi-Fi performance has been improved with support for 802.11ac specifications, providing speeds up to 433.0581 Mbit/s—which is up to three times faster than 802.11n, along with Wi-Fi Calling support where available. The iPhone 6 and iPhone 6 Plus adds support for near-field communications (NFC). It is initially used exclusively for Apple Pay — a new mobile payments system which allows users to store their credit cards in Passbook for use with online payments and retail purchases over NFC. iOS 11 added limited use of near-field communications besides Apple Pay for third party apps.

==== Camera ====
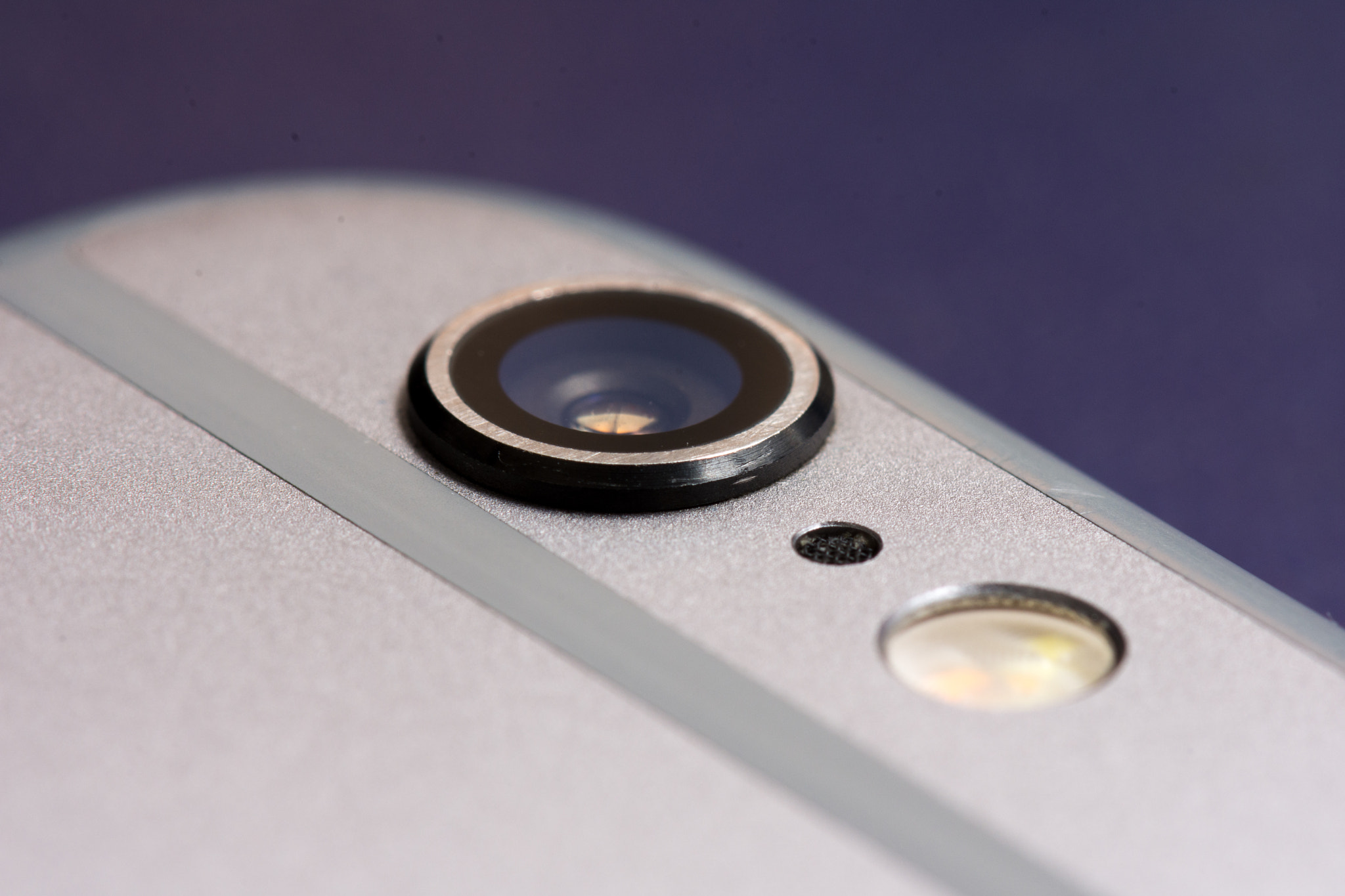
iPhone 6 camera module

The iPhone 6's rear-facing camera now has the ability to shoot 1080p Full HD video at either 30 or 60 frames per second and 720p HD slow-motion video at either 120 or 240 frames per second, while the iPhone 5s could only record at 30 and 120 frames per second respectively. Unlike the previous models, the rear-facing camera is not flush with the rear of the device, but instead protrudes slightly.

Still photos can be captured during video recording. Those have a resolution of four megapixels (2720×1532).

The camera also includes phase detection autofocus. The iPhone 6 Plus camera is nearly identical, but also includes optical image stabilization. The front-facing camera was also updated with a new sensor and f/2.2 aperture, along with support for burst and HDR modes.

However, the optical image stabilization of the iPhone 6 Plus is only available for photography and deactivated during video recording.

The front camera has 1.3 megapixels and can record video up to 720p at 30 frames per second.

==== Sensors ====
The iPhone 6 and 6 Plus are the first iPhones to be equipped with a barometer sensor.

Like the predecessor, the iPhone 6 and 6 Plus are equipped with an accelerometer, gyroscope, front-facing proximity sensor and a digital compass.

=== Software ===
When first released, the iPhone 6 and iPhone 6 Plus were supplied pre-loaded with iOS 8. Apps are able to take advantage of the increased screen size in the iPhone 6 and 6 Plus to display more information on-screen; for example, the Mail app uses a dual-pane layout similar to its iPad version when the device is in landscape mode on the iPhone 6 Plus. As it uses an identical aspect ratio, apps designed for the iPhone 5, iPhone 5c, and 5s can be upscaled for use on the iPhone 6 and 6 Plus. To improve the usability of the devices' larger screens, an additional "Reachability" gesture was added; double-tapping the Home button will slide the top half of the screen's contents down to the bottom half of the screen. This function allows users to reach buttons located near the top of the screen, such as a "Back" button in the top-left corner. Tapping it once resets the screen timeout so the user does not have to look at the screen for an empty spot to tap on.

In June 2019, Apple announced that it would drop support for the iPhone 6 and 6 Plus with the release of iOS 13.

== Reception ==
Both iPhone 6 models received positive reviews. Re/code called it "the best smartphone you can buy". TechRadar praised the iPhone 6's "brilliant" design, improved battery life over the 5s, iOS 8 for being "smarter and more intuitive than ever", along with the quality of its camera. However, the plastic antenna strips on the rear of the phone were criticized for resulting in poor aesthetics, the display for having lower resolution and pixel density in comparison to other recent smartphones – including those with the same physical screen size as the iPhone 6, such as the HTC One, and for not having a sufficient justification for its significantly higher price in comparison to similar devices running Android or Windows Phone. The Verge considered the iPhone 6 to be "simply and cleanly designed" in comparison to the 5s, noting the phone still felt usable despite its larger size, but criticized the antenna plastic, the protruding camera lens (which prevents the device from sitting flat without a case), and the lack of additional optimization in the operating system for the bigger screen. Improvements such as performance, battery life, VoLTE support, and other tweaks were also noted. In conclusion, the iPhone 6 was considered "good, even great, but there's little about it that's truly ambitious or truly moving the needle. It's just a refinement of a lot of existing ideas into a much more pleasant package".

In regards to the 6 Plus, Engadget panned its design for being uncomfortable to hold and harder to grip in comparison to other devices such as the Galaxy Note 3 and LG G3, but praised its inclusion of optical image stabilization and slightly better battery life than the 6.

The iPhone 6 and 6 Plus have been criticized by Forbes Magazine for the lack of 2160p (3840×2160 pixels) video recording due to the insufficient image sensor resolution of 3264×2448 pixels. However, third-party software is able to record footage at 3264×1836 pixels upscaled to 3840×2160p.

== Issues ==
The iPhone 6 and 6 Plus were affected by a number of notable hardware-related issues, including but not limited to concerns surrounding their rigidity (which led to incidents surrounding chassis bending, as well as degradation or outright loss of touchscreen functionality), performance issues on models with larger storage capacity, camera problems on the 6 Plus model, as well as an initially undocumented "error 53" that appeared under certain circumstances.

=== Bendgate (chassis bending) ===
Shortly after its public release, it was reported the iPhone 6 and iPhone 6 Plus chassis was susceptible to bending under pressure, such as when carried tightly in a user's pocket. While such issues are not exclusive to the iPhone 6 and 6 Plus, the design flaw came to be known among users and the media as "Bendgate".

Apple responded to the bending allegations, stating they had only received nine complaints of bent devices and that the damage occurring due to regular use is "extremely rare." The company maintained the iPhone 6 and 6 Plus went through durability testing to ensure they would stand up to daily use. The company offered to replace phones that were bent if it is determined the bending was unintentional.

In May 2018, as part of a lawsuit against Apple regarding touchscreen failure, it was revealed via internal documents that Apple knew the iPhone 6 and 6 Plus phones were more likely to bend than previous models. According to the court documents, Apple's internal tests found the iPhone 6 was 3.3 times more likely to bend than the iPhone 5s, while the larger iPhone 6 Plus was 7.2 times more likely to bend.

=== Hair ripping ===
On October 3, 2014 9to5Mac released a post claiming certain iPhone 6 and iPhone 6 Plus users complained on social networking sites the phone ripped off their hair when they held the phone close to their ears when making phone calls. Twitter users claimed the seam between the glass screen and aluminum back of the iPhone 6 was to blame, with hair becoming caught within it.

=== Flash storage performance ===
Some users reported the 64 and 128 GB iPhone 6 models had experienced performance issues, and that some 128 GB iPhone 6 Plus models would, in rare cases, randomly crash and reboot. Business Korea reported the issues were connected to the triple-level cell NAND storage of the affected models. Triple-level NAND flash can store three bits of data per cell of flash, and are cheaper than dual-level cell solutions, but at the cost of performance. It was reported Apple had planned to switch the affected model lines back to multi-level cell flash, and address the performance issues on existing devices in a future iOS update.

=== Faulty OIS and metal interference ===
It was reported that the optical image stabilization (OIS) systems on some iPhone 6 Plus models were faulty, failing to properly stabilize when the phone is being held perfectly still, leading to blurry photos and "wavy"-looking videos. The optical image stabilization system on particularly the Plus models, as well as Near-field communication (NFC) on all iPhone 6 models were also found to be vulnerable to disruption by accessories that use magnets. Apple issued advisories to users and its licensed accessory makers, warning magnetic or metallic accessories can cause problems with the aforementioned functionalities.

On August 21, 2015, Apple instituted a repair program for iPhone 6 Plus models released between September 2014 and January 2015, citing faulty rear cameras on affected models may produce blurry pictures.

Some iPhone 6 and iPhone 6 Plus models have an issue in which the front-facing camera is somehow "shifted", or out of place. Apple stated they would replace most affected iPhone 6 models with this issue, free of charge. Despite numerous complaints regarding this issue, it does not seem to affect the camera itself. It is said the camera is not what has shifted, but a piece of protective foam around the camera module itself that has gone out of place.

=== "Error 53" ===
If the iPhone 6 home button is repaired or modified by a third party, the device will fail security checks related to Touch ID as the components have not been "re-validated" for security reasons—a process that can only be performed by an authorized Apple outlet. Failing these checks disables all features related to Touch ID. Such effects have sometimes happened as a result of damage as well.

It was reported these same hardware integrity checks would trigger an unrecoverable loop into "Recovery Mode" if iOS is updated or restored, with attempts to restore the device via iTunes software resulting in an "error 53" message. Beyond the explanation this is related to hardware integrity errors regarding Touch ID components, Apple provided no official explanation of what specifically triggers error 53 or how it can be fixed without replacing the entire device.

On February 18, 2016, Apple released an iOS 9.2.1 patch through iTunes which addresses this issue and admitted error 53 was actually related to a diagnostic check for inspecting the Touch ID hardware before an iPhone is shipped from its factories.

=== Touchscreen failure ("touch disease") ===
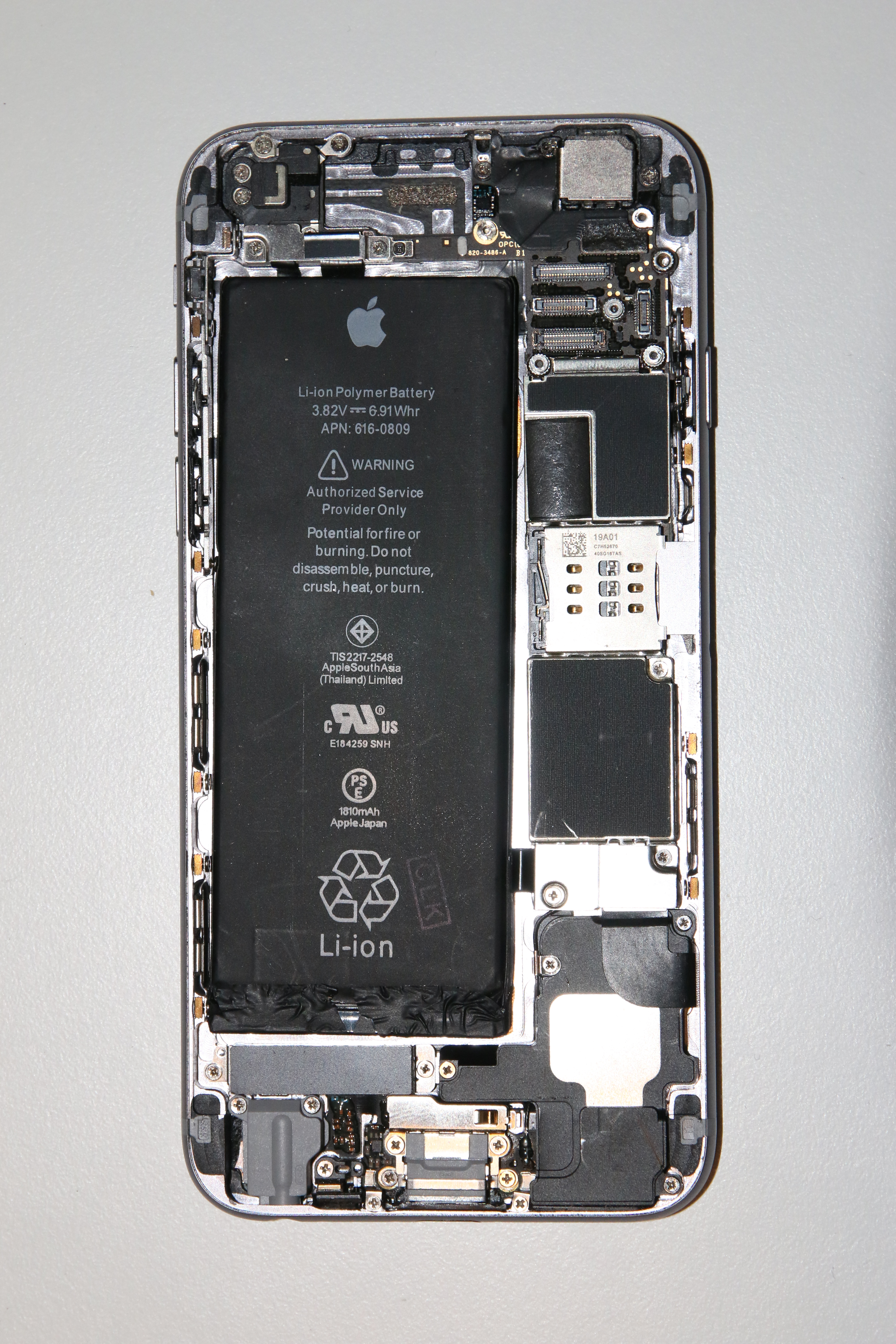
An iPhone 6 with its display removed

Touchscreen control components on iPhone 6 logic boards have insufficient support, including a lack of underfill—which strengthens and stabilizes integrated circuits, and a lack of rigid metal shielding on the logic board unlike previous iPhone models; the touchscreen controller is instead shielded by a flexible "sticker". Normal use of the device can cause the logic board to flex internally, which strains the touchscreen IC connectors and leads to a degradation or outright loss of touchscreen functionality. A symptom that has been associated with this type of failure is a flickering grey bar near the top of the display. iFixit reported this issue, nicknamed "touch disease", was a byproduct of the previous "Bendgate" design flaw because of the device's demonstrated lack of rigidity. As such, the larger iPhone 6 Plus is more susceptible to the flaw; however, it has also been reported on a small percentage of iPhone 6 models. The devices' successor, the iPhone 6s, is not afflicted by this flaw due to changes to their internal design, which included the strengthening of "key points" in the rear casing, and the re-location of the touchscreen controllers to the display assembly from the logic board.

Initially, Apple did not officially acknowledge this issue. The issue was widely discussed on Apple's support forum—where posts discussing the issue have been subject to censorship. The touchscreen can be repaired via microsoldering: Apple Stores are not equipped with the tools needed to perform the logic board repair, which had led to affected users sending their devices to unofficial, third-party repair services. An Apple Store employee interviewed by Apple Insider reported six months after they first started noticing the problem, Apple had issued guidance instructing them to tell affected users this was a hardware issue that could not be repaired and that their iPhone had to be replaced. However, some in-stock units have also been afflicted with this issue out of the box, leading to an employee stating they were "tired of pulling service stock out of the box, and seeing the exact same problem the customer has on the replacement". The issue received mainstream attention in August 2016 when reported by iFixit. On August 26, 2016, Apple Insider reported based on data from four "high-traffic" Apple Store locations, there was a spike in the number of iPhone 6 devices brought into them for repairs following mainstream reports of the "touch disease" problem.

On August 30, 2016, a group of three iPhone 6 owners sued Apple Inc. in the United States District Court for the Northern District of California and filed for a proposed class action lawsuit, alleging Apple was engaging in unfair business practices by having "long been aware" of the defective design, yet refusing to acknowledge or repair it.

On November 17, 2016, Apple officially acknowledged the issue. The company also announced a paid repair program for affected iPhone 6 Plus models, stating; "some iPhone 6 Plus devices may exhibit display flickering or Multi-Touch issues after being dropped multiple times on a hard surface and then incurring further stress on the device".

== Sales ==
Apple Inc. announced, within 24 hours of availability, over 4 million pre-orders of the iPhone 6 and 6 Plus were made, exceeding the supply available—an Apple record. Ten million iPhone 6 and 6 Plus devices were sold in the first three days, another Apple record. Three months after its release, the iPhone 6 generated 71.5 million unit sales.

As of June 2017, the iPhone 6 and 6 Plus had sold an estimated 222 million units worldwide. This makes them the most popular iPhone models and the best-selling smartphones in history.

== See also ==
- List of iPhone models
- History of the iPhone
- List of best-selling mobile phones
- Timeline of iPhone models

Preceded by iPhone 5C / iPhone 5S	iPhone; 8th generation	Succeeded by iPhone 6S / 6S Plus
