= IPhone =

Line of smartphones by Apple

iPhone

- Front face of the iPhone 18 Pro in Burgundy
- Developer: Apple
- Manufacturer: Contract manufacturers: Foxconn; Pegatron; Wistron; Tata Group
- Type: Smartphone
- Released: June 29, 2007; 19 years ago
- Units sold: >3 billion (as of July 2025)
- Operating system: iOS
- Storage: 128, 256, 512 GB, 1 or 2 TB (Note: 1 GB = 1 billion bytes; 1 TB = 1 trillion bytes) flash memory (current models)
- Sound: Bluetooth; Stereo speaker (iPhone 7 and up); Microphone; 3.5 mm headphone jack (until iPhone 7); 30-pin dock connector (until iPhone 5); Lightning port (iPhone 5 – iPhone 14); USB-C port (iPhone 15 and up)
- Power: Built-in rechargeable lithium-ion battery
- Online services: App Store; Apple One; iCloud; Apple Pay
- Related: iPad; Comparison of iPhone models
- Website: apple.com/iphone

The iPhone is a line of smartphones developed and marketed by Apple since 2007. The first-generation iPhone was announced by then–Apple CEO and co-founder Steve Jobs on January 9, 2007, at Macworld 2007, and first launched in June 2007. Since then, Apple has annually released new iPhone models; the current lineup consists of the iPhone 17 and its predecessor iPhone 16, the lower-end iPhone 17e, the lighter and thinner iPhone Air, the more feature-rich iPhone 18 Pro and Pro Max, and the foldable iPhone Duo. As of July 2025, more than three billion iPhones have been sold. Apple has been the largest vendor of mobile phones since 2023.

The original iPhone was the first mobile phone to use multi-touch technology. Throughout its history, the iPhone has gained larger, higher-resolution Retina displays, video-recording functionality, waterproofing, and many accessibility features. Up to the iPhone 8 and 8 Plus, iPhones had a single button on the front panel, with the iPhone 5s and later integrating a Touch ID fingerprint sensor. Since the iPhone X, (Note: The naming of the iPhone X (Roman numeral "X" pronounced "ten") marked the 10th anniversary of the iPhone, thus skipping the iPhone 9.) models have switched to a nearly bezel-less front screen design with Face ID facial recognition in place of Touch ID for authentication, and increased use of gestures in place of the home button for navigation. (Note: Excluding the iPhone SE second and third generations, which still used the home button)

The iPhone, which operates using Apple's proprietary iOS operating system, is one of the two major smartphone platforms in the world, alongside Android. The first-generation iPhone was described by Steve Jobs as a "revolution" for the mobile phone industry. The iPhone has been credited with popularizing the slate smartphone form factor, and with creating a large market for smartphone apps, or "app economy", laying the foundation for the mobile-device market boom. In addition to the apps that come pre-installed on iOS, there are nearly two million apps available for download from Apple's mobile distribution marketplace, the App Store, as of August 2024.

== History ==
=== 2000s ===
Development of an Apple smartphone began in 2004, when the company began assembling a team of 1,000 employees led by hardware engineer Tony Fadell, software engineer Scott Forstall, and design officer Jony Ive, to work on the highly confidential "Project Purple".

Then-Apple CEO Steve Jobs steered the original focus away from a tablet (which was later revisited in the form of the iPad) toward a phone. Apple created the device during a secretive collaboration with Cingular Wireless (later renamed AT&T Mobility) at an estimated development cost of US$150 million over 30 months. According to Jobs in 1998, the "i" in "iMac" (and later "iPod", "iPhone", and "iPad") stands for internet, individual, instruct, inform, and inspire.

Apple rejected the "design by committee" approach that had yielded the Motorola ROKR E1, a largely unsuccessful "iTunes phone" made in collaboration with Motorola. Among other deficiencies, the ROKR E1's firmware limited storage to only 100 iTunes songs to avoid competing with Apple's iPod nano. Cingular gave Apple the freedom to develop the iPhone's hardware and software in-house, a rare practice at the time, and paid Apple a fraction of its monthly service revenue (until the iPhone 3G), in exchange for four years of exclusive U.S. sales, until 2011.

Jobs unveiled the first-generation iPhone to the public on January 9, 2007, at the Macworld 2007 convention at the Moscone Center in San Francisco. The iPhone incorporated a 3.5 in (89 mm) multi-touch display with only four total buttons and a ringer/silent switch, and ran the iPhone OS operating system with a touch-friendly interface, then marketed as a version of Mac OS X. It was the first mobile phone to use multi-touch technology. The device launched on June 29, 2007, at a starting price of US$499 in the United States, and required a two-year contract with AT&T. The price was reduced by a third after two months. The resulting complaints forced Jobs to issue an apology and offer a partial rebate to early purchasers of the iPhone.

Worldwide iPhone availability: iPhone available since its original release iPhone available since the release of the iPhone 3G

On July 11, 2008, at Apple's Worldwide Developers Conference (WWDC) 2008, Apple announced the iPhone 3G, and expanded its launch-day availability to 22 countries; it was eventually released in 70 countries and territories. The iPhone 3G introduced faster 3G connectivity, and a lower starting price of US$199 (with a two-year AT&T contract). The iPhone 3G was a commercial success, overtaking Motorola RAZR V3 as the best-selling cell phone in the U.S. by the end of 2008. Its successor, the iPhone 3GS, was announced on June 8, 2009, at WWDC 2009, and introduced video recording functionality.

=== 2010s ===
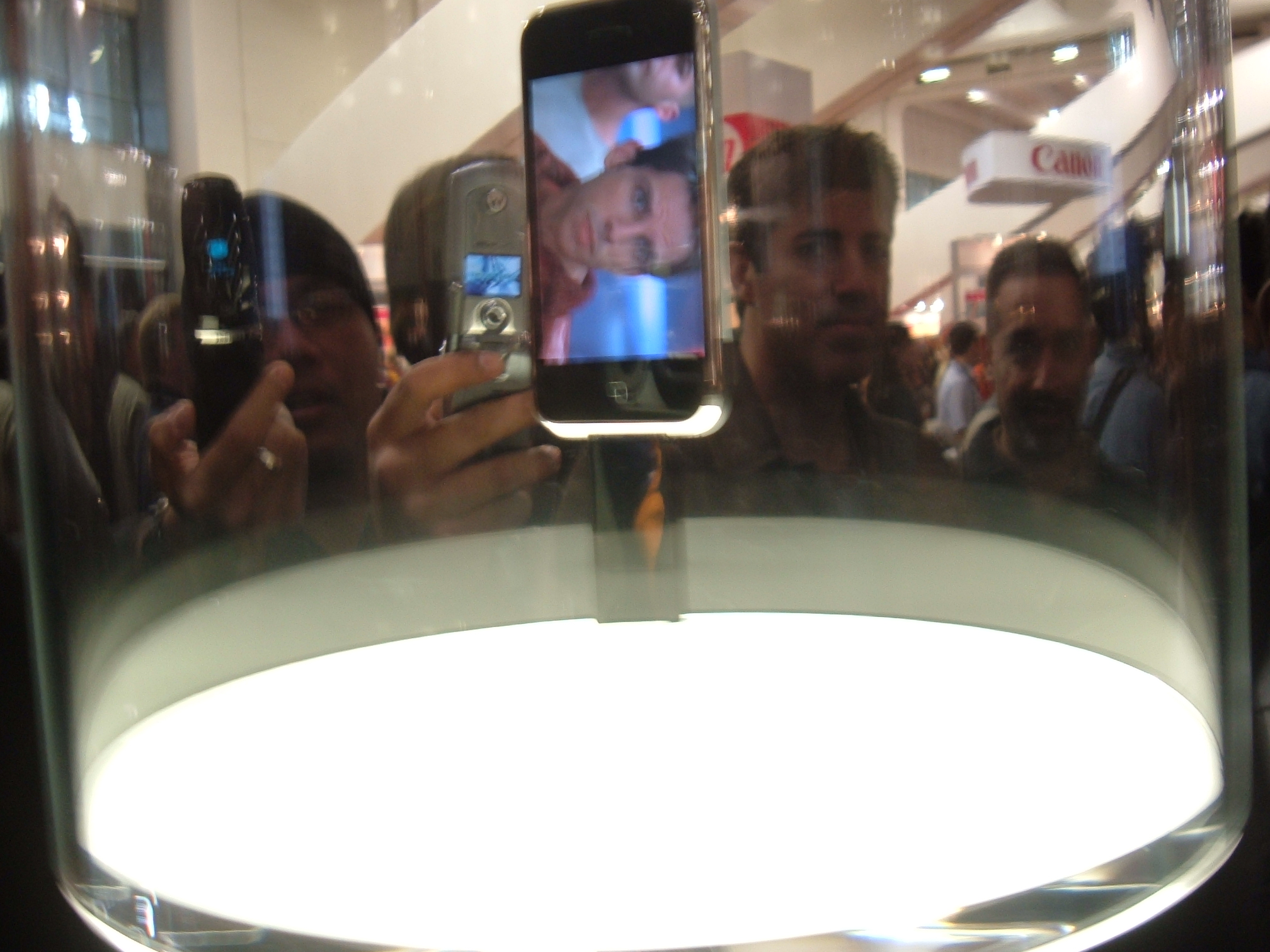
The original iPhone on display under glass at the January 2007 Macworld show

The iPhone 4 was announced on June 7, 2010, at WWDC 2010, and introduced a redesigned body incorporating a stainless steel frame and a rear glass panel. At release, the iPhone 4 was marketed as the "world's thinnest smartphone"; it uses the Apple A4 processor, being the first iPhone to use an Apple custom-designed chip. It introduced the Retina display, having four times the display resolution of preceding iPhones, and was the highest-resolution smartphone screen at release; a front-facing camera was also introduced, enabling video calling functionality via FaceTime.

Users of the iPhone 4 reported dropped/disconnected telephone calls when holding their phones in a certain way, and this issue was nicknamed "antennagate". In January 2011, as Apple's exclusivity agreement with AT&T was expiring, Verizon announced that they would be carrying the iPhone 4, with a model compatible with Verizon's CDMA network released on February 10.

The iPhone 4s was announced on October 4, 2011, and introduced the Siri virtual assistant, a dual-core A5 processor, and an 8-megapixel camera with 1080p video recording functionality. The iPhone 5 was announced on September 12, 2012, and introduced a larger 4 in (100 mm) screen, up from the 3.5 in (89 mm) screen of all previous iPhone models, as well as faster 4G LTE connectivity. It also introduced a thinner and lighter body made of aluminum alloy. The 30-pin dock connector of previous iPhones was replaced with the new, reversible Lightning connector.

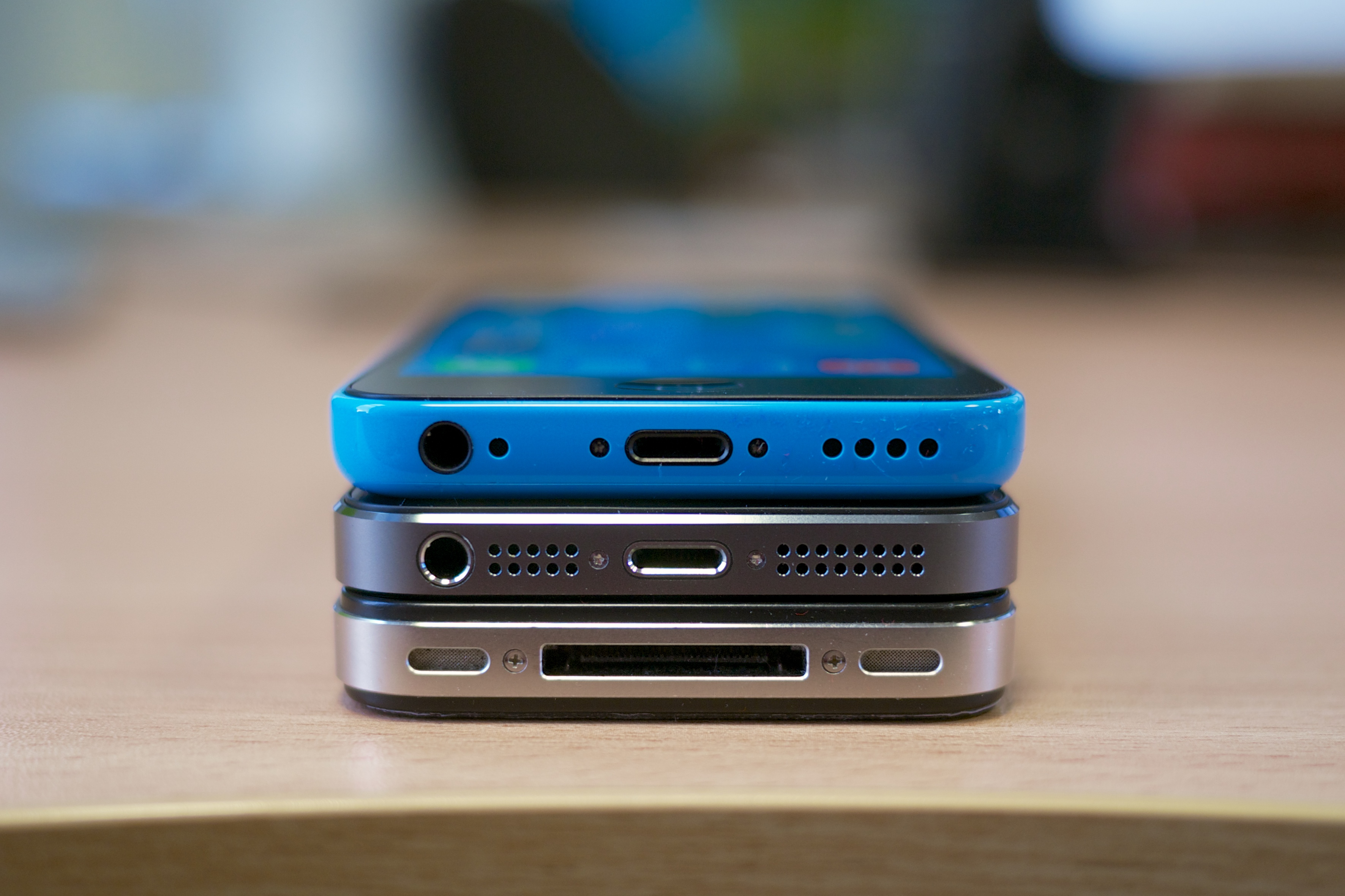
Bottom angle comparison between iPhone 5c (top), iPhone 5s (middle), and iPhone 4s (bottom)

The iPhone 5s and iPhone 5c were announced on September 10, 2013. The iPhone 5s included a 64-bit A7 processor, becoming the first ever 64-bit smartphone; it also introduced the Touch ID fingerprint authentication sensor. The iPhone 5c was a lower-cost device that incorporated hardware from the iPhone 5, into a series of colorful plastic frames.

On September 9, 2014, Apple introduced the iPhone 6 and iPhone 6 Plus, with significantly larger screens than the iPhone 5s, at 4.7 in (120 mm) and 5.5 in (140 mm), respectively; both models also introduced mobile payment technology via Apple Pay. Optical image stabilization was introduced to the 6 Plus' camera. The Apple Watch was also introduced on the same day and operates in conjunction with a connected iPhone. Some users experienced bending issues from normal use with the iPhone 6 and 6 Plus, particularly on the latter model; this issue was nicknamed "bendgate".

The iPhone 6s and 6s Plus were introduced on September 9, 2015, and included a more bend-resistant frame made of a stronger aluminum alloy, as well as a higher-resolution 12-megapixel main camera capable of 4K video recording. The first-generation iPhone SE was introduced on March 21, 2016, and was a low-cost device that incorporated newer hardware from the iPhone 6s, in the frame of the older iPhone 5s.

The iPhone 7 and 7 Plus were announced on September 7, 2016, which introduced larger camera sensors, IP67-certified water and dust resistance, and a quad-core A10 Fusion processor using big.LITTLE technology; the 3.5 mm headphone jack was removed, and Apple introduced the AirPods wireless earbuds. Optical image stabilization was added to the 7's camera. A second telephoto camera lens was added on the 7 Plus, enabling two-times optical zoom, and "Portrait" photography mode which simulates bokeh in photos.

The iPhone 8, 8 Plus, and iPhone X were announced on September 12, 2017, in Apple's first event held at the Steve Jobs Theater in Apple Park. All models featured rear glass panel designs akin to the iPhone 4, wireless charging, and a hexa-core A11 Bionic chip with "Neural Engine" AI accelerator hardware. The iPhone X additionally introduced a 5.8-inch OLED "Super Retina" display with a "bezel-less" design, with a higher pixel density and contrast ratio than previous iPhones with LCD displays, and introduced a stronger frame made of stainless steel. It also introduced Face ID facial recognition authentication hardware, in a "notch" screen cutout, in place of Touch ID; the home button was removed to achieve the “bezel-less” design, replacing it with a gesture-based navigation system. At its US$999 starting price, the iPhone X was the most expensive iPhone at launch.

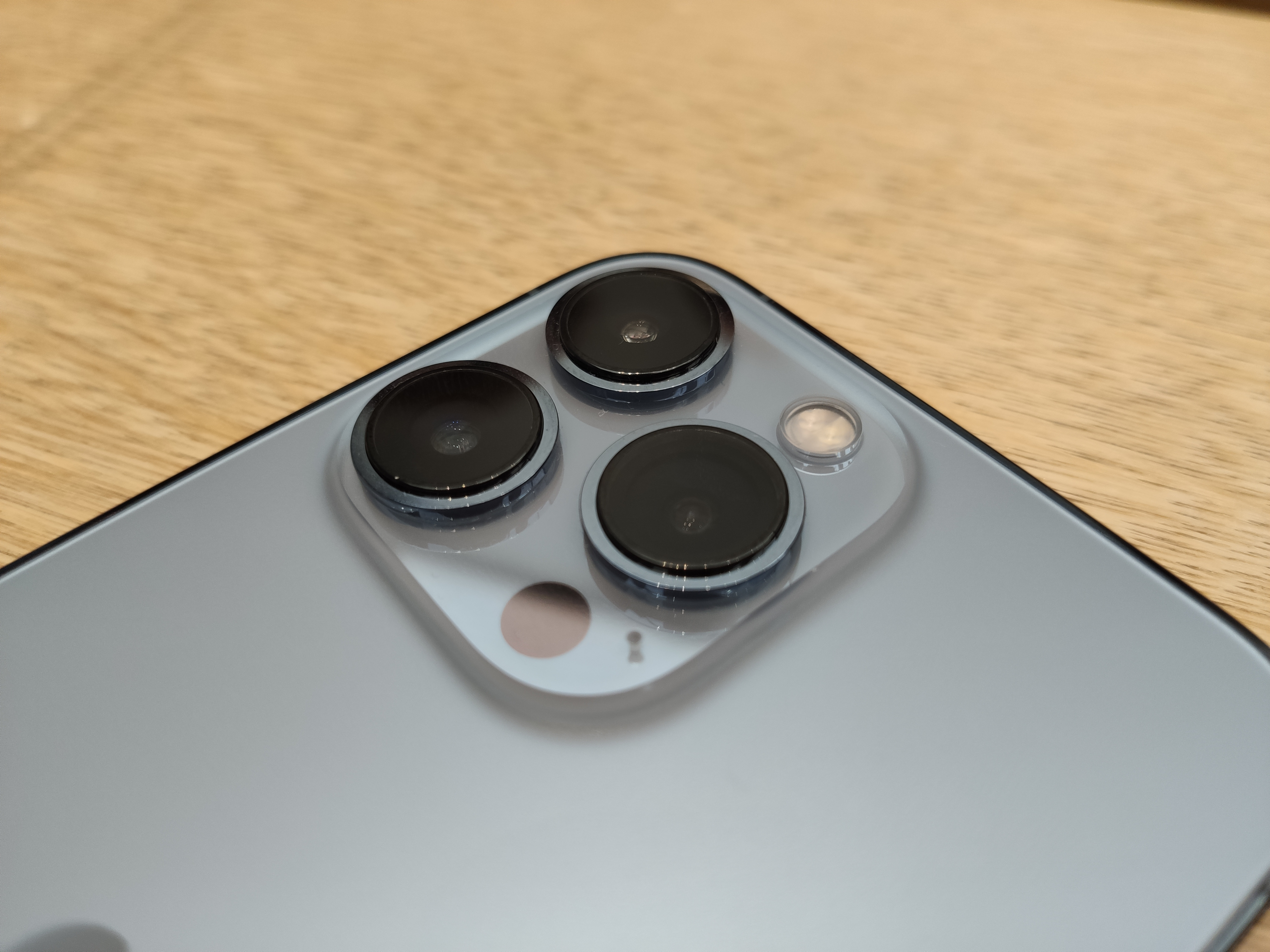
The cameras on the iPhone 13 Pro

The iPhone XR, iPhone XS, and XS Max were announced on September 12, 2018. All models featured the "Smart HDR" computational photography system, and a significantly more powerful "Neural Engine". The XS Max introduced a larger 6.5 in (170 mm) screen. The iPhone XR included a 6.5 in (170 mm) LCD "Liquid Retina" display, with a "bezel-less" design similar to the iPhone X, but did not include a second telephoto lens; it was made available in a series of vibrant colors, akin to the iPhone 5c, and was lower-cost than the iPhone X and XS.

The iPhone 11, 11 Pro, and 11 Pro Max were announced on September 10, 2019. The iPhone 11 was the successor to the iPhone XR, while the iPhone 11 Pro and 11 Pro Max succeeded the iPhone XS and XS Max. All models gained an ultra-wide lens, enabling two-times optical zoom out, as well as larger batteries for longer battery life. The second-generation iPhone SE was introduced on April 17, 2020, and was a low-cost device that incorporated newer hardware from the iPhone 11, in the frame of the older iPhone 8, while retaining the home button and the Touch ID sensor.

=== 2020s ===
The iPhone 12, 12 Mini, 12 Pro, and 12 Pro Max were announced during a livestream event on October 13, 2020. All models featured OLED "Super Retina XDR" displays, introduced faster 5G connectivity, and the MagSafe magnetic charging and accessory system; a slimmer flat-edged design was also introduced, and its stronger glass-ceramic front glass improved drop protection compared to previous iPhones. The iPhone 12 Mini introduced a smaller 5.4-inch screen, while the 12 Pro and 12 Pro Max had larger 6.1-inch and 6.7-inch screens, respectively. The iPhone 12 Pro and 12 Pro Max also added a Lidar sensor for better accuracy in augmented reality (AR) applications.

The iPhone 13, 13 Mini, 13 Pro, and 13 Pro Max were announced during a livestream event on September 14, 2021. All models featured larger camera sensors, larger batteries for longer battery life, and a narrower "notch" screen cutout. The iPhone 13 Pro and 13 Pro Max additionally introduced smoother adaptive 120 Hz refresh rate "ProMotion" technology in their OLED displays and three-times optical zoom in the telephoto lens. The low-cost third-generation iPhone SE was introduced on March 8, 2022, and incorporated the A15 Bionic chip from the iPhone 13, but otherwise retained similar hardware to the second-generation iPhone SE.

The iPhone 14, 14 Plus, 14 Pro, and 14 Pro Max were announced on September 7, 2022. All models introduced satellite phone emergency calling functionality. The new 14 Plus brought the large 6.7-inch screen size, first seen on the iPhone 12 Pro Max, to a lower-cost device. The iPhone 14 Pro and 14 Pro Max additionally introduced a higher-resolution 48-megapixel main camera, the first increase in megapixel count since the iPhone 6s; the Pro models also introduced always-on display technology to the lock screen, and an interactive status bar interface integrated in a redesigned screen cutout, called "Dynamic Island".

The iPhone 15, 15 Plus, 15 Pro, and 15 Pro Max were announced on September 12, 2023. Starting with this group of devices, all models switched to USB-C as their power connector to comply with European Commission regulations, replacing Apple's proprietary Lightning connector after eleven years of use in previous models. The 15 and 15 Plus feature the Dynamic Island, which debuted with the iPhone 14 Pro (effectively retiring the "notch" display cutout), a 48-megapixel main camera, slightly curved edges, and a color-infused frosted glass back. The 15 Pro and Pro Max also replace the mute switch with the "Action" button, and replace stainless steel with titanium.

The iPhone 16, 16 Plus, 16 Pro, and 16 Pro Max were announced on September 9, 2024. The iPhone 16 and 16 Plus introduced a vertical camera layout with refined "Fusion" and ultra-wide cameras. The 16 Pro and Pro Max have larger 6.3-inch and 6.9-inch displays, a 48-megapixel ultra-wide camera, and the largest batteries in an iPhone up to that point. All models include access to new Apple Intelligence AI features, a refined thermal system, support for Wi-Fi 7, and a new button dubbed the "Camera Control", allowing easier access to camera features. On February 19, 2025, the iPhone 16e was announced as the latest member of the 16 family. This model has a longer battery life due to the A18 chip and the new Apple C1, which is the first cellular modem designed by Apple. It has a 6.1-inch screen, and the same 48-megapixel camera as previous models, but lacks the wider shot option because of its lower price.

The iPhone 17, 17 Pro, 17 Pro Max, and iPhone Air were announced on September 9, 2025. These devices feature the faster A19 and A19 Pro chips, with improved CPU and GPU performance, including faster AI tasks. The always-on display and 120 Hz ProMotion are now standard across the September 2025 iPhone lineup. The iPhone Air is the thinnest iPhone ever made and is the first iPhone with only an earpiece speaker. The iPhone Air also features the new C1X cellular modem, which uses 30% less energy than the previous C1 chips. The iPhone 17 Pro models do not have this modem and instead use Qualcomm's Snapdragon X80 modem. The new Pro lineup has the distinctive camera plateau bump. The iPhone 17 Pro models also switch back to an aluminum body for better heat dissipation and feature a first for an iPhone: a vapor-chamber cooling system that helps regulate heat in heavy workloads. They also have the largest batteries and longest battery life yet in any iPhone model. On March 2, 2026, the iPhone 17e was announced as the latest member of the 17 family.

On September 9, 2026, Apple announced the iPhone 18 Pro, iPhone 18 Pro Max, and the foldable iPhone Duo. The 18 Pro and 18 Pro Max was available on September 18, 2026, followed by the iPhone Duo on October 23.

== Models ==
There are 55 iPhone models produced. The models in bold are devices of the latest generation:

iPhone models currently in production
Release date	Model	System-on-a-chip
September 20, 2024	iPhone 16	Apple A18
September 19, 2025	iPhone 17	Apple A19
September 19, 2025	iPhone Air	Apple A19 Pro
March 11, 2026	iPhone 17e	Apple A19
September 18, 2026	**iPhone 18 Pro**	Apple A20 Pro
September 18, 2026	**iPhone 18 Pro Max**	Apple A20 Pro
October 23, 2026	**iPhone Duo**	Apple A20 Pro

Availability and support lifespan of all iPhone models
Model	Release(d)		Discontinued	Support				Status
Model	With OS	Date	Discontinued	Ended	Final OS (Note: Last regular iOS version (probably with feature updates), in parentheses: last iOS supported)	Lifespan (Note: Min / max amount of time Apple support is/was available)		Status
Model	With OS	Date	Discontinued	Ended	Final OS	Max (Note: Maximal support lifespan = current or support end date - release date)	Min (Note: Minimal support lifespan = current or support end date - discontinue date)	Status
iPhone	iPhone OS 1.0	June 29, 2007	June 9, 2008	June 21, 2010	iPhone OS 3.1.3	2 years, 11 months	2 years	Discontinued and unsupported
iPhone 3G	iPhone OS 2.0	July 11, 2008	August 9, 2010	March 3, 2011	iOS 4.2.1	2 years, 7 months	6 months	Discontinued and unsupported
iPhone 3GS	iPhone OS 3.0	June 19, 2009	September 12, 2012	September 18, 2013 (late, single update: February 21, 2014)	iOS 6.1.3 (6.1.6)	4 years, 2 months	1 year	Discontinued and unsupported
iPhone 4	iOS 4.0	June 24, 2010	September 10, 2013	September 17, 2014	iOS 7.1.2	4 years, 2 months	1 year	Discontinued and unsupported
iPhone 4s	iOS 5.0	October 14, 2011	September 9, 2014	September 13, 2016 (late, single update: July 22, 2019)	iOS 9.3.5 (9.3.6)	4 years, 10 months	2 years	Discontinued and unsupported
iPhone 5	iOS 6.0	September 21, 2012	September 10, 2013	September 19, 2017 (late, single update: July 22, 2019)	iOS 10.3.3 (10.3.4)	4 years, 11 months	4 years	Discontinued and unsupported
iPhone 5c	iOS 7.0	September 20, 2013	September 9, 2015	September 19, 2017	iOS 10.3.3	3 years, 11 months	2 years	Discontinued and unsupported
iPhone 5s	iOS 7.0	September 20, 2013	March 21, 2016	September 18, 2019 (last security update: January 26, 2026)	iOS 12.4.1 (12.5.8)	5 years, 11 months	3 years, 5 months	Discontinued and unsupported
iPhone 6 / 6 Plus	iOS 8.0	September 19, 2014	September 7, 2016	September 18, 2019 (last security update: January 26, 2026)	iOS 12.4.1 (12.5.8)	4 years, 11 months	3 years	Discontinued and unsupported
iPhone 6s / 6s Plus	iOS 9.0	September 25, 2015	September 12, 2018	September 12, 2022 (last security update: May 11, 2026)	iOS 15.6.1 (15.8.8)	6 years, 11 months	4 years	Discontinued and unsupported, critical security bug fixes only
iPhone SE (1st)	iOS 9.3	March 31, 2016	September 12, 2018	September 12, 2022 (last security update: May 11, 2026)	iOS 15.6.1 (15.8.8)	6 years, 11 months	4 years	Discontinued and unsupported, critical security bug fixes only
iPhone 7 / 7 Plus	iOS 10.0	September 16, 2016	September 10, 2019	September 12, 2022 (last security update: May 11, 2026)	iOS 15.6.1 (15.8.8)	5 years, 11 months	3 years	Discontinued and unsupported, critical security bug fixes only
iPhone 8 / 8 Plus	iOS 11.0	September 22, 2017	April 15, 2020	September 18, 2023 (last security update: May 11, 2026)	iOS 16.6.1 (16.7.16)	5 years, 11 months	3 years, 1 month	Discontinued and unsupported, critical security bug fixes only
iPhone X	iOS 11.0.1	November 3, 2017	September 12, 2018	September 18, 2023 (last security update: May 11, 2026)	iOS 16.6.1 (16.7.16)	5 years, 10 months	5 years, 1 month	Discontinued and unsupported, critical security bug fixes only
iPhone XS / XS Max	iOS 12.0	September 21, 2018	September 10, 2019	September 15, 2025 (last security update: November 9, 2026)	iOS 18.7 (iOS 18.7.12)	7 years	6 years	Discontinued and unsupported, critical security bug fixes only
iPhone XR	iOS 12.0	October 26, 2018	September 14, 2021	September 15, 2025 (last security update: November 9, 2026)	iOS 18.7 (iOS 18.7.12)	6 years, 10 months	4 years	Discontinued and unsupported, critical security bug fixes only
iPhone 11	iOS 13.0	September 20, 2019	September 7, 2022	current: iOS 27.2.1	–	7 years, 1 month	4 years, 2 months	Discontinued, still supported
iPhone 11 Pro / 11 Pro Max	iOS 13.0	September 20, 2019	October 13, 2020	current: iOS 27.2.1	–	7 years, 1 month	6 years, 1 month	Discontinued, still supported
iPhone SE (2nd)	iOS 13.4	April 24, 2020	March 8, 2022	current: iOS 27.2.1	–	6 years, 6 months	4 years, 8 months	Discontinued, still supported
iPhone 12 / 12 Mini	iOS 14.1	October 23, 2020 (12); November 13, 2020 (12 Mini)	September 12, 2023 (12); September 7, 2022 (12 Mini)	current: iOS 27.2.1	–	6 years	4 years, 2 months	Discontinued, still supported
iPhone 12 Pro / 12 Pro Max	iOS 14.1 (12 Pro) iOS 14.2 (12 Pro Max)	October 23, 2020 (12 Pro); November 13, 2020 (12 Pro Max)	September 14, 2021	current: iOS 27.2.1	–	6 years (12 Pro); 6 years (12 Pro Max)	5 years, 2 months	Discontinued, still supported
iPhone 13 / 13 Mini	iOS 15.0	September 24, 2021	September 9, 2024 (13); September 12, 2023 (13 Mini)	current: iOS 27.2.1	–	5 years, 1 month	3 years, 2 months	Discontinued, still supported
iPhone 13 Pro / 13 Pro Max	iOS 15.0	September 24, 2021	September 7, 2022	current: iOS 27.2.1	–	5 years, 1 month	4 years, 2 months	Discontinued, still supported
iPhone SE (3rd)	iOS 15.4	March 18, 2022	February 19, 2025	current: iOS 27.2.1	–	4 years, 7 months	1 year, 8 months	Discontinued, still supported
iPhone 14 / 14 Plus	iOS 16.0	September 16, 2022 (14); October 7, 2022 (14 Plus)	February 19, 2025	current: iOS 27.2.1	–	4 years, 2 months	1 year, 8 months	Discontinued, still supported
iPhone 14 Pro / 14 Pro Max	iOS 16.0	September 16, 2022	September 12, 2023	current: iOS 27.2.1	–	4 years, 2 months	3 years, 2 months	Discontinued, still supported
iPhone 15 / 15 Plus	iOS 17.0	September 22, 2023	September 9, 2025	current: iOS 27.2.1	–	3 years, 1 month	1 year, 2 months	Discontinued, still supported
iPhone 15 Pro / 15 Pro Max	iOS 17.0	September 22, 2023	September 9, 2025	current: iOS 27.2.1	–	3 years, 1 month	2 years, 2 months	Discontinued, still supported
iPhone 16 / 16 Plus	iOS 18.0	September 20, 2024	September 9, 2026 (16 Plus)	current: iOS 27.2.1	–	2 years, 1 month		Current or still sold
iPhone 16 Pro / 16 Pro Max	iOS 18.0	September 20, 2024	September 9, 2025	current: iOS 27.2.1	–	2 years, 1 month	1 year, 2 months	Discontinued, still supported
iPhone 16e	iOS 18.3	February 28, 2025	March 2, 2026	current: iOS 27.2.1	–	1 year, 8 months	8 months	Discontinued, still supported
iPhone 17	iOS 26.0	September 19, 2025		current: iOS 27.2.1	–	1 year, 1 month		Current or still sold
iPhone Air	iOS 26.0	September 19, 2025		current: iOS 27.2.1	–	1 year, 1 month		Current or still sold
iPhone 17 Pro / 17 Pro Max	iOS 26.0	September 19, 2025	September 9, 2026	current: iOS 27.2.1	–	1 year, 1 month	2 months	Discontinued, still supported
iPhone 17e	iOS 26.3	March 11, 2026		current: iOS 27.2.1	–	8 months		Current or still sold
iPhone 18 Pro / 18 Pro Max	iOS 27.0	September 18, 2026		current: iOS 27.2.1	–	1 month		Current or still sold
iPhone Duo	iOS 27.1	October 23, 2026		current: iOS 27.2.1	–	0 months		Current or still sold
Legend: / Discontinued and unsupported / Discontinued, bug fixes only / Discontinued, still supported / Current or still sold
Remarks:

== Production ==
Up to the iPhone 4, all iPhones and other devices, such as iPod Touch models and iPads, were manufactured by Foxconn, based in Taiwan. In 2011, new CEO Tim Cook changed Apple's manufacturing strategy to diversify its supply base. The iPhone 4s in 2012 was the first model to be manufactured simultaneously by two standalone companies: Foxconn and Pegatron, the latter also based in Taiwan. Although Foxconn still produced more iPhones, Pegatron's orders gradually increased: the company made part of the iPhone 5c line in 2013, and 30% of iPhone 6 devices in 2014. The 6 Plus model was produced solely by Foxconn. In 2019, Apple investigated reports that some Foxconn managers had used rejected parts to build iPhones. In India, Apple pays Wistron, a Taiwan-based manufacturer with a plant near Bangalore, to assemble iPhones to sell in the region.

In 2022, Apple announced that a portion of the iPhone 14 would be manufactured in Tamil Nadu, India, as a response to China's "zero-COVID" policy that has negatively affected global supply chains for many industries. Apple also stated that it planned to shift 25% of iPhone production to India by 2025.

== Hardware ==
Apple directly subcontracts hardware production to external OEM companies, maintaining a high degree of control over the end product. The iPhone contains most of the hardware components of a typical modern smartphone. Some hardware elements, such as 3D Touch and the Taptic Engine, are unique to the iPhone. The main hardware of the iPhone is the touchscreen, with current models offering screens measuring 4.7 inches or larger. All iPhones include a rear-facing camera; the front-facing camera dates back to the iPhone 4. The iPhone 7 Plus introduced multiple lenses to the rear-facing camera. The device also includes a range of sensors, such as a proximity sensor, ambient light sensor, accelerometer, gyroscopic sensor, magnetometer, facial recognition sensor or fingerprint sensor (depending on the model), and barometer. In 2022, Apple added satellite communications to the iPhone, with the release of the iPhone 14 and iPhone 14 Pro.

== Software ==
=== Operating system ===
The iPhone runs iOS. It is based on macOS's Darwin and many of its userland APIs, with Cocoa replaced by Cocoa Touch, and AppKit replaced by UIKit. The graphics stack runs on Metal, Apple's low-level graphics API. The iPhone comes with a set of bundled applications developed by Apple, and supports downloading third-party applications through the App Store.

Apple provides free updates to iOS over the air or through Finder and iTunes on a computer. Major iOS releases have historically accompanied new iPhone models. As of September 2026, the most recent iOS version is iOS 27.

=== App Store and third-party apps ===
At WWDC 2007 on June 11, 2007, Apple announced that the iPhone would support third-party Ajax web applications that share the look and feel of the iPhone interface. On October 17, 2007, Steve Jobs, in an open letter posted to Apple's "Hot News" weblog, announced that a software development kit (SDK) would be made available to third-party developers in February 2008. The iPhone SDK was officially announced and released on March 6, 2008. The App Store was launched with the release of iPhone OS 2.0, on July 11, 2008.

Apple requires all third-party apps to be downloaded from the App Store, with exceptions for ad-hoc apps used within enterprises. Developers must pay a yearly $99 fee as part of Apple's Developer Program. If their membership expires, their apps are removed from the App Store, though existing users retain the ability to redownload the app. Developers can release free apps, or paid apps for which Apple takes a 30% cut of proceeds. Developers earning less than $1 million in annual sales qualify for the App Store Small Business Program, with Apple only taking a 15% fee.

Although iOS has a far lower market share than Android, its app ecosystem has been described as superior, with higher-quality apps and more iOS-exclusive releases. Android's version fragmentation, less uniform hardware, and lower app revenues have been cited as key factors.

All apps must pass Apple's app review process before being distributed in the App Store. Apple may also stop distributing apps it deems inappropriate. For example, in 2009, Apple rejected the Newspapers app due to The Sun's "obscene" topless Page 3 girls. In 2018, Apple removed Tumblr from the App Store, citing illegal content, causing Tumblr to ban all adult content from their platform. The App Store's review process has been criticized by developers as "frustrating", "anti-competitive", and "asinine".

Users can also install native apps outside of the App Store through jailbreaking, or through exploits, such as TrollStore. Jailbreaking may cause security issues and is not supported by Apple.

As of October 2013, Apple has passed 60 billion app downloads. As of September 2016, there have been over 140 billion app downloads from the App Store. In January 2017, the App Store had over 2.2 million apps for the iPhone. As of August 2024, Apple's App Store contains nearly 2 million applications.

=== Jailbreaking ===
Apple restricts the installation of unapproved third-party apps and does not allow full access to the iPhone's filesystem. According to Jonathan Zittrain, the emergence of closed devices like the iPhone has made computing more proprietary than it was in the PC era. Jailbreaking allows users to install apps not available on the App Store, customize their device in ways not allowed by Apple, and bypass SIM locks without carrier approval. Some jailbreak tweaks were later copied by Apple and implemented into iOS, like multitasking, widgets, and copy and paste.

Apple attempted to use the DMCA to fight jailbreaking; however, in 2010, the U.S. found jailbreaking to be legal. Jailbroken iPhones are at higher risk of malware because Apple has less control over the app ecosystem. In the United States, Apple cannot void an iPhone's warranty solely due to jailbreaking. Jailbreaks rely on exploits. Apple has improved the iPhone's hardware and software security, making these exploits harder to find; as a result, recent iPhones cannot currently be jailbroken.

=== Accessibility ===
The iPhone contains a range of accessibility features to support users' visual, auditory, and motor needs. iPhones can notify users through onscreen banners, audio alerts, vibrations, or the LED flash; vibration patterns can be customized by users. Since iOS 15, Siri can read notifications aloud through earphones, and, since iOS 16, through the device's speakers.

Users with motor needs can use AssistiveTouch to customize the way they navigate through menus; it can assist users who have difficulties with some gestures, like pinching, and makes these gestures available by tapping on a menu. Users can create their own gestures and customize the layout of the AssistiveTouch menu. If the user has trouble pressing the Home button, it can be set so that it can be activated with an onscreen tap. Gestures such as rotate and shake are available even if the iOS device is mounted on a wheelchair. Head Tracking can be used to control an iPhone using facial movements recognized by the front camera.

Low-vision users can enable VoiceOver, a screen reader that describes what is on the screen, while Siri allows for hands-free interaction. The iPhone also supports wireless braille displays to help users read its interface. Text can be enlarged system-wide. The Magnifier app uses the iPhone's Lidar scanner to identify items such as doors, people, and objects, and can describe them to the user, as well as their distance. Door Detection can alert the user through sound, speech, and haptics.

Hearing aids that are part of the Made for iPhone program can be controlled from an iPhone. These hearing aids also feature Live Listen, which enables the iPhone to act as a directional microphone, beaming its audio to compatible hearing aids. Live Listen can help the user hear a conversation in a noisy room or hear someone speaking across the room. Apple built Live Listen support into all AirPods, which can also relay audio from a connected iPhone's microphone. Closed captioning and external TTY devices are supported, while Live Caption can transcribe audio across all apps and display it onscreen. Sound Recognition can recognize surrounding noises, including door bells, kettles, water running, and babies crying, and notify the user with an onscreen alert.

Guided Access helps people with autism, ADHD, or sensory challenges stay focused on a single app. With Guided Access, a parent, teacher, or therapist can limit an iOS device to stay on one app by disabling the Home button and limit the amount of time spent in an app. The user can restrict access to the keyboard or touch input on certain areas of the screen.

== Marketing ==
The original iPhone was heavily promoted before its official announcement, creating buzz and anticipation. Upon its release, it was marketed heavily in television, web and print ads created in partnership with TBWA\Chiat\Day.

Apple's premium market positioning has led the iPhone to be seen as a status symbol.

The Apple ecosystem has been described as a key moat that increases iPhone brand loyalty. iMessage has especially been singled out for its "green bubbles" phenomenon. In iMessage, SMS messages from Android users appear as green bubbles, rather than the blue bubbles used for texts from other iPhone users. Until the introduction of Rich Communication Services (RCS) support in iOS 18 in 2024, group chats between iOS and Android were poorly supported, with reactions displayed as text rather than bubbles, and images sent through MMS, which degraded image quality. Some teens described being "ostracized" after switching to Android, which Google labeled "bullying". This has been described by critics as a key factor leading 88% of U.S. teenagers to use iPhones.

== Retail ==
=== SIM unlocking ===
Many iPhones bought through a monthly carrier contract are SIM locked, restricting their use to one particular carrier. While the iPhone was initially sold in the U.S. only on the AT&T network with a SIM lock in place, various hackers found methods to bypass that SIM lock. More than a quarter of first-generation iPhones sold in the U.S. were not registered with AT&T. Apple speculated that they were likely shipped overseas and unlocked, a lucrative market before the iPhone 3G's worldwide release. Today, many carriers either remove the SIM lock automatically after a certain period, or do it upon request, either for free or for a small fee. iPhones bought from Apple are not SIM locked. Many carriers also sell the iPhone unlocked when purchased outright rather than on a long-term contract.

=== Retail strategy ===
Since 2013, iPhone buyers can obtain a trade-in discount when buying a new iPhone directly from Apple. The program aims to increase the number of customers who purchase iPhones at Apple Stores rather than carrier stores. In 2015, Apple unveiled the iPhone Upgrade Program, a 24-month leasing agreement, which Fortune described as a "change [in] iPhone owners' relationships with mobile carriers".

=== Repairability ===
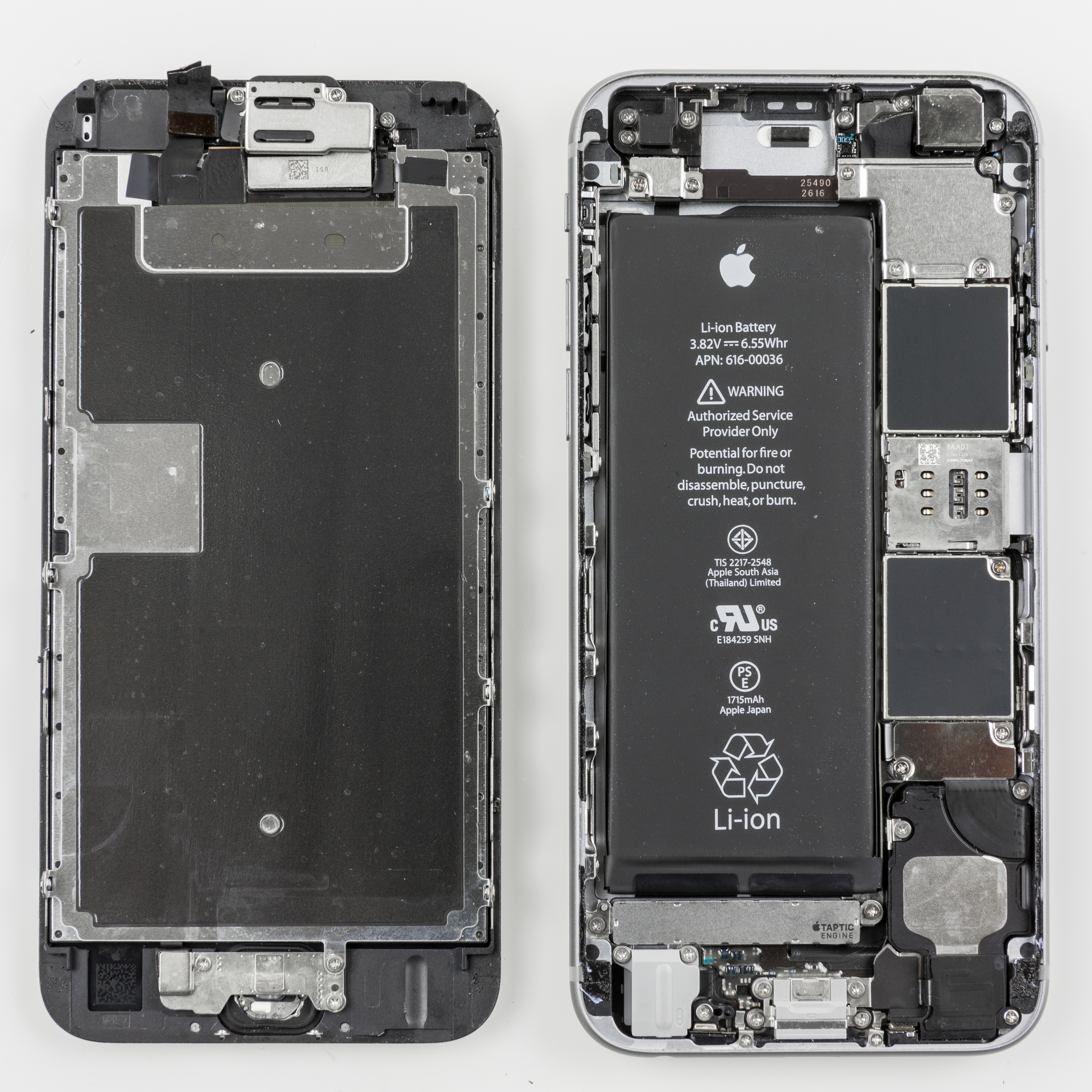
iPhone 6s's interior; the side on the left contains the display and the side on the right contains hardware and battery

Only Apple Stores and Apple Authorized Service Providers are allowed by Apple to perform genuine part replacements. iPhone components are soldered, and many are glued together. Despite this, iPhones receive high repairability scores. This is thanks to the rise of the right to repair movement, aimed at giving users cheaper options for repairing their phones. Apple has lobbied against right to repair legislation. Multiple jurisdictions aim to introduce right to repair laws, including the EU, UK, and U.S.

Starting with the iPhone XR, Apple displays warnings in the Settings app if the battery, display, or camera are replaced by a third party. Additionally, some features, such as True Tone or battery health measurement, are disabled when a part labeled "non-genuine" is detected. iFixit notes that a proprietary, cloud-linked System Configuration tool is required to "complete" a part repair, meaning that even replacing a genuine part with another genuine part will fail Apple's "genuine parts" check unless said tool is used.

In 2022, Apple rolled out a self-service repair program, allowing any user to buy parts, rent repair tools from Apple, and obtain repair manuals. The program received some praise from iFixit and repair advocates, who also noted that Apple maintains control over the parts supply.

== Privacy ==
=== Tracking prevention ===
Apple introduced App Tracking Transparency (ATT) with iOS 14.5 in April 2021. ATT requires apps to ask for explicit permission before tracking the user across other apps and websites. If the user refuses, the app cannot access Apple's Identifier for Advertisers (IDFA), an identifier used to serve personalized ads. ATT does not prevent personalized ads that are based on the user's behavior within the app itself. The feature has been criticized by some as anti-competitive, including Facebook, whose shares fell by 26% after its rollout. Apple exempts their own apps from their anti-tracking measures, which has led to anti-trust investigations by the French and German governments.

=== Location tracking controversy ===
In July 2010, Apple claimed that it collected iPhone users' GPS coordinates and nearby Wi-Fi networks twice a day; a Wall Street Journal investigation found that Google's Android sent this data "several times an hour".

In September 2010, forensic expert Christopher Vance discovered a hidden unencrypted file named "consolidated.db" that contained a record of iPhone users' locations. The file was added with the June 2010 iOS 4 update, though previous versions of iOS stored similar information in a file called "h-cells.plist". On April 20, 2011, The Guardian publicized research by Alasdair Allan and Pete Warden, who found that anyone with physical access to an iPhone could obtain a detailed record of its owner's location and movements over the past year. Moreover, the file was automatically backed up by iTunes onto any computer the iPhone was synchronized with. A Wall Street Journal investigation found that users' locations were still stored when location services are disabled. The controversy led to U.S. congressional scrutiny and an FCC investigation, and was dubbed "Locationgate" by the media.

Apple responded on April 27, 2011, stating that the data was used to cache nearby Wi-Fi hotspots and cell towers in order to improve location speed and accuracy. The company also claimed that the collection of locations when location services were off and the storage of those locations for more than a year were both bugs. Apple issued an update for iOS (version 4.3.3, or 4.2.8 for the CDMA iPhone 4) which reduced the size of the cache, encrypted it, stopped it from being backed up to iTunes, and erased it entirely whenever location services were turned off. Nevertheless, in July 2014, a report on state-owned China Central Television called iPhone tracking a "national security concern".

Currently, iPhones contain a "Frequent Locations" database that records where users have been, along with exact times they arrived and left, raising concerns that the data could be used in court. This feature can be turned off.

=== Child safety controversy ===
In August 2021, Apple announced plans to scan iCloud Photos for child abuse imagery (through an algorithm called "NeuralHash"), and to filter explicit images sent and received by children using iPhones (dubbed "Conversation Safety"), to be rolled out later that year. More than 90 policy and human rights groups wrote an open letter to condemn both features. Apple's plan to implement NeuralHash on-device rather than in the cloud led the EFF and security experts to call it a "backdoor" that could later be expanded to detect other types of contents, and would decrease users' privacy. Apple claimed the system was "misunderstood", but announced in December 2022 that the photo-scanning feature would never be implemented. The other feature, Conversation Safety, was added in iOS 15.2.

== Security ==
Apple's iOS operating system is regarded by most security experts as more secure against common malware than Android. Less than 1% of mobile malware targets iOS.

Prior to 2014, the iPhone stored all "messages, pictures and videos, contacts, audio recordings [...] and call history" in unencrypted form, enabling easy access by law enforcement. This changed with iOS 8, which adopted file-based encryption. Apple does not hold the decryption key, and cannot be compelled to turn over user data, even when presented with a government warrant. Companies like Grayshift and Cellebrite developed exploits that enable law enforcement to extract user data from iPhones without needing the user's passcode.

In 2015 and 2016, a dispute unfolded between Apple and the FBI. The FBI had recovered the iPhone 5c of one of the San Bernardino attackers, and iCloud backups of that phone from a month and a half before the shooting. The U.S. government attempted to obtain a court order under the All Writs Act compelling Apple to produce a modified version of iOS that would allow investigators to brute force the device passcode. Tim Cook responded on the company's website, outlining a need for encryption, arguing that a backdoor would compromise the privacy of all iPhone users. The DOJ withdrew its request after the FBI bought an exploit to bypass the iPhone's passcode. As a countermeasure, Apple implemented USB Restricted Mode, which was subsequently exploited too.

In 2016, researchers discovered the Pegasus suite of exploits targeting iOS and Android, which led to significant international media coverage. Some Pegasus exploits are zero-click, meaning that they can fully compromise the device with no user interaction, for example by sending a malformed iMessage to the user that would not even trigger a notification. Pegasus can collect most data, including chats, passwords, and photos, and can turn on the phone's microphone and camera remotely. Apple quickly issued an update fixing FORCEDENTRY and other known Pegasus exploits, though Pegasus continued to be used, relying on new exploits. Apple announced a new bug bounty for vulnerabilities, and added an optional Lockdown Mode to iOS 16 that reduces the iPhone's attack surface. Many security researchers have criticized Apple's bug bounty for underpaying researchers, being uncommunicative, and being slow to fix vulnerabilities, and two Apple employees told The Washington Post that the company "has a massive backlog of bugs that it hasn't fixed".

Prominent victims of Pegasus include Jamal Khashoggi and numerous activists, businesspeople, and politicians. Pegasus has been widely used since 2011, and is still used by law enforcement and governments as of July 2022.

Starting with all iPhone 17 models and the iPhone Air, devices based on the A19 and A19 Pro include Memory Integrity Enforcement (MIE). MIE is an always-on, hardware-and-OS, memory-safety defense that uses Apple's secure memory allocators, Enhanced Memory Tagging Extension (EMTE) in synchronous mode, and Tag Confidentiality Enforcement policies. By default, MIE hardens key attack surfaces including the kernel and over 70 userland processes while preserving performance. Apple states that MIE targets mercenary spyware by making end-to-end exploit chains significantly more expensive and difficult to develop and maintain.

== Reception and legacy ==
The original iPhone has been described as "revolutionary", a "breakthrough handheld computer", and "the best phone that anybody has ever made". It is now Apple's bestselling product, and has been credited with helping to make Apple one of the world's most valuable publicly traded companies by 2011. Newer iterations have also received praise and awards.

Before the iPhone, smartphones were mostly used for texting, calls, and email; more advanced functions were harder to use and inconvenient on a small screen. They were also difficult to develop for, and lacked a thriving app ecosystem like the App Store (released in 2008). Many phones were heavily customized by mobile carriers, which led to feature fragmentation and prevented these phones from turning into thriving software platforms. In contrast, Apple's iPhone SDK provided a wide range of APIs, made mobile development far more accessible, and was instrumental in turning the iPhone into a "Swiss army knife" with a wide range of features and apps.

Successive iPhone models have generated significant fan enthusiasm, with many customers lining up in front of Apple Stores on launch day. As of 2021, the iPhone has higher brand loyalty than any other smartphone.

The iPhone's success has led to the decline of incumbents Nokia, BlackBerry, and Motorola. RIM, Symbian, and Microsoft all attempted to develop more modern operating systems to compete with the iPhone, like Maemo, Windows Phone, and BlackBerry 10; all were unsuccessful. Google successfully started over on their Android project, and designed it for mass adoption by carriers and phone hardware manufacturers. Today, iOS and Android account for 99% of smartphones used worldwide.

=== Sales ===
Steve Jobs's initial target was to reach 1% of phone market share in 2008. Apple sold 6.1 million units of the original iPhone between Q3 FY2007 (Note: Each company may choose different quarters for their fiscal year. Apple's fiscal quarters correspond to the following months: Q1 ends in late December, Q2 ends in late March, Q3 ends in late June, and Q4 ends in late September. All references to quarters in this section refer to Apple's fiscal year quarters. The holiday quarter, the fourth quarter of the calendar year, is referred to as Apple's Q1. Since 2011, iPhone releases have consistently occurred in September at the end of Q4, meaning sales of a new model are mostly reflected in Q1 of the following fiscal year, covering October to December.) and Q4 FY2008, and 11.3 million units of the iPhone 3G in Q4 FY2008 and Q1 FY2009. In 2008, the iPhone reached 1.1% of worldwide mobile phone market share, and 8.2% of the smartphone market. During this time it was quickly becoming important in North America, and it ranked second by market share in the U.S. in 2009, behind the BlackBerry; in 2010 the iPhone 3GS was the best-selling smartphone in the U.S., the first time an iPhone reached the top spot in that market.

iPhone sales grew continuously year-over-year from its introduction until Q2 FY2016. The iPhone briefly surpassed BlackBerry in Q4 FY2008, and permanently overtook it starting in Q3 FY2010. By 2011, Apple had sold 100 million iPhones worldwide, and became the largest mobile phone vendor in the world by revenue, surpassing longtime leader Nokia. Q1 FY2012 marked Apple's best quarterly earnings in its history, with 53% of the company's revenues coming from iPhone sales. Phone sales are strongly seasonal, peaking in the holiday season (Apple's Q1). With the release of the iPhone 13 in Q1 FY2022, Apple temporarily topped Samsung, with 84.9 million units shipped compared with Samsung's 68.9 million. In most quarters, Apple is the second-largest smartphone vendor by units. (Note: Note that Statista presents data in calendar year quarters; Q4 in Statista data corresponds to Apple's FY Q1.) Apple sold 223 million iPhones in its financial year 2023 ending September 24.

Today, Samsung and Apple dominate the smartphone market, with 21.8% and 15.6% worldwide market share, respectively. Due to Apple's small lineup, Apple often dominates the list of best-selling smartphone models. Despite its lower market share, the iPhone's premium positioning has led it to capture nearly half of global smartphone revenue, and 80% of global smartphone profits, with Samsung taking the other 20%. Carriers compete with each other to subsidize iPhone upgrades, which is seen as a significant factor in iPhone sales, though this has reduced carrier profits. On July 27, 2016, Apple announced that it had sold their billionth iPhone. As of January 1, 2024, more than 2.3 billion iPhones have been sold. In July 2025, Apple CEO Tim Cook said that 3 billion iPhones have been sold.

Compared to other high-tech products, a greater proportion of iPhone users are female. The iPhone has been adopted by both consumers and business users. iPhone users are wealthier and spend more time on their phones than Android users on average. The iPhone is especially popular in the U.S., where it has a 50% market share and is used by 88% of teenagers. Worldwide, the iPhone accounts for 78% of the high-end ($1,000+) smartphone market.

Android overtook the iPhone's installed base in 2010, according to NPD Group. During Apple's earnings call on January 27, 2021, Tim Cook said that 1 billion iPhones were being actively used worldwide.

=== Emerging markets ===
While other manufacturers make separate entry-level phones, Apple's entry-level phones are previous years' models, part of an effort to increase its market share in emerging markets without diluting its premium brand. It also considers emerging market tastes in its product designs; for example, it introduced a gold iPhone after finding that gold was seen as a popular sign of a luxury product among Chinese customers. In 2017, Apple started manufacturing previous years' iPhone models in India; in 2022, it began manufacturing the current iPhone 14 there too. Analysts have speculated that this was partly caused by Apple's desire to reduce its dependence on China, and to overcome Indian import duties. In 2023, the Chinese government banned the use of iPhones by government civil servants in what was seen as an effort to reduce dependence on foreign technology and strengthen cybersecurity.

In May 2024, Iranian president Mohammad Mokhber banned imported iPhone 14 and newer models. In November, the ban was lifted and replaced with a 30% customs tariff on the phones.

== See also ==
- Apple Newton, an early personal digital assistant and the first tablet platform developed by Apple
