= Rigidity =

Rigid or rigidity may refer to:

== Mathematics and physics ==
- Stiffness, the property of a solid body to resist deformation, which is sometimes referred to as rigidity
- Structural rigidity, a mathematical theory of the stiffness of ensembles of rigid objects connected by hinges
- Rigidity (electromagnetism), the resistance of a charged particle to deflection by a magnetic field
- Rigidity (mathematics), a property of a collection of mathematical objects (for instance sets or functions)
- Rigid body, in physics, a simplification of the concept of an object to allow for modelling
- Rigid transformation, in mathematics, a rigid transformation preserves distances between every pair of points
- Rigidity (chemistry), the tendency of a substance to retain/maintain their shape when subjected to outside force
- (Modulus of) rigidity or shear modulus (material science), the tendency of a substance to retain/maintain their shape when subjected to outside force

== Medicine ==
- Rigidity (neurology), an increase in muscle tone leading to a resistance to passive movement throughout the range of motion
- Rigidity (psychology), an obstacle to problem solving which arises from over-dependence on prior experiences

== Other uses ==
- Real rigidity, and nominal rigidity, the resistance of prices and wages to market changes in macroeconomics
- Ridgid, a brand of tools
