= List of built-in iOS apps =

Apps pre-installed on the Apple iOS operating system

Apple Inc. creates numerous apps for iOS that come pre-installed or are included through system updates. Several of the default apps found on iOS have counterparts on Apple's other operating systems such as macOS, iPadOS, watchOS, and tvOS, which are often modified versions of or similar to the iOS application. As each app is integrated into the operating system itself, they often feature greater support for system features than third-party alternatives and are quick to adapt new features of iOS.

Apple has also included versions of iWork, iMovie, and GarageBand for free with new device activations since the release of iOS 7; however, these apps are maintained independently from the operating system, with updates instead released through the App Store. Since iOS 10, most pre-installed apps have been removable by choice. With iOS 14 or later, as well as iPadOS 15 or later, users can hide pre-installed apps in the newly introduced App Library, as well as change their default web browser and email client to a third-party alternative. And with iOS 18.2 or later, Apple expanded the default apps that users can change to include apps such as messaging apps, password managers, and more.

== Applications ==
=== App Store ===
The App Store is a digital distribution platform which allows users to browse and download apps developed with Apple's iOS Software Development Kit. The App Store opened on July 10, 2008, with the release of IPhone OS 2, launching with 500 applications available. The number of apps peaked at around 2.2 million in 2017, but declined slightly over the next few years as Apple began a process to remove old apps or 32-bit apps that do not function as intended or that don't follow current app guidelines. As of 2020, the store features around 1.8 million apps. On September 19, 2019, Apple Arcade, a gaming subscription service that provides unlimited access to a catalogue of games for a monthly fee, was released through a dedicated tab on the App Store.

=== Books ===
Books, formerly iBooks, is an e-book reading and store app released in mid-2010, as part of the iOS 4 update. Initially, iBooks was not pre-loaded onto iOS devices, but users could install it free of charge from the App Store. With the release of iOS 8, it became an integrated app. It primarily receives EPUB content from the Apple Books store, but users can also add their own EPUB and Portable Document Format (PDF) files via data synchronization with iTunes. Additionally, the files can be downloaded to Apple Books through Safari or Apple Mail. It is also capable of displaying e-books that incorporate multimedia. Books has also expanded to allow the purchase and listening of audiobooks through the app. Reading goals can be set which encourage users to read for an amount of time each day.

=== Calculator ===
Calculator is a basic calculator app introduced with the initial launch of the original iPhone and iPhone OS 1 in 2007. The standard mode includes a number pad, buttons for adding, subtracting, multiplying, and dividing. The app also contains a scientific calculator, with support for exponents and trigonometric functions. With iOS 18, Apple added support for unit conversions and introduced a Math Notes feature which supports more advanced maths like graphs.

=== Calendar ===
Calendar is a personal calendar app introduced with the initial launch of the original iPhone and iPhone OS 1 in 2007. It tracks events and appointments added by the user and includes various holidays depending on the location the phone is set to as well as birthdays from contacts. Users are also able to subscribe to other calendars from friends or third parties. Since iOS 5, Calendar supports online cloud backup of calendars using Apple's iCloud service, or synchronization with other calendar services, including Google Calendar and Microsoft Exchange Server. With iOS 18, users can see reminders in the calendar app as well.

=== Camera ===
Camera is a photo and video taking app introduced with the initial launch of the original iPhone and iPhone OS 1 in 2007. Photos can be taken with flash or with filters applied, as well as a timer option which will take a photo after three seconds have passed since hitting the capture button. The ability to record video footage was introduced in iPhone OS 3 and has since been updated so that videos can be filmed in time-lapse or slow motion. On the iPhone 7 Plus and above, photos can be taken in 'portrait mode', which creates a depth effect so that the subject is in focus while the background is blurred. The camera is also capable of creating panoramic images. On iPhone 11, iPhone 11 Pro, and iPhone SE (2nd generation) with iOS 13 or iPhone XR and iPhone XS or later on iOS 14 or later, the camera app was redesigned with a new font and a new UI for controls.

=== Clock ===
Clock is a timekeeping app introduced with the initial launch of the original iPhone and iPhone OS 1 in 2007. It allows users to view the current time in locations around the world, set alarms and timers, and use their phone as a stopwatch. Alarms and timers will play a chime once completed, which the user can choose from their ringtone library. A bedtime feature was introduced in iOS 10, which acts as a special alarm in which the user sets both a time they would like to go to bed and a time they would like to wake up. A notification is sent to the user before their set bedtime and the phone is automatically placed into Do Not Disturb mode until morning.

=== Compass ===
Compass is a simple navigation app featuring a compass that was introduced with iPhone OS 3 on June 17, 2009. It displays the user's direction on a compass rose, as well as their current geographical coordinates, location, and altitude. The app is exclusive to iPhone, but it could be installed onto iPad devices through jailbreaking.

=== Contacts ===
Contacts is an address book app that was first included as part of the Phone app with the launch of the original iPhone in 2007 but was split off into a standalone application with the release of iPhone OS 2. Contacts can be synchronized over iCloud and other online address book services and allows for the storage of names, phone numbers, email addresses, home addresses, job titles, birthdays, and social media usernames.

=== FaceTime ===
FaceTime is a videotelephony app available on supported iOS devices running iOS 4 and later which allows for video calls between participants using any camera of their device. FaceTime Audio, an audio-only version, is available on any iOS device that supports iOS 7 or newer. In 2018, Apple added group video and audio support to FaceTime which can support up to 32 people alongside the release of iOS 12. With iOS 15, users are able to share music and video content together over FaceTime via SharePlay. iOS 15 also allowed iPhone users to share calls with non-Apple devices using links, notably Android phones. With iOS 17, users can leave a video message if the call recipient does not answer.

=== Files ===
Files is a file management app for devices that run iOS 11 and later. Files allows users to browse local files stored within apps, as well as files stored in cloud storage services, including iCloud, Dropbox, Google Drive, and OneDrive. With iOS 13, it gained the ability to access external drives, but it was not until iOS 17 that it could rename and erase them. Files allows for the saving, opening and organization of files, including placement into structured folders and sub-folders. Further organization can be done through the use of color-coded or custom-named tags, and a persistent search bar allows for finding files inside folders, though not inside other apps. The app also allows for the compression and decompression of ZIP archives, as well as the exclusive playback of high-quality FLAC audio files and limited support for video.

Before iOS 26, Files would also open PDF and digital image files. This functionality was later moved into the standalone Preview app.

=== Find My ===
Find My is an app and service that enables users to track the locations of iOS, iPadOS, macOS, watchOS, AirPods, AirTags and accessories compatible with the Find My network. The app was first released with iOS 13 on September 19, 2019, and combines both the Find My iPhone and Find My Friends apps. Missing devices can be made to play a sound at maximum volume, flagged as lost and locked with a passcode, or remotely erased. Users are also able to share their GPS locations with friends and family who own Apple devices of their own and can set notifications for when a person arrives or leaves a destination. For select iPhone models, users can share their location via a satellite connection when there is no Wi-Fi connection or cell service available. With iOS 14.3, Find My gained the ability to track items with AirTags, as well various third-party items that support the Find My network.

=== Fitness ===
Fitness, formerly Activity, is an exercise tracking companion app available on iPhones running iOS 8.2 or above for users with a connected Apple Watch, or on any device running iOS 16. The app displays a summary view of user's recorded workouts from the Apple Watch or supported third-party apps and exercise equipment. Workouts in the fitness app show relevant metrics, such as heart rate, depending on the type of exercise, and after an 180-day period, the app will show users their exercise trends averaged over the present and past rolling 90-day windows.

On December 14, 2020, Apple Fitness+, a guided workout video streaming service, was made available through the Fitness app.

=== Freeform ===
Freeform is a virtual brainstorming app first made available on December 13, 2022, alongside iOS 16.2. It allows users to create canvases called "boards", which can display a range of inputs including text notes, photos, documents, and web links. There are also a variety of pen and brush tools available on the iOS and iPadOS versions of the software, letting users add sketches or handwriting to their boards similar to the tools available in the Notes app, which are compatible with the Apple Pencil. The app offers real-time collaboration between users, with support for FaceTime and iCloud syncing.

=== Games ===
Games is a gaming hub and launcher released alongside iOS 26. Players are able to view their library of games through the app and browse available titles from the App Store and Apple Arcade. Through the Game Center service, users can connect with friends to organise online multiplayer games, compete in challenges or high-score leaderboards, and earn achievements for completing certain tasks in supported titles.

It functions similarly to the former standalone Game Center application, which was introduced with iOS 4.1 but later removed in iOS 10 with some functions moving to the Settings app.

=== Health ===
Health is a health informatics app announced on June 2, 2014, available on iPhones running iOS 8 or later and iPads with iPadOS 17. The app stores and tracks user's health data and clinical medical records and can be connected to various hardware devices and third-party apps. It also offers a profile called "Medical ID" that provides easy access to important medical information for first responders. In 2018, "Health Records" were introduced, which allowed users on iOS 11.3 or later to import their medical records from their doctor or hospital. As of 2020, the types of data stored by the Health app include steps, walking and running distance, flights climbed, heart rate, nutrition, sleep analysis, heart rate variability, cycle tracking, and weight.

=== Home ===
Home is a smart-home management app released on September 13, 2016, along with iOS 10 that lets users configure, communicate with, and control their HomeKit enabled smart appliances from a single application. It supports automations using a home hub, and pre-programmed "Scenes", which can set multiple devices using a single command. Appliances can be divided into separate rooms and access to home controls can be shared with others. HomePod devices are also updated through the home app.

=== Image Playground ===
Image Playground, sometimes referred to as simply Playground, is an AI photo generation app released as part of the rollout of Apple Intelligence. Users can enter phrases or descriptions or select various thematic "bubbles" to create an image in either "Animation" or "Sketch" styles. All images are generated on-device and rough sketches made with Apple Pencil can also be transformed into images.

=== iTunes Store ===
The iTunes Store is a digital media store operated by Apple Inc. that opened on April 28, 2003, as a result of Steve Jobs' push to open a digital marketplace for music. The iTunes Store was first made available on iOS devices with the release of iPhone OS 1.1 on the iPod touch and iPhone OS 1.1.1 on the iPhone, allowing the purchase of music and podcasts. iPhone OS 3 further added the ability to rent and purchase movies and TV shows from the iTunes Store. As of April 2020, iTunes offers 60 million songs, 2.2 million apps, 25,000 TV shows, and 65,000 films. When it opened, it was the only legal digital catalog of music to offer songs from all five major record labels. As of June 2013, the iTunes Store possessed 575 million active user accounts, and served over 315 million mobile devices.

=== Journal ===
Journal is a personal journaling app released on December 12, 2023, alongside iOS 17.2. The app encourages users to create diary entries in which they can record and reflect upon their thoughts and activities throughout the day. Users can also include a range of attachments with an entry including photos, video, voice recordings, location tags, and completed workouts. Journal also includes various writing suggestions and starter questions to prompt or inspire users who may find it hard to start writing. Journal can also be locked via Face ID, Touch ID or device passcode to prevent access from other users, and a schedule can also be set which sends a notification out at a set time on chosen days.

=== Magnifier ===
Magnifier is a digital magnifying glass, available as both an accessibility shortcut and as a standalone application in later versions of iOS. It uses the device's camera to allow users to zoom in on information in front of them, as well as take a freeze frame which can be saved as an image similar to the Camera app. A range of color filters can be applied for easier viewing, and the brightness and contrast of the image can be manually adjusted. With the release of the iPhone 12, the Magnifier app has included the ability to detect people and doors for those with vision impairments through the device's lidar sensors.

=== Mail ===
Mail is an email client introduced with the initial launch of the original iPhone and iPhone OS 1 in 2007. It is preconfigured to work with popular email providers, such as Yahoo! Mail, AOL Mail, Gmail, Outlook and iCloud (formerly MobileMe) and supports Exchange. Mail includes the ability to read & compose emails, file emails into folders, search for emails, automatically append signatures to outgoing emails, and automatically unsubscribe from newsletters. Rich text formatting was introduced to Apple Mail with the release of iOS 5. Unlike some email clients, Mail does not have any targeted ads.

=== Maps ===
Maps is a web mapping app and service introduced with the initial launch of the original iPhone and iPhone OS 1 in 2007. It provides turn-by-turn directions and estimated times of arrival for automobile, pedestrian, cycling and public transportation navigation. Indoor maps for airports and large shopping malls were introduced to Maps with the release of iOS 11. Apple Maps also features a Flyover mode, a feature that enables a user to explore certain densely populated urban centers and other places of interest in a 3D landscape composed of models of buildings and structures. Look Around, which allows the user to view 360° street-level imagery, was introduced and released alongside iOS 13.

Initially, Maps used data from Google Maps until Apple released their own service on September 19, 2012.

=== Measure ===
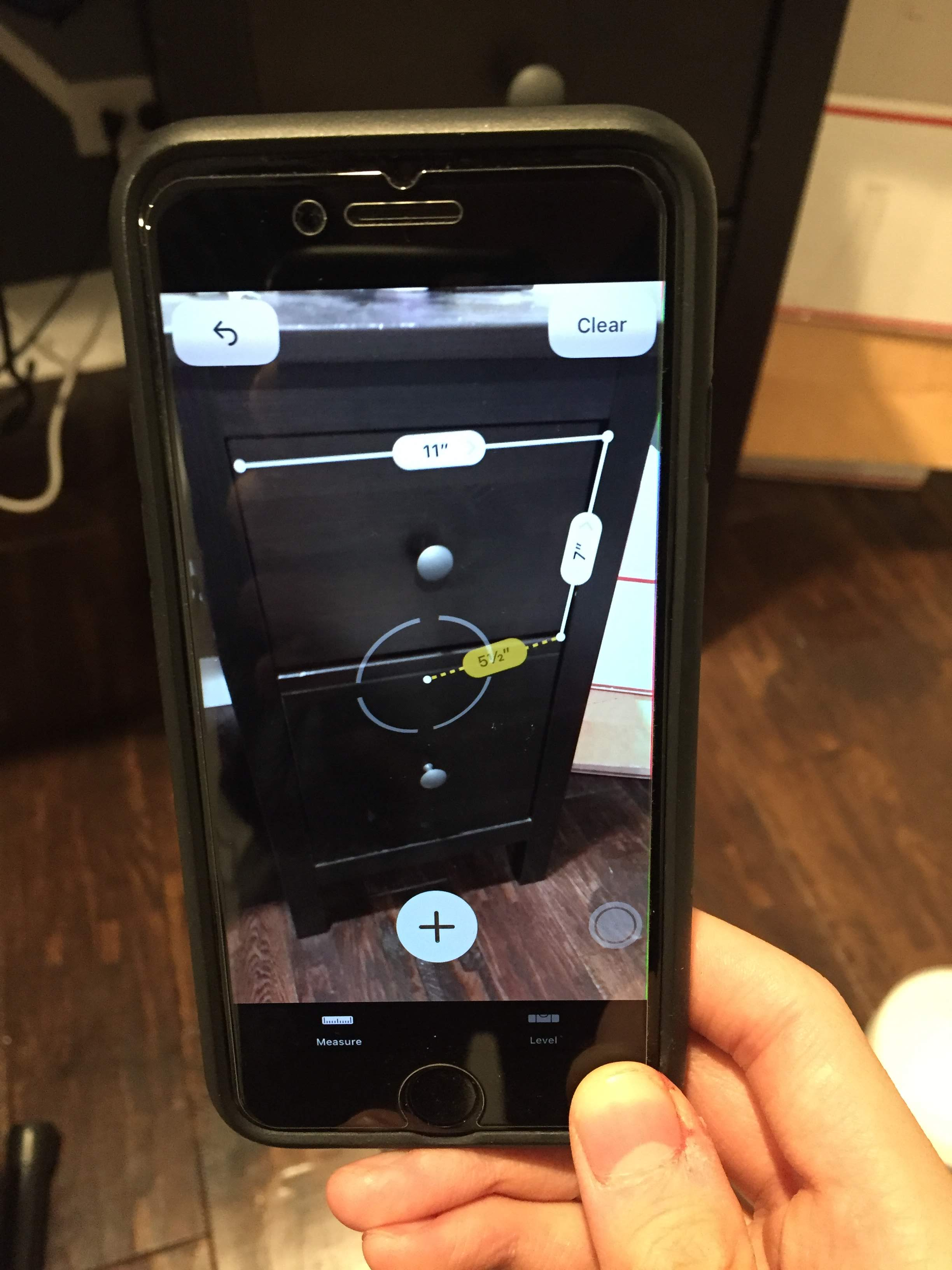
Demonstration of the Measure app on an iPhone 7

Measure is an augmented reality measurement app available on devices running iOS 12 and above. Using Apple's ARKit, it allows users to measure objects by pointing the device's camera at them. It is capable of measuring in both metric and imperial units and moving the camera closer to an object will display a ruler view which divides measurements into centimeters or inches, respectively. The app also allows for an iPhone to be used as a level; a feature previously available in the Compass app.

=== Messages ===
Messages is an instant messaging app introduced with iPhone OS 3 on June 17, 2009, that replaced the older Text app. The app supports SMS, MMS, and the iMessage service was introduced in iOS 5. The bubble of messages sent via SMS appearing green, messages sent over iMessage appearing blue and messages sent over a satellite connection appearing grey. iOS 10 introduced a number of upgrades to the iMessage platform, including message effects and a dedicated iMessage App Store which allows users to download sticker packs that can be sent in conversations. iOS 16 introduced the ability to edit or delete messages within a fifteen-minute window after being sent. Messages also allows users with compatible iPhone models to use Emergency SOS via satellite and Roadside Assistance via satellite.

=== Music ===
Music is a media player first introduced with iOS 5 on October 12, 2011, replacing the iPod app. It can play music files stored locally on devices and allows users to curate their song library into playlists. Songs can be purchased directly from the iTunes Store or streamed through Apple Music if the user has an active subscription. Internet radio stations can also be found within the app, with both local and international broadcasters available. Music supports lossless and spatial audio, and is capable of video playback, used primarily for music videos, artist interviews, and live performances.

=== News ===
News is a news aggregator available in the United States for devices running iOS 9 or above. It is the successor to the Newsstand app included in previous versions of iOS. Users can read news articles with it, based on publishers, websites and topics they select, such as technology or politics. On March 25, 2019, Apple News+ was made available within the News app, which is a subscription service allowing access to content from a number magazines and newspapers. On July 15, 2020, Apple announced the addition of audio stories in Apple News+, which allows subscribers to listen to narrated versions of articles in a similar fashion to a podcast under a new Audio tab. A dedicated Sports tab was added to the app in March 2023, providing news stories and score coverage for a user's favourite teams.

=== Notes ===
Notes is a notetaking app introduced with the initial launch of the original iPhone and iPhone OS 1 in 2007. It functions as a service for making text notes and sketches, which can be synchronised between devices using Apple's iCloud service. With the release of iOS 9, advanced text formatting options, several styles of lists, rich web and map link previews, support for more file type attachments, a corresponding dedicated attachment browser, and a system share extension point for saving web links, images, and more were added to the Notes app. Since iOS 11, Notes has included a document scanner feature.

=== Passwords ===
Passwords is a password manager app introduced with iOS 18, allowing users to store and access account information saved to their iCloud Keychain or created via Sign in with Apple. Passwords also supports the use of passkeys and multi-factor authentication security codes and provides users with security recommendations if their passwords are easily guessable or found in a data breach. Accounts can also be added into shared groups to allow access with friends and family.

=== Phone ===
Phone is an app introduced with the initial launch of the original iPhone and iPhone OS 1 in 2007. One of the key features of the original iPhone, the app allows users to make and receive phone calls, view their call history, and access their voicemail. The device's address book can also be accessed from within the Phone app, even if the Contacts app is uninstalled. With iOS 18, Phone is also capable of recording and transcribing calls. Recipients are notified when a call is being recorded.

=== Photos ===
Photos is a photo management and editing app introduced with initial launch of the original iPhone and iPhone OS 1 in 2007 and rebuilt from the ground up with iOS 8. Photos are organized by "moments", which are a combination of time and location metadata attached to the photo. Photos can be synced and backed up through the iCloud Photo Library and shared albums. Photos contains a number of simple editing tools which allow users to crop, rotate, and adjust their photos, with a limited number of editing tools available for videos.

=== Podcasts ===
Podcasts is a media player used for playing podcasts available for users running iOS 6 or above, after previously being available through the Music app. Podcasts can be discovered and followed or subscribed to in the 'Browse' and 'Search' tabs, with the 'Listen Now’ tab showing new episodes of followed podcasts as they are made available. Podcast channels allow users to follow or subscribe to creators rather than individual shows.

=== Preview ===
Preview is a PDF viewer first introduced in iOS 26, based on the program originally developed for NeXTSTEP and carried over to MacOS. The app is capable of viewing, editing, and annotating a number of documents and digital image files saved to the device or an iCloud Drive. Preview can also create new image files or scan physical documents using the device's camera, converting them into Portable Document Format (PDF) files. It employs the Quartz graphics layer, and the ImageIO and Core Image frameworks.

=== Reminders ===
Reminders is a task management app first introduced with the release of iOS 5 and rebuilt from the ground up in iOS 13. The app allows users to create their own lists of reminders and set notifications for themselves. New reminders can be placed into lists or set as subtasks and can include several details including: a priority tag, a note about the reminder, and an image or URL attachment. Additionally, alarms can be set for reminders, sending a notification to users at a certain time and date, when a geofence around an area is crossed, or when a message starts being typed to a set contact. If a time-based alert is set, it can repeat every day, week, two weeks, month, or year. Lists can be synced through iCloud and shared with other contacts.

=== Remote ===
Apple TV Remote is a companion app that allows users to control their Apple TV (device) devices from their iPhone. The app features a virtual trackpad to navigate menus in a similar fashion to the first-generation Siri Remote and has enhanced controls for playback, allowing the user to play, pause, fast forward, rewind, skip through, or adjust subtitles when content is playing. For supported media, the Remote app can also display metadata and other information about what is currently playing on the device. Users can enter text inputs and auto-fill passwords on the TV from their iPhone keyboard and the phone's physical buttons can also be used to adjust the volume level or activate Siri.

Remote was first introduced as a free standalone download from the App Store in 2008 and could also control playback from iTunes running on a Mac or PC. The Apple TV Remote feature was later integrated natively into the Control Center with iOS 12, with the standalone app later removed from the App Store in 2020. With iOS 27, Apple reintroduced the ability to access the Apple TV Remote app from the home screen or App Library.

=== Safari ===
Safari is a graphical web browser based on the WebKit engine bundled with iOS devices since the original iPhone's introduction in 2007. Websites can be bookmarked, added to a reading list, or saved to the home screen and are synced between devices through iCloud. With iOS 13, Safari was updated with a download manager which allows users to save files from the web onto their phone's local storage. Safari received a significant redesign in iOS 15, including a new landing page and support for browser extensions from the App Store.

=== Settings ===
Settings is an app available since initial launch of the original iPhone in 2007. Settings allows users to access information about their device and change the settings and options on their phone such as the device wallpaper, notifications, Wi-Fi and Bluetooth, display and brightness, Siri and more. A user's Apple ID and iCloud accounts are also managed from within the settings app, as well as third-party account details through the built-in password manager. With the release of iOS 12, a Screen Time feature was introduced which is intended to help user's focus and combat smartphone addiction.

=== Shortcuts ===
Shortcuts, formerly Workflow, is a block-based visual scripting app. Workflow was acquired by Apple in 2017 and became a default app with the release of iOS 13. The app allows users to create macros for executing specific tasks on their device. These task sequences can be created by the user and shared online through iCloud. A number of curated shortcuts can also be downloaded from the integrated gallery.

=== Stocks ===
Stocks is a stock market tracking app introduced with the initial launch of the original iPhone and iPhone OS 1 in 2007, and on iPads with iOS 12. It allows users to check financial data for any company publicly listed, including the current value of a company and their increase or decrease percentage. A graph shows the trends of each company over time, with a green graph showing positive growth and a red graph showing a decline. Business News is provided at the bottom of the app, which shows Apple News articles about companies a user is following.

=== Tips ===
Tips is an app introduced with iOS 8 which provides tips and guides for users to get the most out of their Apple devices. New tips are added alongside each major iOS release to show users what's new on their devices and sorted into categories such as "Essentials" and "Genius Picks".

=== Translate ===
Translate is a translation app released on September 16, 2020, alongside iOS 14. It functions as a service for translating text sentences or speech between several languages. All translations are processed through the device's neural engine, and as such can be used offline. iOS 16 introduced camera translation, allowing users to translate text on objects or physical documents in real-time. Translation is currently supported between 18 languages, including English (both British and American dialects), Arabic, Mandarin Chinese, French, German, Spanish, Italian, Japanese, Korean, the Brazilian dialect of Portuguese and Russian.

=== TV ===
TV, also known as Apple TV and formerly Videos, is a media player app used for viewing television shows and films purchased or rented through the iTunes Store, which can be accessed from within the app. It also houses original content from the Apple TV streaming service, and can even directly stream content from some third-party services through the a la carte video on demand "Apple TV Channels" service. The TV app can be used to index and access content from other linked video on demand services, allowing programs watched in other apps to appear in a user's Up Next feed, even if they are not subscribed through the Channels service. The TV app is also capable of broadcasting live sports and events.

=== Voice Memos ===
Voice Memos is a voice recording app introduced on iPhones with the release of iPhone OS 3, designed for saving short snippets of audio for later playback. Saved voice memos can be shared as a .m4a file or can be edited, which allows parts of a recording to be replaced, background noise to be removed, or the length of a recording to be trimmed. Other playback options include the ability to change playback speed, skip silent parts of a memo, or enhance a recording. Audio files can also be organised into different folders.

=== Wallet ===
Wallet, formerly Passbook, is a digital wallet included with iOS 6 and above that allows users to store Wallet-passes, meaning coupons, boarding passes, student ID cards, event tickets, movie tickets, public transportation tickets, retail store cards, and – starting with iOS 8.1 – credit cards, debit cards, prepaid cards, and loyalty cards via Apple Pay. Apple has since expanded Wallet even further, introducing support for car keys with supported manufacturers, house keys for smart lock devices, hotel room keys, and driver's licenses in some US states. Unlike their physical counterparts, cards stored in Wallet are able to display additional information that updates over time, such as transaction histories or point balances for loyalty cards. Since iOS 16, users can also track progress on deliveries and orders as well as view receipts through Wallet.

Wallet also acts as the main interface for Apple Card, Apple's credit card service.

=== Watch ===
Watch allows users to set-up and pair their Apple Watch devices to their iPhones, as well as customize settings, watch faces, and loaded apps. The face gallery displays options for available watch faces, giving users the option to change preferences and complications from their phones rather than directly on the watch, with the ability to share custom layouts with others. The Discover tab highlights compatible and recommended apps from the App Store and shows users tips on how to get the most from their device.

=== Weather ===
Weather is a weather forecasting app introduced with the initial launch of the original iPhone and iPhone OS 1 in 2007. The app allows the user to see weather conditions throughout the day, as well as a seven-day forecast. Locations can be added by pressing the list icon and the plus icon which allows the user to type in the city's name, ZIP Code or postal code or airport code. Weather also displays related metrics, such as the time of sunrise and sunset, humidity, chance of rain, visibility distance, and a UV index. The app is also capable of notifying users of any severe weather warnings issued by official sources.

== Discontinued ==
=== Game Center ===
Game Center was released to the public on September 8, 2010, with iOS 4.1. On June 13, 2016, the standalone Game Center application was removed from iOS 10 and macOS Sierra, though the service was still available; management of user profiles was moved within the Settings app.

=== YouTube ===
YouTube was an app that was introduced with the release of the original iPhone in iPhone OS 1 which allowed users to find, search, and watch YouTube videos. The built-in YouTube app was removed with the release of iOS 6 in favor of Google (the owner of YouTube), releasing their own app that is publicly accessible on the App Store.

== See also ==
- List of software by Apple
- List of built-in macOS apps
