= IOS 14 =

2020 mobile operating system

iOS 14
- Version of the iOS operating system

- iOS 14 home screen on an iPhone 12
- Developer: Apple
- Working state: No longer supported
- Source model: Closed, with open-source components
- General availability: September 16, 2020; 6 years ago
- Latest release: 14.8.1 (October 26, 2021; 5 years ago) [±]
- Update method: Software Update
- Package manager: App Store
- Supported platforms: iPhone, iPod Touch
- Kernel type: Hybrid (XNU)
- Default user interface: Cocoa Touch (multi-touch, GUI)
- License: Proprietary software with open-source components
- Preceded by: iOS 13
- Succeeded by: iOS 15
- Official website: iOS 14 at the Wayback Machine (archived September 13, 2021)
- Tagline: Looks brand new. Feels like home.

Support status
- Obsolete, unsupported

Articles in the series

iOS 14 is the fourteenth major release of the iOS mobile operating system developed by Apple for the iPhone and iPod touch lines. Announced at the company's Worldwide Developers Conference on June 22, 2020, as the successor to iOS 13, it was released to the public on September 16, 2020. It was succeeded by iOS 15 on September 20, 2021.

== System features ==
=== App Clips ===
App Clips are a new feature expanding on the functionality of the App Store. Intended as a dynamic feature rather than a permanently installed app, App Clips are extremely pared-back with very few OS permissions. At the time of the announcement, only the use of Apple Pay and Sign in with Apple were shown.

App Clips may be discovered in person via NFC tags (iPhone 7 or newer) or QR codes with App Clips branding. They may also be shared via Messages, or placed on websites or Maps.

=== CarPlay ===
CarPlay was updated to allow users to set a built-in wallpaper. Route management in Apple Maps was extended with features alerting the user to available stops, such as parking and food ordering. Additionally, route planning for electric vehicles now considers the location of charging stations.

=== Car keys ===
Car keys allow an iPhone to act as a virtual car key using NFC technology with compatible cars. The first compatible car showcased by Apple at the WWDC 2020 was the 2021 BMW 5 Series. Keys are accessible from the Wallet app. Keys may be shared; sharing may be temporary or given restrictions. In the event the iPhone is out of battery, car keys can still be accessed via the power reserve of the iPhone for about five hours. Car keys require an iPhone released in 2018 or later.

=== Home screen ===
Unlike previous versions, in which icons on the home screen were rearranged in order and corresponded directly to apps, users may add app icons and newly introduced app widgets; pages may be added or deleted at will. This allows users to hide infrequently used apps and avoid clutter.

==== Widgets ====
To the left of the first page, the widgets are redesigned and made customizable. They may be placed on the home screen to sit amongst app icons; they may be resized to two-by-two, horizontal two-by-four, or four-by-four icons. Widgets of the same size may be stacked over each other and swiped between for convenience; a Smart Stack may be placed which automatically shows the most relevant widget to the user based on the time of day.

==== App Library ====
To the right of the last page, the App Library lists and categorizes apps installed on the device. Apps within each category are arranged based on the frequency of their usage. In addition to a category for suggested apps, a "recent" category lists apps recently installed alongside App Clips recently accessed. Users can search for the app they want or browse them in alphabetical order.

=== Compact UI ===
A series of changes were made in iOS 14 to reduce the visual space taken by previously full-screen interfaces; such interfaces now appear and hover in front of an app, allowing for touch (and therefore multitasking) on the app behind. Voice calling interfaces, including Phone, or other third-party apps such as Skype, are made substantially thinner, taking approximately as much space as a notification. Siri's interface is now also compact.

Picture-in-picture allows users to continue watching video playback (or take voice calls, such as with FaceTime) in a thumbnail-sized view after leaving the app. This view may be resized with pinch gestures, or moved off-screen temporarily and re-summoned for multitasking. Picture-in-picture is currently supported by Safari and FaceTime, along with several third-party apps, including Disney+, ESPN, Max, Netflix, and Amazon Prime Video. This feature was not available in the YouTube app at launch; Google subsequently announced that picture-in-picture would be supported on YouTube in a forthcoming update, but only for subscribers to YouTube Premium. Ultimately, this feature was delayed until July 2022, when it was made available for all users with devices running iOS 15 or higher.

=== Search and Siri ===
Improvements to the Search feature on the home screen were made, including a refined UI which only now takes up a small circle and text bubble on the screen instead of the entire screen, quick launcher for apps, more detailed web search, shortcuts to in-app search, and improved as-you-type search suggestions.

While made compact so that content below is visible, Siri's interface does not allow for simultaneous multitasking, as designers felt it unclear how the interface would then be dismissed. Siri can now answer a broader set of questions and translate more languages. Users can also share their ETA with contacts and ask for cycling directions.

=== Security and Privacy ===
==== App Store ====
On iOS 14.3 and later, the App Store now displays the permissions required for each application (so users can see and understand permissions required by the application prior to downloading it). Users may change location permissions to inform the app of an approximate location, preserving privacy when exact location is unnecessary.

==== Notifications for microphone, camera, and clipboard usage ====
A recording indicator appears at the top of the screen whenever an app uses the microphone (orange dot indicator) or camera (green dot indicator). Likewise, a notification appears when the clipboard is accessed by an app.

==== Application Tracking Transparency ====
Apps must request the user consent if they intend to track user activities across apps and websites.

During the iOS 14 announcement, Apple pledged to improve users' privacy by limiting apps' access to Apple's Identifier for Advertisers (also known as IDFA or Advertising Identifier). This change was postponed "until early 2021 in iOS/iPadOS 14.5" to let developers migrate to more privacy-friendly alternatives. Facebook has notably opposed such privacy measures, arguing that small businesses need to access user data for targeted advertising. Statistics from Verizon subsidiary Flurry Analytics show after iOS 14.5 was released, only 11-12% of all consumers and 4% of American consumers have allowed Facebook to track them, in what has been described as a "nightmare" for Facebook.

==== Wi-Fi MAC address randomization ====
To limit tracking and improve privacy, devices now use a different MAC address for each Wi-Fi network instead of using the physical device Wi-Fi MAC address.

==== Local network restriction ====
A new privacy option can restrict certain applications from discovering and interacting with other devices on a home network through Bonjour or other network protocols.

==== Other internal security changes ====
One of the major changes in iOS 14 is the introduction of a new, tightly sandboxed 'BlastDoor' service which is now responsible for almost all parsing of untrusted data in iMessages. BlastDoor inspects all inbound messages in a secure, sandboxed environment, which prevents any malicious code inside of a message from interacting with the rest of the operating system or accessing user data. A specially-crafted message sent to a target can no longer interact with the file system or perform network operations.

If the camera module is not detectable as genuine Apple component, the system will warn the user.

=== ARKit 4 ===
ARKit 4 introduced Depth API for new access to depth information from the LiDAR sensors on the iPhone 12 Pro. ARKit 4 also introduced Location Anchor, which uses data from Apple Maps and enables augmented reality experiences to be placed on geographical coordinates and other smaller improvements.

=== MagSafe ===
iOS 14 adds MagSafe accessory support for the iPhone 12 and beyond (as of 2023) lineup, with a new animation for each accessory.

=== Other changes ===
Other changes include that the Emoji keyboard was updated with a search function. iOS 14 adds 20 new hair and headwear styles to Memoji and Animoji, including face mask options for Memoji. Also, the user's email and browser apps – by default the stock Mail app and Safari – may now be changed. On iPhones released in 2017 and later (iPhone 8 and 8 Plus, iPhone X and newer), a new accessibility feature allows users to perform common tasks by double-tapping the back of the device via the phone's accelerometer (e.g. opening Control Center or running a shortcut). Users with devices that do not automatically read NFC tags may add a shortcut on the Control Center to do so. iOS 14 introduces support for the VP9 codec, allowing playback of YouTube videos in 4K resolution. In Safari, VP9 support is enabled through WebRTC, which is disabled by default. In the Notes app, it is now easier to find notes using an improved "on-device intelligence." The skeuomorphic paper texture in the app has also been removed. The Weather app now shows an air quality index and minute-by-minute forecasts for the next hour in the United States. Apple now uses additional weather data from their recently acquired service Dark Sky instead of only The Weather Channel. Apple Arcade now has direct integration with Gamecenter. The scroll wheel picker used for time has been reduced in size with the option to use a number pad. A new Accessibility feature, called Sound Recognition, allows iPhones to listen for predefined sounds and issue an alert whenever the specific audio is detected. This way an iPhone can detect fire, various sirens, animals, multiple household noises, and a baby that is crying or someone that's shouting. The Music icon was redesigned with a red gradient, similar to the icon used in iOS 7 through 8.3. The iOS 12 wallpaper was removed, and eight new wallpapers were added in iOS 14.2. Magnifier is now a separate app that can be accessed outside of the Control Center. People Detection was added in Measure on iOS 14.2. Unlocking an iPhone equipped with Face ID while wearing a mask, using a paired Apple Watch, was added on iOS 14.5 and watchOS 7.4.

== App features ==
=== Calendar ===
The Calendar app now supports a Julian calendar format for years earlier than October 15, 1582 and the Calendar app icon now uses abbreviated names for the days of the week.

=== Camera ===
The Camera app gained several new features. Features include:

- The ability to mirror photos taken from the front camera on iPhone XS and later.
- QR code reading enhancements.
- Exposure compensation control on iPhone 11 and iPhone SE (2nd generation) and later.
- Quick toggles in Video mode to change resolution and frame rate for all iPhones. Previously, this feature was limited to the iPhone 11 and iPhone 11 Pro.
- QuickTake video function for iPhone XR and iPhone XS.
- Camera UI from iPhone 11 and iPhone 11 Pro for the iPhone XR and the iPhone XS.
- The ability to capture burst photos and QuickTake video with volume buttons on supported devices.
- An updated Night mode capture experience on the iPhone 11 and iPhone 11 Pro.
- The PAL format video shooting.

Improvements were also made in shot-to-shot performance. According to Apple, photos can be shot up to 90% faster, time to first shot is now up to 25% faster, and Portrait shot-to-shot is up to 15% faster.

=== FaceTime ===
On iPhone XS and later, FaceTime now automatically adjusts the visual appearance of eyes to account for the camera being above where a caller's eyes are displayed, allowing for direct two-way eye contact. Additionally, if a caller is using sign language in a call with multiple people, their window will be focused on accordingly.

FaceTime on iPhone XS and later now supports 1080p video on Wi-Fi. iOS 14.2 added support for 1080p FaceTime video on iPhone 8 and later on Wi-Fi, and for 5G and Wi-Fi on iPhone 12.

FaceTime now supports picture-in-picture mode. This allows users to continue seeing the other person while multitasking between other apps. Double tapping on the FaceTime window allows for the size to be changed to small, medium, or large. A single tap expands the window back to full screen.

=== Home ===
The Home app received design changes to emphasize suggested accessories alongside those marked as favorite. In addition, a major set of automation capabilities were added for use with compatible HomeKit devices; this automation requires the presence of an iPad, HomePod or Apple TV to facilitate on-device processing.

Home security cameras may be instructed to only alert the user of activity if it occurs in a preselected activity zone. In addition, facial recognition performed in Photos app may be used to alert based on recognized people, with additional integration for use with smart doorbells.

Smart lighting products that support color temperatures may be instructed to match a preset color temperature setting. As the presence of blue light is a major zeitgeber – a factor which influences the perception of time with regards to circadian rhythm – this feature is designed to encourage activity in the day and calmness in the morning and evening.

=== Messages ===
In the Messages app, users can now pin up to nine individual conversations above other message threads.

Group chats using iMessage may be given a custom image, a Memoji, or an emoji. Users may now mention other users, and change notification settings to only be notified when explicitly mentioned. Messages may be replied to with inline replies, allowing for simultaneous conversation threads and see the replies in the general conversation or as a separate thread.

SMS filter: third-party apps that filter unwanted SMS from unknown senders can show the custom categories with which they classify these messages (e.g. transactions, promotions, spam) directly in the Messages app.

=== Maps ===
Apple Maps will now give users access to cycling routes, providing information including elevation and stairs. It also provides users with multiple options, suggesting routes with less busy streets. Cycling directions will be available at launch in New York, Los Angeles, San Francisco, Shanghai, and Beijing. Apple announced they will continue to roll out their enhanced maps detail to countries beyond the United States, including Canada, the United Kingdom and Ireland, and more in the future.

Apple also introduced EV routing, which allows users to take charging stations into account while planning their route and choose a route where they will be able to recharge when they need to. This feature requires integration with the car. Apple is currently working with Ford and BMW to implement this feature with their electric vehicles.

Curated guides for various places around the world have been added, which suggest where to eat, shop, and explore.

=== Safari ===
Safari, the default web browser in iOS, gained the ability to monitor passwords for data breaches and generate privacy reports for trackers on websites. Major improvements were made to JavaScript performance.

A web page translation tool has been added to Safari in seven languages: English, Spanish, Simplified Chinese, French, German, Russian and Brazilian Portuguese. This feature was only available in the United States and Canada at launch, but has started rolling out to more countries since then.

=== Translate ===
Introduced in iOS 14, the stock Translate app allows users to translate voice and text between 11 languages: English, Spanish, Mandarin Chinese, Japanese, Korean, Russian, German, French, Italian, Brazilian Portuguese, and Arabic. When rotated to landscape view, the app features an "attention mode", making it easier for someone to read a translation. It can be used during verbal conversations between speakers of different languages. The Translate app can auto-detect which of the two chosen languages is being spoken and convert it to the other language.

Improvements made to translation are integrated with Siri, and pages may be translated inline in Safari.

== Supported devices ==
All iPhones and iPod Touches that support iOS 13 also support iOS 14.

=== iPhone ===
- iPhone 6s & 6s Plus
- iPhone SE (1st generation)
- iPhone 7 & 7 Plus
- iPhone 8 & 8 Plus
- iPhone X
- iPhone XS & XS Max
- iPhone XR
- iPhone 11
- iPhone 11 Pro & 11 Pro Max
- iPhone SE (2nd generation)
- iPhone 12 & 12 Mini
- iPhone 12 Pro & 12 Pro Max

=== iPod Touch ===
- iPod Touch (7th generation)

== Version history ==
The first developer beta of iOS 14 was released on June 22, 2020, and the first public beta was released on July 9, 2020. The final beta, iOS 14 beta 8, was released on September 9, 2020. iOS 14 was officially released on September 16, 2020. There was no public beta testing of 14.1.

iOS 14 releases
Version	Build	Codename	Release date	Release notes
14.0	18A373	Azul	September 16, 2020	Release notes Security content
14.0.1	18A393	Azul	September 24, 2020	Release notes
14.1 (Note: Initial release for the iPhone 12 and iPhone 12 Pro)	18A8395	AzulHW	October 20, 2020	Release notes
14.2 (Note: Initial release for the iPhone 12 Mini and iPhone 12 Pro Max)	18B92	AzulB	November 5, 2020	Release notes Security content
14.2	18B111 (Note: Bugfix release for iPhone 12 and iPhone 12 Pro models only)	AzulB	November 18, 2020	Release notes Security content
14.2.1 (Note: Bug fix release, exclusive to the iPhone 12 lineup)	18B121	AzulB	November 19, 2020	Release notes
14.3	18C66	AzulC	December 14, 2020	Release notes Security content
14.4	18D52	AzulD	January 26, 2021	Release notes Security content
14.4.1	18D61	AzulD	March 8, 2021	Security content
14.4.2	18D70	AzulD	March 26, 2021	Security content
14.5	18E199 18E198	AzulE	April 26, 2021 April 30, 2021	Release notes Security content
14.5.1	18E212	AzulE	May 3, 2021	Release notes Security content
14.6	18F72	AzulF	May 24, 2021	Release notes Security content
14.7	18G69	AzulG	July 19, 2021	Release notes Security content
14.7.1	18G82	AzulG	July 26, 2021	Release notes Security content
14.8	18H17	AzulSecuritySky	September 13, 2021	Release notes Security content
14.8.1	18H107	AzulSecuritySkyB	October 26, 2021	Security content

See Apple's official release notes, and official security update contents.

== Reception ==
iOS 14 was widely celebrated as one of the most transformative updates in the IPhone's history, primarily for breaking the rigid grid of icons that existed ever since the original. However, it was shadow dropped at its initial launch, leading to many issues for many app developers.

== See also ==
- iPadOS 14
- macOS Big Sur
- tvOS 14
- watchOS 7

Preceded by iOS 13	iOS 14; 2020	Succeeded by iOS 15
