= IOS 12 =

2018 mobile operating system

iOS 12
- Version of the iOS operating system

- iOS 12 home screen on an iPhone XS Max
- Developer: Apple
- Working state: No longer supported
- Source model: Closed-source with open source components
- Initial release: September 17, 2018; 8 years ago
- Latest release: 12.4.1 (iPhone 6s and later) (August 26, 2019; 7 years ago); 12.5.8 (iPhone 5s, iPhone 6, iPhone 6 Plus, iPad Air, iPad Mini 2, iPad Mini 3, and iPod Touch (6th generation) only) (January 26, 2026; 9 months ago) [±]
- Marketing target: Smartphones, tablets and digital media players
- Update method: OTA updates, iTunes
- Package manager: App Store
- Kernel type: Hybrid (XNU)
- License: Proprietary software with open-source components
- Preceded by: iOS 11
- Succeeded by: iOS 13 (iPhones and 7th generation iPod touch); iPadOS 13 (iPads)
- Official website: iOS 12 - Apple at the Wayback Machine (archived September 9, 2019)
- Tagline: More power to you.

Support status
- Obsolete, unsupported

iOS 12 is the twelfth major release of the iOS mobile operating system developed by Apple. Aesthetically similar to its predecessor, iOS 11, it focuses more on performance than on new features, quality improvements and security updates. Announced at the company's Worldwide Developers Conference on June 4, 2018, iOS 12 was released to the public on September 17, 2018. It was succeeded for the iPhone and iPod Touch by iOS 13 on September 19, 2019, and for the iPad by iPadOS 13 on September 24, 2019.

Security updates for iOS 12 continued for four years after the releases of iOS 13 and iPadOS 13 for devices unable to run the newer versions. The last update, version 12.5.8, was released on January 26, 2026, to extend an expiring certificate to allow iMessage, FaceTime, and device activation to work past 2027, notably over three years after the previous update (in 2023) and over seven years since the release of iOS 12. The signing thereof was paused by Apple after Telstra was made aware of an "issue preventing some older Apple devices from connecting to our network, including calls to 000", stating that they are currently "working on this as a priority with Apple". iOS 15.8.6, iOS 16.7.13, and iOS 18.7.4 were also allegedly affected. The issue was later resolved and the updates re-released.

== Overview ==
iOS 12 was introduced by Craig Federighi at the Apple Worldwide Developers Conference keynote address on June 4, 2018. The first developer beta version was released after the keynote presentation, with the first public beta released on June 25, 2018. The initial release of version 12.0 was on September 17, 2018.

== System features ==
=== Performance ===
Performance optimizations were made in order to speed up common tasks across all supported iOS devices. Tests done by Apple on an iPhone 6 Plus showed apps launching 40% faster, the system keyboard activating 50% faster, and the camera opening 70% faster compared to iOS 11.

=== Screen Time ===
The Screen Time usage information screen in iOS 12 on an iPhone X

Screen Time is a new feature in iOS 12 that records the amount of time a user spent on the device. The feature also displays the amount of time the user used particular apps, the amount of time the user used particular categories of apps (such as games), and the number of notifications the user received.

Screen Time also provides blocking features to limit usage of apps (with time limits) or set other restrictions such as on purchases or explicit content. It replaces Restrictions in the iOS Settings app, but can also be used by adults to limit their own usage. These features can be used with or without a passcode. Without setting a passcode, the limits can easily be bypassed but may serve as a useful reminder of usage goals.

In January 2018, investors JANA Partners and the California State Teachers' Retirement System had issued a public letter to Apple, calling for them to take additional responsibility for the "unintentional negative consequences" that iPhones may have on younger users, and to seek out new ways to limit these effects. In June 2018, after the announcement of the Screen Time feature, Tim Cook publicly admitted that he "was spending a lot more time than [he] should" on his phone. JANA Partners and CalSTRS issued a second letter to express their support for the new feature.

=== Shortcuts ===
A dedicated application in iOS 12 allows users to set up Shortcuts, automated actions that the user can ask Siri to perform. Using the Shortcuts app, a user can create a phrase and type in the action they want Siri to do for them. Once they tell the phrase to Siri, Siri will automatically do the task they set for it in the Shortcuts app. The Shortcuts app replaces the Workflow app that Apple acquired in March 2017.

=== ARKit 2 ===
ARKit now allows users to share their view with other iOS 12-supported devices. ARKit 2 additionally allows full 2D image tracking and incorporates the ability to detect 3D objects.

=== CarPlay ===
CarPlay now supports third-party navigation applications. (Waze, Google Maps, etc.)

=== iPad ===
The Voice Memos and Stocks apps are now available for iPads.

Control Center is separated from the app switcher on iPad and can be opened with a swipe down on the top right corner. The status bar has been redesigned, and in addition, iPhone X-style gestures are introduced across all iPads running iOS 12.

=== Keyboard ===
In iOS 12, the trackpad mode (which allows the user to freely move the cursor) is enabled by long-pressing the space bar on devices without 3D Touch.

=== App Switcher ===
For devices with gesture navigation and no home button (iPhone X and later), users can now force quit applications by swiping up from the bottom of the screen (without having to press and hold on them when in the app switcher).

=== Exposure Notification API ===
On December 14, 2020, Apple released iOS 12.5, which includes the Exposure Notification API (backported from iOS 13) that provides access to the privacy-preserving contact tracing system that Apple have developed jointly with Google. This is provided to support digital contact tracing which came to light during the COVID-19 pandemic.

=== Hardware components verification ===
Since iPhone XS, iPhone XR and iOS 12, iPhone verifies hardware components on every boot time; if a non-Apple screen and/or non-Apple battery is found, iOS will display “non-genuine screen” and/or “non-genuine battery” prompt on iOS settings, and the battery health information is unavailable. Later, iOS 18.1 enabled the display of the battery health information of a non-Apple battery.

== App features ==
=== Messages ===
Messages in iOS 12 introduces a new type of customizable Animoji called "Memoji" which allows a user to create a 3D character of themselves. Apple also introduced koala, tiger, ghost, and T-Rex Animojis. In addition, Apple added new text and GIF effects similar to those found on other social media applications.

=== FaceTime ===
FaceTime gains support for Animoji and Memoji, as well as new text and GIF effects similar to those found on other social media applications and in the Messages application.

iOS 12.1, released on October 30, 2018, adds the ability to include up to 32 people in a FaceTime conversation. This feature is only supported with video by devices with the Apple A8X or Apple A9 chip or later; it is only supported for audio on iPhone 5s, iPhone 6, and iPhone 6 Plus, and is not available at all on iPad Mini 2, iPad Mini 3, and iPad Air (1st generation). Group FaceTime was disabled on January 28, 2019, due to a software bug that allowed calls to be answered by the caller rather than the recipient, allowing video and audio to be transmitted unless the call was declined. The functionality got restored on February 7, 2019, with the release of iOS 12.1.4. Group FaceTime remains disabled on devices running iOS 12 that are affected by the bug.

=== Measure ===
Measure is a native AR application that allows the user to take measurements of real objects. It also works as a level, a feature that was originally packaged as part of the Compass app.

=== Photos ===
Photos has been completely redesigned with four new tabs, including "Photos," "For You," "Albums," and "Search." The new "For You" tab replaces the "Memories" tab previously found in iOS 11 and makes sharing recommendations, creates short-length video collages, photo editing suggestions, as well as featured photos from a specific day.

While the "Photos" and "Albums" tabs received only a few cosmetic changes, the "Search" tab includes new Artificial Intelligence and Machine Learning features which show the user photos by place and categories (e.g. animals, cars, objects).

=== Notifications ===
Notifications are now grouped by application and have a "manage" button to turn off notifications for that app or to deliver them quietly right from the Notification Center without having to go into the Settings application.

=== Do Not Disturb ===
Do Not Disturb gives users more options for automation. Users can hide notifications indefinitely or scheduled like previously, but can also hide notifications for 1 hour, until a time of day, until leaving a location, or until the end of a scheduled event in Calendar.

=== Voice Memos and Stocks ===
Voice Memos and Stocks are supported on iPad, and have a newer design. Stocks was integrated with Apple News to show financial and other related news.

=== Apple Books ===
iBooks was renamed Apple Books, and the app was redesigned, with five new tabs, including "Reading Now," "Library," "Book Store," "Audio Books," and "Search." The new app design is similar to that of Apple Music, and has been praised for its simplicity in allowing users to easily navigate their book library.

=== Safari ===
Safari receives an update to Intelligent Tracking Prevention. This includes a feature which allows the user to disable social media "like" and "share" buttons.

=== Maps ===
Apple Maps had started to be rebuilt from the ground up by relying on first-party map data instead of using map data provided by third parties. This allows for more accurate directions and predictions on the fastest routes. The new maps were rolled out in sections and the entire US completed by the end of 2019.

== Problems ==
=== Rainbow flag emoji ===
After a rainbow flag emoji with an interdictory sign over it appeared on Twitter, several users accused Apple of encouraging anti-LGBT attitudes. However, Emojipedia has clarified that this occurs when a user tweets the two emojis together and is not an intended feature. This can be used with other emojis as well.

=== FaceTime eavesdropping issue ===
A FaceTime issue impacting several versions of iOS 12 (versions 12.1–12.1.3) allowed users to call someone via FaceTime and hear the audio coming from their phone before answering the call, before the bug was fixed in iOS 12.1.4.

== Supported devices ==
All devices that support iOS 11 support iOS 12. However, devices with 1 GB of RAM, A7 and certain A8 chip processors have limited support, (Note: Animoji, Memoji, AR app support, the Measure app, and Message photo filters are not available on devices with less than 2 GB of RAM and older than the iPad Air 2.) which include the iPhone 5s, iPhone 6 & 6 Plus, iPod Touch (6th generation), iPad Air (1st generation), iPad Mini 2 and iPad Mini 3.

=== iPhone ===
- iPhone 5s
- iPhone 6 & 6 Plus
- iPhone 6s & 6s Plus
- iPhone SE (1st generation)
- iPhone 7 & 7 Plus
- iPhone 8 & 8 Plus
- iPhone X
- iPhone XS & XS Max
- iPhone XR

=== iPod Touch ===
- iPod Touch (6th generation)
- iPod Touch (7th generation)

=== iPad ===
- iPad Air (1st generation)
- iPad Air 2
- iPad Air (3rd generation)
- iPad (5th generation)
- iPad (6th generation)
- iPad Mini 2
- iPad Mini 3
- iPad Mini 4
- iPad Mini (5th generation)
- iPad Pro (9.7-inch)
- iPad Pro (10.5-inch)
- iPad Pro (11-inch, 1st generation)
- iPad Pro (12.9-inch, 1st generation)
- iPad Pro (12.9-inch, 2nd generation)
- iPad Pro (12.9-inch, 3rd generation)

== Version history ==
Version	Build	Codename	Release date	Notes
12.0	16A366	Peace	September 17, 2018	Initial release on the iPhone XS and XS Max: Allows searching for photos based on their geotag information; Introduces Memoji, a customizable Animoji; Adds a Deliver Quietly feature for the Do Not Disturb feature, which silently delivers notifications; Adds the Siri Suggestions panel to Lock Screen and Search; Enables Siri to turn on the flashlight; Introduces the Measure app, which uses Augmented Reality to measure objects and spaces; Speed and performance improvements.; Fixes a bug that allows applications to read the user's Apple ID; Fixes a bug that allows maliciously crafted iBooks file to access user information; Fixes a bug that allowed local users to recover deleted messages; Fixes a bug that prevented a user from deleting browser history
12.0	16A367 (Note: iPhone XR only)	Peace	October 26, 2018	Initial release on iPhone XR
12.0.1	16A404; 16A405 (Note: iPhone XS, iPhone XS Max and iPhone XR only)	Peace	October 8, 2018	Fixes an issue where some iPhone XS devices did not immediately start charging when connected to a Lightning cable that was capable of charging.; Resolves an issue that caused some iPhone XS units to rejoin Wi-Fi networks at 2.4 GHz instead of 5 GHz.; Restores the original position of the ".?123" key on the iPad.; Fixes an issue where subtitles failed to appear in some 3rd party video apps.; Fixes an issue where Bluetooth could become unavailable.; Strengthens the security on the lock screen due to local attackers being able to access photos, contacts, and the share function on a locked device.
12.1	16B92; 16B93; 16B94 (Note: Re-release of 12.1 for iPhone XR only on November 6, 2018)	PeaceB	October 30, 2018; November 6, 2018	Initial release on iPad Pro (3rd generation); Introduces Group FaceTime support, which allows up to 32 simultaneous participants in a call.; Adds dual SIM support using eSIMs for the iPhone XS, iPhone XS Max, and iPhone XR.; Introduces Depth Control in Camera preview for iPhone XS, iPhone XS Max, and iPhone XR.; Fixes a bug where messages were merged into one thread if two users were signed into the same Apple ID on separate devices, Resolves an issue where a contact name could fail to appear alongside a phone number.; Fixes a bug where no family members could be added or removed from Family Sharing.; Adds the ability for an iPhone XS, iPhone XS Max, or iPhone XR to detect if the battery installed is a genuine Apple battery; Adds a performance management feature to prevent sudden shutdowns for an iPhone 8, iPhone 8 Plus, or iPhone X, with the ability to disable this.; Fixes bug that allows a remote attacker to forcefully initiate a FaceTime call.
12.1.1	16C50	PeaceC	December 5, 2018	Adds the ability to use separate carriers with dual SIM functionality.; Allows Live Photo capture during one-to-one FaceTime calls.; Allows switching between front and rear cameras with one tap in FaceTime.; Fixes an issue where Face ID may become unavailable.; Fixes issue where time zones did not update automatically.; Fixes issue in Messages that prevented predictive text suggestions when using Chinese or Japanese keyboards.; Increased lock screen security to prevent local attackers from accessing Contacts from the lock screen.; Fixes bug that prevents fully deleting browser history.
12.1.2	16C101; 16C104 (Note: Re-release of 12.1.2 for all iPhones on December 20, 2018)	PeaceC	December 17, 2018; December 20, 2018	Only for iPhones: Fixes bugs with eSIM activation for iPhone XS, iPhone XS Max, and iPhone XR.; Fixes an issue where cellular connectivity was affected in Turkey for iPhone XS, iPhone XS Max, and iPhone XR.
12.1.3	16D39; 16D40 (Note: iPhone XS, iPhone XS Max, iPhone XR and iPad Pro (3rd generation) only)	PeaceD	January 22, 2019	Fixes issue that may cause artifacting in images sent from the Share Sheet.; Fixes issue that caused some CarPlay systems to disconnect from iPhone XS, iPhone XS Max, and iPhone XR.; Fixes another issue that allowed a remote attacker to forcefully initiate a FaceTime call.
12.1.4	16D57	PeaceD	February 7, 2019	Fixes a bug where the initiator of a Group FaceTime call can force all of the recipients to answer.
12.2	16E227	PeaceE	March 25, 2019	Initial release on iPad Air (3rd generation) and iPad Mini (5th generation): Introduces Apple News+, a subscription service for Apple news.; Enables Ask Siri to allow play any video, show, movie, sports game, or channel on an Apple TV.; Introduces four new Animoji faces - owl, boar, giraffe, shark, for iPhone X and later.; Adds AirPlay controls into Control Center; Adds support for the AirPods (2nd generation).; Adds support for Air Quality Index in the US, UK, and India.; Fixes bug where the reported size of large apps, System, and Other could be reported incorrectly in the iPhone Storage section of settings.; Fixes a bug where an attacker could intercept network traffic.; Fixes a bug where websites could access sensor information without user consent.; Fixes a bug where websites could access the microphone without the microphone usage indicator being shown.
12.3	16F156	PeaceF	May 13, 2019	Initial release on iPod Touch (7th generation): Introduces AirPlay 2; Introduces the Apple TV app, replacing the TV app, which lets users access Apple TV shows from their iPhone or iPad.; Fixes bugs where apps could cause unexpected shutdowns
12.3	16F8155 (Note: iPod Touch (7th generation) only)	PeaceF	May 28, 2019	Initial release on iPod Touch (7th generation): Introduces AirPlay 2; Introduces the Apple TV app, replacing the TV app, which lets users access Apple TV shows from their iPhone or iPad.; Fixes bugs where apps could cause unexpected shutdowns
12.3.1	16F203	PeaceF	May 24, 2019	Fixes bug preventing use of VoLTE calls; Fixes issue that allowed messages from unknown senders to appear in Messages despite Filter Unknown Senders being enabled; Fixes issue that prevented the Report Junk link from appearing in a message from an unknown sender
12.3.1	16F8202	PeaceF	May 29, 2019	Fixes bug preventing use of VoLTE calls; Fixes issue that allowed messages from unknown senders to appear in Messages despite Filter Unknown Senders being enabled; Fixes issue that prevented the Report Junk link from appearing in a message from an unknown sender
12.3.2	16F250	PeaceF	June 10, 2019	Exclusive to the iPhone 8 Plus, resolving an issue that could cause Camera to capture Portrait mode photos without depth effect on some devices
12.4	16G77	PeaceG	July 22, 2019	Adds support for the Apple Card.; Adds the ability to wirelessly transfer data between iPhones running iOS 12.4 or newer in Setup.; Makes all of the downloaded magazines in News available offline.
12.4.1	16G102	PeaceG	August 26, 2019	Undoes a vulnerability fix reversal from the previous release
Exclusive to iOS devices not supported by iOS 13 (iPhone 5s, iPhone 6/6 Plus, iPad Air, iPad Mini 2, iPad Mini 3, and iPod Touch (6th generation))
12.4.2 (Note: iOS 12.4.2 firmware was not "officially" released for the iPhone 6S/6S Plus, iPhone SE (1st generation), iPad Air 2, and iPad mini 4, but the firmware fully supported these devices and it was possible for them to update to it.)	16G114	PeaceG	September 26, 2019	Fixes bug that allows applications to read restricted memory
12.4.3	16G130	PeaceG	October 28, 2019	Fixes bug that allows AirDrop transfers to be forcefully accepted when the receiver is in Everyone mode
12.4.4	16G140	PeaceSecYukonC	December 10, 2019	Fixes bug that allows a malicious video sent by FaceTime to lead to arbitrary code execution
12.4.5	16G161	PeaceSecYukonD	January 28, 2020	Security fixes, no published CVE entries
12.4.6	16G183	PeaceSecYukonE	March 24, 2020	Security fixes, no published CVE entries
12.4.7	16G192	PeaceSecYukonF	May 20, 2020	Fixes bugs in the Mail app that allowed kernel corruption and panics
12.4.8	16G201	PeaceSecYukonG	July 15, 2020	Security fixes, no published CVE entries
12.4.9	16H5	PeaceUpdate	November 5, 2020	Fixes bug that allowed users in Group FaceTime to enable video without being notified of it.; Fixes bug that allowed maliciously crafted font to gain arbitrary code execution.; Fixes bugs with the kernel that allows disclosing of kernel memory and arbitrary code execution with kernel privileges.
12.5	16H20	PeaceUpdate	December 14, 2020	Adds opt-in for COVID-19 exposure notifications on iPhone 5S and iPhone 6/6 Plus.; Fixes bug where unauthorized code execution led to violation of authentication policy.
12.5.1	16H22	PeaceUpdate	January 11, 2021	Fixes an issue where Exposure Notifications could incorrectly display logging profile language on the iPhone 5S and the iPhone 6/6 Plus.
12.5.2	16H30	PeaceUpdate	March 26, 2021	Fixes bug where processing of maliciously crafted web content may lead to universal cross-site scripting
12.5.3	16H41	PeaceUpdate	May 3, 2021	Fixes bugs where processing of maliciously crafted web content may lead to arbitrary code execution.
12.5.4	16H50	PeaceUpdate	June 14, 2021	Fixes bugs where processing of maliciously crafted web content may lead to arbitrary code execution.; Fixes bug where processing of maliciously crafted security certificate may lead to arbitrary code execution.
12.5.5	16H62	PeaceUpdate	September 23, 2021	Fixes bug where processing a maliciously crafted PDF leads to arbitrary code execution.; Fixes bug where processing maliciously crafted web content may lead to arbitrary code execution.; Fixes bug where a malicious application is able to gain arbitrary code execution with kernel privileges.
12.5.6	16H71	PeaceUpdate	August 31, 2022	Fixes bug where processing maliciously crafted web content may lead to arbitrary code execution.
12.5.7	16H81	PeaceUpdate	January 23, 2023	Fixes a vulnerability where processing maliciously crafted web content may lead to arbitrary code execution.
12.5.8	16H88	PeaceUpdate	January 26, 2026	This update extends the certificate required by features such as iMessage, FaceTime, and device activation to continue working after January 2027.

== Reception ==
iOS 12 was widely acclaimed as one of Apple's most stable and refined updates, praised for revitalizing older devices and prioritizing performance over flashy aesthetic changes.

== See also ==
- macOS Mojave
- tvOS 12
- watchOS 5

Preceded by iOS 11	iOS 12; 2018	Succeeded by iOS 13 iPadOS 13
