= IOS 16 =

2022 mobile operating system

iOS 16
- Version of the iOS operating system

- iOS 16 home screen on an iPhone 14 Pro
- Developer: Apple
- Written in: C, C++, Objective-C, Swift, assembly language
- Working state: No longer supported
- General availability: September 12, 2022; 4 years ago
- Latest release: 16.7.2 (iPhone XS and later) (October 25, 2023; 3 years ago) [±] 16.7.16 (iPhone 8, iPhone 8 Plus, and iPhone X only) (May 11, 2026; 5 months ago) [±]
- Available in: 41 languages
- Kernel type: Hybrid (XNU)
- License: Proprietary software with open-source components
- Preceded by: iOS 15
- Succeeded by: iOS 17
- Official website: iOS 16 at the Wayback Machine (archived August 2, 2023)
- Tagline: Personal is powerful.

Support status
- Obsolete, unsupported.

Articles in the series

iOS 16 is the sixteenth major release of Apple's iOS mobile operating system for the iPhone. It is the successor of iOS 15, and was announced at the company's Worldwide Developers Conference (WWDC) on June 6, 2022, alongside iPadOS 16, and released on September 12, 2022. It was succeeded by iOS 17 on September 18, 2023.

It is the first iOS release to be exclusive to iPhones, as it drops support for the seventh-generation iPod Touch. The iPhone 7 and 7 Plus, iPhone 6s and 6s Plus, and first-generation iPhone SE would also be dropped. It is also the final iOS release to support the iPhone 8 and 8 Plus and iPhone X, as iOS 17 dropped support for these iPhones in 2023.

== System features ==
=== Freeform ===
Freeform is a whiteboard app that lets users collaborate in real time. The whiteboard is an "Infinite" space where users can draw, import files, FaceTime, message, all fluently in sync.

=== AirDrop ===
In iOS 16.2, the default setting is "Contacts Only", and the "Everyone" setting was changed to "Everyone for 10 Minutes," which reverts to "Contacts Only" after 10 minutes "to prevent unwanted requests to receive content." This was enabled in iOS 16.1.1 for iPhones in China.

=== Lock screen ===
- The lock screen's appearance is customizable and can host Widgets. The font and text color for the date and time can be customized to 8 presets and color effects can be applied to the entire lock screen. The date is now above the time and a small widget can be added next to the date. Other widgets can be added and arranged horizontally on the third row, below the time.
- Multiple lock screens can be set up.
- Live wallpapers have been removed because of the new tap and hold gesture that would allow users to customize their lock screen.
- The lock screen also supports landscape mode, arranging elements horizontally instead of vertically when the phone orientation is horizontal.
- When listening to podcasts and music, tapping the album cover will cause the cover to appear full-sized in the center of the lock screen with a color-matched background.

=== Improved focus mode ===
- Different lock screens can be set up based on the active focus.
- Focus filters allow apps to show different content based on active focus. For example, Safari will only show work-related tabs if the user enables 'Work focus'. Likewise, the Mail app will only show email messages from an allowed list of work contacts.
- The user can create lists of apps and contacts to be silenced and lists of those to be allowed.

=== Notifications ===
- Notifications roll up from below the lock screen, rather than above.
- It is possible to show notifications in three different styles: count, stack or list. Notifications can be grouped together with two fingers to reduce them to a counter.
- "Live Activities" show a UI within a large notification that always stays on screen, and continuously updates to show users real time activity. (Useful for watching the score of a sports game live when the user is not watching, etc.)

=== Control Center ===
- A new drop-down menu in Control Center shows all apps that have recently accessed the camera, microphone or location, new control center toggle for quick notes.
- The sound recognition Shazam feature integrates its history with the main Shazam application's history, instead of the histories being separated.

=== Status bar ===
The status bar can display the battery percentage on iPhones with Face ID, so the user doesn't need to pull-down the Control Center to see it.

=== Improved dictation ===
During text dictation, the keyboard is always present and allows the user to switch from speech to manual typing and vice versa without interruptions. It is also possible to insert emojis through dictation. Auto-Punctuation automatically inserts a period when there is a pause in the dictation.

=== Improved Live Text ===
- Ability to select and manipulate text in videos.
- Quick actions are commands available directly on the Live Text. It is possible to make price conversions to another currency or translate text on the fly.
- Support expanded to Japanese, Korean, and Ukrainian.

=== Improved Visual Search ===
- Visual Search is able to extract objects and people recognized in photos; they can be interacted with to do things such as drag and drop them into other apps.

=== Siri improvements ===
- It is possible to end cellular and FaceTime calls by simply saying "Hey Siri, hang up".
- Siri can announce notifications on speaker.

=== Spotlight ===
- A new button to access Spotlight directly from the Home Screen.
- The search input text box is now anchored to the keyboard, instead of being at the top, in order to be more accessible using the phone with one hand.
- More image results from apps like Messages, Notes, and Files.
- Quick actions like starting a timer or running a shortcut.

=== Translate ===
- Allows the user to activate the Camera to translate text that is recognized live.
- Adds support for Dutch, Indonesian, Polish, Thai, Turkish, and Vietnamese.

=== Spoken Content ===
- New voice options have been added for some supported languages (including “Novelty” voices for English), and voices and support have been added for the following languages:
  - Bangla
  - Basque
  - Bhojpuri
  - Bulgarian
  - Catalan
  - Croatian
  - Galician
  - Kannada
  - Malay
  - Marathi
  - Persian
  - Shanghainese
  - Slovenian
  - Tamil
  - Telugu
  - Ukrainian
  - Vietnamese
- "Premium" options have been added for a few specific voices.
- Users can play samples of voices before downloading them.

=== Improved accessibility ===
- Door detection is a feature that allows visually impaired people to be guided by the camera. It is able to recognize the presence of a door and signals how many meters away it is.
- A new accessibility setting allows the user to prevent phone calls from being ended by locking the phone.

=== Wi-Fi network improvements ===
Previously saved Wi-Fi networks are shown which can be edited, deleted or selected to view the network password after authentication via Face ID or Touch ID. Prior to this change, users’ only option for removing previously connected-to networks was to tap ‘forget this network’ from within the settings app which could only be done if connected to that network. Users also had (and still have) the ability to wipe all previously known networks from their iOS devices by choosing ‘erase network settings’ from Settings–>General–>Transfer or reset iPhone(at bottom)–>Reset–>Reset Network Settings. The latter option is frequently advised to those seeking to fix a multitude of both Wi-Fi and cellular network issues arising on users iOS devices.

=== Cellular network improvements ===
During the configuration of the Cellular Network, the eSIM from another iPhone can be transferred via Bluetooth.

=== Backup ===
Backups to iCloud can also be made on 4G, alongside 5G and Wi-Fi.

=== Face ID ===
Face ID works when the phone is oriented horizontally. It is limited to the iPhone 13 and later.

=== Keyboard ===
Haptic feedback can be enabled for the keyboard; while typing text a small vibration can be felt which simulates the pressing of mechanical keys.

=== Controller support ===
iOS 16, iPadOS 16, and tvOS 16 have support for connecting Nintendo Switch Joy-Con and Pro Controllers.

=== Augmented reality ===
A new framework dubbed RoomPlan will allow apps to quickly create 3D floor plans of rooms using the LiDAR Scanner introduced with the iPhone 12 Pro and iPhone 12 Pro Max.

== App features ==
=== Messages ===
- Sent messages can be edited within 15 minutes and can be deleted within 2 minutes.
- Ability to mark an entire discussion as unread.
- SharePlay is now available in the Messages app to watch a movie or listen to music with friends, without requiring them to make a FaceTime call.
- Recover deleted messages for up to 30 days.
- Collaboration: ability to invite someone to work on a project, so that every time someone edits a shared document, the user receives updates in a thread of the Messages app. It works with iOS apps such as Files, Keynote, Numbers, Pages, Notes, Reminders, Safari, and third-party apps designed to take advantage of this Collaboration feature.
- On audio messages previously sent or received, users can swipe with the finger on the sound wave graph to position at the exact point.
- Ability to report SMS/MMS junk to carriers.

=== FaceTime ===
Live Captions automatically transcribes what is said during a FaceTime call.

=== Mail ===
- Mail messages can be scheduled to be sent later.
- Recently 'sent' emails can be canceled within ten seconds.
- Ability to put on top and set a reminder for messages the user hasn't responded to yet.
- Improved search corrects typos based on the content of their messages.
- New rich links give email messages more context and details at a glance.

=== Maps ===
- Multi-stop routing is now available. Multiple intermediate stops can be added to routes, with a maximum of 15 stops. Users can also ask Siri to add a new stop point while they are navigating.
- Pay in Transit, now can calculate cost of fares.
- New MapKit features supporting Look Around and the Detailed City Experience.

=== Photos ===
- Photos can be shared from the user's library with five different contacts. Shared photos can be edited or deleted freely by these contacts.
- The Hidden and Recently Deleted albums are now protected by Face ID or Touch ID, unless the user turns this off in Settings.
- It is now possible to copy filters and effects from an image to other images.
- It is possible to search for certain text inside of images.
- When cropping photos, there is now a Wallpaper format which will crop the photo to the same aspect ratio as the devices display.
- Automatic duplicate detection automatically detects and groups duplicate photos or videos together. The higher quality version will be kept and the relevant data of the duplicates will be merged into the kept photo.

=== Camera ===
- While taking photos, there is a button to toggle between whether the photo will be automatically shared to their Shared Photo Library or only be saved to their personal photo library.
- The Camera app has the live translate feature built into the viewfinder.

=== Safari ===
- Shared tab groups: Groups of tabs can be shared with others to work on them together and see in real time which tab others are looking at.
- Pinned tabs: in the opened tabs view, tabs can be pinned to the top.
- Tab group start pages: each tab group can have a different start page containing Favorites, Frequently Visited, etc.
- Extension syncing: users can view which extensions are installed on other devices and decide to install them on the current device. After they are installed, they are synced across all devices and are enabled on one device, so that they enable on all of them.
- Website Settings syncing: website settings such as Page Zoom, Request Desktop website, Use Reader automatically, etc. can be synced across all devices, so just set them on one device that are automatically set to all others.
- Added support for AVIF image format.

=== Notes ===
- A quick note can be created directly from the Lock Screen.
- Quick notes can be created in any app using the share menu.

=== Contacts ===
- Duplicate contacts are now automatically detected and users can merge them individually.
- When sharing contacts, individual fields can be selected to only share that information.
- It is possible to group contacts into separate lists to better organize them and easily send an email to all the members of that list.
- Ability to export contact lists to file

=== Calendar ===
- It is now possible to copy and paste events between the various days of the calendar.

=== Files ===
- New Quick Actions on a file allow the user to convert an image to another format JPEG, PNG, HEIF and resize it to Small, Medium, Large, Original.

=== Tips ===
- The tips UI has been refreshed.

=== Books ===
- The toolbar containing the reading settings, search and bookmarks has been replaced by a pop-up panel placed in an icon at the bottom in order to increase the space available for the contents and also to be more accessible when using the phone with one hand.
- Ability to adjust the line spacing, character spacing, word spacing and activate the full justification for text.
- A new theme calibrates the page colors automatically based on the ambient light using True Tone.

=== Health ===
- Users can add and manage the medications they take.
- Sleep stages allows users to monitor the sleep phases detected by the Apple Watch.

=== Apple News ===
- New "My Sports" section for highlights, videos and news regarding sports teams. Users can add their favorite sports teams for use with My Sports.
- Expanded local news.
- New Favorites group.

=== Weather ===
- New forecast modules for details about air quality, local forecasts, etc.
- Hourly forecasts for the next 10 days, with minute-by-minute precipitation intensity over the next hour.
- More detailed and easier to understand interactive graphs have been added that show exact trends over time of temperature, wind, humidity, etc.
- Receive government notifications about severe weather events like tornadoes, winter storms, flash floods, etc.

=== Fitness ===
- The app is now available even if the user doesn't own an Apple Watch.

=== Home ===
- Introduced a new architecture for Apple Home. This update was originally released in iOS 16.2 and pulled, and reintroduced in iOS 16.4.
- Added support for the Matter standard for home automation.

=== Apple TV ===
iOS 16 allows cross-device connectivity in tvOS 16 for new experiences between Apple TV, Apple Watch, and iPhone. iOS 16 also removes most AirPlay functionality with the second and third generation Apple TV.

== Security and privacy ==
=== Lockdown Mode ===
Lockdown Mode is a special mode that, when activated, raises the security to the highest possible level by restricting some features of the operating system, apps and web platform, in order to protect users from the rarest and most sophisticated attacks.

Unlike many other security features, Lockdown Mode is regarded as an “extreme, optional” mode that is not intended to be activated by the majority of users. Rather, it is designed as a defense against advanced malware and mercenary spyware, such as clickless exploits or zero-click attacks, which are often hyper-targeted toward influential individuals such as journalists, diplomats, politicians, activists, lawyers, and high-profile business people.

It is possible to disable the Lockdown Mode on specific websites and apps by acting from the Safari's Website Settings and the Lockdown Mode's Web Browsing setting.

=== Passkeys ===
Passkeys allows the user to authenticate to services that implement WebAuthn across their devices without using passwords. Passkeys are generated by the phone and permission is granted via Face ID or Touch ID.

=== Safety Check ===
Safety Check resets all access permissions given to people, apps, and devices for an iCloud account when activated; this is designed to help those in abusive or divorced relationships.

=== Rapid Security Response ===
Important security updates are now distributed without requiring an entire OS update. Users can optionally remove the security updates, although the standard update will still include the security fixes.

=== Clipboard security improved ===
Applications and websites now require permission to copy from the clipboard.

=== Private Access Tokens ===
Private Access Tokens are a new technology that replaces CAPTCHAs and helps in identifying HTTP requests from legitimate devices and people without compromising their identity or personal information.

=== Brand Indicators for Message Identification ===
Brand Indicators for Message Identification (BIMI) helps users to easily verify authenticated emails sent by brands by displaying the brand's logo alongside the email's header.

== Supported devices ==
iOS 16 requires iPhones with an A11 Bionic on iPhone 8/8 Plus/iPhone X or later, which means it drops support for devices with an iPhone 6s/6s Plus and iPhone SE and iPhone 7/7 Plus and iPod Touch (7th generation) an A9/A10 Fusion SoC, officially marking the end of support for the iPod Touch. iOS 16 is the first version of iOS to drop support for iPhones without a 3.5 mm headphone jack. iOS 16 is the first version of iOS to drop support for an iPhone SE. However, iPhones with an A11 Bionic SoC have limited support (Note: Using cameras to track medications in the Health app, blurring foreground objects in portrait photos, ending cellular and FaceTime calls through Siri, and the drag-and-drop photo crop are not available on iPhones older than the iPhone XS/XS Max and XR.) while iPhones with an A12 Bionic SoC or newer (Note: iPhone XS, XS Max, XR) have full support.

- iPhone 8 & 8 Plus
- iPhone X
- iPhone XS & XS Max
- iPhone XR
- iPhone 11
- iPhone 11 Pro & 11 Pro Max
- iPhone SE (2nd generation)
- iPhone 12 & 12 Mini
- iPhone 12 Pro & 12 Pro Max
- iPhone 13 & 13 Mini
- iPhone 13 Pro & 13 Pro Max
- iPhone SE (3rd generation)
- iPhone 14 & 14 Plus
- iPhone 14 Pro & 14 Pro Max

== Version history ==
The first developer beta of iOS 16 was released on June 6, 2022. iOS 16 was officially released on September 12, 2022.

iOS 16 releases
Version	Build	Codename	Release date	Notes
16.0	20A362	Sydney	September 12, 2022	Security content
16.0.1	20A371	Sydney	September 14, 2022	Only available for iPhone 14 models.
16.0.2	20A380	Sydney	September 22, 2022	
16.0.3	20A392	Sydney	October 10, 2022	Security content
16.1	20B82	SydneyB	October 24, 2022	Security content
16.1.1	20B101	SydneyB	November 9, 2022	Security content
16.1.2	20B110	SydneyB	November 30, 2022	Security content
16.2	20C65	SydneyC	December 13, 2022	Security content
16.3	20D47	SydneyD	January 23, 2023	Security content
16.3.1	20D67	SydneyD	February 13, 2023	Security content
16.4	20E247	SydneyE	March 27, 2023	Security content
16.4.1	20E252	SydneyE	April 7, 2023	Security content
16.4.1 (a)	20E772520a	SydneyE	May 1, 2023	
16.5	20F66	SydneyF	May 18, 2023	Security content
16.5.1	20F75	SydneyF	June 21, 2023	Security content
16.5.1 (a)	20F770750b	SydneyF	July 10, 2023	Security content
16.5.1 (c)	20F770750d	SydneyF	July 12, 2023	Security content
16.6	20G75	SydneyG	July 24, 2023	Security content
16.6.1	20G81	SydneyG	September 7, 2023	Security content
16.7	20H19	SydneySecurityDawn	September 21, 2023	Security content
16.7.1	20H30	SydneySecurityDawn	October 10, 2023	Security content
16.7.2	20H115	SydneySecurityDawnB	October 25, 2023	Security content
16.7.3	20H232	SydneySecurityDawnC	December 11, 2023	Security content. All later updates are only available for devices not supported by iOS 17: iPhone 8, iPhone 8 Plus and iPhone X.
16.7.4	20H240	SydneySecurityDawnC	December 19, 2023	
16.7.5	20H307	SydneyUpdate	January 22, 2024	Security content
16.7.6	20H320	SydneyUpdate	March 5, 2024	Security content
16.7.7	20H330	SydneyUpdate	March 21, 2024	Security content
16.7.8	20H343	SydneyUpdate	May 13, 2024	Security content
16.7.9	20H348	SydneyUpdate	July 29, 2024	Security content
16.7.10	20H350	SydneyUpdate	August 7, 2024	
16.7.11	20H360	SydneyUpdate	March 31, 2025	Security content
16.7.12	20H364	SydneyUpdate	September 15, 2025	Security content
16.7.13	20H365	SydneyUpdate	January 26, 2026	
16.7.14	20H370	SydneyUpdate	February 2, 2026	
16.7.15	20H380	SydneyUpdate	March 11, 2026	Security content
16.7.16	20H392	SydneyUpdate	May 11, 2026	Security content
Legend: Unsupported Latest version Preview version

See Apple's official release notes, and official security update contents.

== Reception ==
iOS 16 was generally praised as a major overhaul that refreshed the iPhone experience, primarily through its customizable lock screen and new app features, but it was criticized for its numerous bugs from the initial versions and battery drain reports.

== See also ==
- iPadOS 16
- macOS Ventura
- tvOS 16
- watchOS 9

== Notes ==
Preceded by iOS 15	iOS 16; 2022	Succeeded by iOS 17
