= IPod Touch (6th generation) =

Mobile device made by Apple Inc.

iPod Touch (6th generation)
- iPod touch (6th Generation) in Pink with white face
- Developer: Apple Inc.
- Manufacturer: Foxconn
- Product family: iPod
- Released: July 15, 2015; 11 years ago
- Discontinued: July 27, 2017; 9 years ago (16 and 64 GB); May 28, 2019; 7 years ago (32 and 128 GB)
- Operating system: Original: iOS 8.4; Last: iOS 12.5.8
- System on a chip: Apple A8; Apple M8 motion coprocessor
- CPU: 1.4 GHz 64-bit dual-core ARMv8-A "Typhoon" (Underclocked to 1.1 GHz)
- Memory: 1 GB LPDDR3 RAM
- Storage: 16, 32, 64, or 128 GB flash memory
- Display: 4 in (100 mm) diagonal widescreen Multi-Touch display with IPS technology 1136-by-640-pixel resolution at 326 ppi 800:1 contrast ratio (typical) 500 cd/m² max brightness (typical) Fingerprint-resistant oleophobic coating
- Graphics: PowerVR Series 6XT GX6450 (quad-core)
- Input: Multi-touch touchscreen Volume buttons Microphone; Built-in speaker Voice control 3-axis gyroscope 3-axis accelerometer M8 motion coprocessor
- Camera: Rear: 8 MP back-side illuminated sensor iSight camera Autofocus Aperture ƒ/2.4 Five-element lens Hybrid IR filter Backside illumination Improved face detection HD video recording With Cinematic Image Stabilization 1080p (30fps) 720p Slow-motion recording (120fps) Panorama; Front: FaceTime HD camera with 1.2 MP Aperture ƒ/2.2 720p HD video recording (30fps)
- Connectivity: Wi-Fi (802.11 a/b/g/n/ac) (802.11n: 2.4 and 5 GHz); Bluetooth 4.1
- Dimensions: 123.4 mm (4.86 in) H 58.6 mm (2.31 in) W 6.1 mm (0.24 in) D
- Weight: 88 g (3.1 oz)
- Predecessor: iPod Touch (5th generation)
- Successor: iPod Touch (7th generation)
- Related: iPhone 6 iPhone SE (1st generation)
- Website: Apple – iPod Touch at the Wayback Machine (archived July 15, 2015)

The sixth generation iPod Touch (marketed as the iPod touch) is a discontinued mobile device designed and marketed by Apple Inc. with a touchscreen-based user interface. It is the successor to the iPod Touch (5th generation), becoming the first major update to the iPod lineup in more than two and a half years. It was released on the online Apple Store on July 15, 2015, along with minor upgrades to the iPod Nano and iPod Shuffle. This generation of iPod Touch was officially discontinued by Apple on May 28, 2019, with the release of its next-generation successor. It supports up to iOS 12.5.8, released on January 26, 2026.

== Features ==
=== Software ===
The sixth-generation iPod Touch features iOS, Apple's mobile operating system.

The device originally shipped with iOS 8.4, which was released on June 30, 2015, along with the Apple Music streaming service. It can play music, movies, television shows, audiobooks, and podcasts and can sort its media library by songs, artists, albums, videos, playlists, genres, composers, podcasts, audiobooks, and compilations. Scrolling is achieved by swiping a finger across the screen. Alternatively, headset controls can be used to pause, play, skip, and repeat tracks. However, the EarPods that come with the sixth-generation iPod touch do not include a remote or microphone.

The sixth-generation iPod Touch supports iOS 8 through iOS 12. The latest version of iOS that this device can run is 12.5.8, which is a security update to iOS 12 only for devices that cannot run iOS 13.

=== Hardware ===
The sixth-generation iPod Touch features the Apple A8 and Apple M8 motion co-processor chipset with 64-bit architecture which is the same chip on iPad Mini 4, Apple TV 4th Gen, iPhone 6, and the HomePod, but it is slightly underclocked at 1.1 GHz (the iPhone 6 series was clocked at 1.4 GHz while the iPad Mini 4 was clocked at 1.5 GHz) because of its small battery. It has 1 GB of LPDDR3 RAM, twice the amount as the previous-generation iPod touch. Apple's Metal graphics technology is also compatible with this generation of iPod touch. With regard to battery life, this device is powered by a non-removable 1,043 mAh lithium-ion polymer battery. Based on tests conducted by Apple, the device can provide up to 40 hours of audio playback or 8 hours of video playback.

The iPod touch features an 8 MP rear iSight camera with video which can record in 1080p at 30 fps, or 120 fps in slow-motion mode that records at 720p. The camera also supports a burst mode and has an LED flash. Unlike the previous-generation version, the rear camera on the sixth-generation iPod Touch lacks a sapphire crystal lens. The front camera is unchanged from the previous generation, a 1.2 MP sensor and can record video up to 720p. It is the first iPod touch that is available with 128 GB of storage, partially filling the void left behind by the iPod Classic which offered 160 GB of storage at the time it was discontinued.

=== Design ===
The exterior design of the sixth-generation iPod touch is largely identical to that of its predecessor, with the exception of the iPod Touch Loop button, which was removed.

Back Color Name	Front	Camera Ring	Antenna	Capacities Available
Space Gray	Black	Black	Black	16 GB; 32 GB; 64 GB; 128 GB
Gold	White	Gold	Black	16 GB; 32 GB; 64 GB; 128 GB
Silver	White	Silver	Black	16 GB; 32 GB; 64 GB; 128 GB
Blue	White	Silver	Black	16 GB; 32 GB; 64 GB; 128 GB
Pink	White	Silver	Black	16 GB; 32 GB; 64 GB; 128 GB
(Product) RED	White	Silver	Black	16 GB; 32 GB; 64 GB; 128 GB

=== Accessories ===
The sixth-generation iPod touch comes with a Lightning Charging cable. This model also comes with the EarPods without Remote and Mic. This iPod touch is compatible with Apple's AirPods wireless headphones, which were announced at the September 7, 2016, Apple Special Event along with the iPhone 7, and released in late December 2016. It is also compatible with the EarPods with Lightning Connector which launched concurrently with the iPhone 7, and the remote functions are active.

== Reception ==
Nate Ralph from CNET praised the device's camera quality and noted the iPod Touch's exceptional performance, but criticized it for its middling battery life and small display, and stated that he considered it "largely redundant" due to smartphones and tablets. Sascha Segan from PCMag has also noted the poor battery life, but stated that the iPod Touch is still the best option for anyone who would prefer a handheld media player that does not require an intimate relationship with a cellular carrier.

== See also ==
- List of iPod models
- List of iOS devices

Preceded by iPod Touch (5th generation)	iPod Touch (6th generation); July 2015 – May 2019	Succeeded by iPod Touch (7th generation)
