= Animoji =

Animated emoticons by Apple Inc.

A monkey Animoji

Animoji are a collection of digital avatars created by Apple Inc., based upon symbols of animals and mythical creatures from their Apple Color Emoji typeface. Unlike standard emoji, Animoji are 3D models which can be custom-animated using facial motion capture to reflect the user's own facial expressions and utilize lip sync to seemingly speak audio messages recorded by the sender. The name is a portmanteau of "animated emoji", referring to this capability. Certain Animoji also use audio modulation features to alter the way the voice of the character sounds when recorded.

Animoji can be accessed from the iMessage app on compatible devices and can be embedded on top of users in FaceTime calls or on video recordings in Clips. A set of static expressions for each character, themselves based on other popular "smiley" emojis, are also available as a collection of iMessage stickers and are available on devices without Face ID support. Despite their similar appearance to standard emoji, Animoji have no correlation to the Unicode standard and are simply transmitted to other devices as image or video files.

== Memoji ==
A Memoji

With iOS 12, Apple expanded upon Animoji by implementing customizable Memoji, which can be designed by the user using different facial features and clothing options to create avatars of themselves or others. Subsequent updates have included further customization options, including the introduction of visual representations of disabilities through devices such as cochlear implants and oxygen tubes, which can be added to an avatar.

A standalone Memoji app was implemented on Apple Watch devices with watchOS 7, allowing users to create and adjust their avatars from their wrists. A watch face featuring both Animoji and Memoji characters was also introduced.

== Characters ==
The following characters are available as Animoji:

- Mouse (🐭)
- Octopus (🐙)
- Cow (🐮)
- Giraffe (🦒)
- Shark (🦈)
- Owl (🦉)
- Boar (🐗)
- Monkey (🐵)
- Robot (🤖)
- Cat (🐱)
- Dog (🐶)
- Alien (👽)
- Fox (🦊)
- Pile of Poo (💩)
- Pig (🐷)
- Panda (🐼)
- Rabbit (🐰)
- Chicken (🐔)
- Unicorn (🦄)
- Lion (🦁)
- Dragon (🐉)
- Skull (💀)
- Bear (🐻)
- Tiger (🐯)
- Koala (🐨)
- T-Rex (🦖)
- Ghost (👻)

== History ==
Apple had created 3D models of all standard emoji prior to its late-2016 OS updates from which the static default 2D graphics had been rendered. A select set of these models are being used again for creating still images and short animations dynamically.

Animoji were first unveiled alongside the announcement of the iPhone X, as the feature utilizes the device's TrueDepth camera to achieve facial tracking. A total of twelve characters were available upon release, with an additional twelve made available in later updates.
