= IPhone 6s =

Smartphones released by Apple in 2015

iPhone 6s iPhone 6s Plus

- iPhone 6s in Rose Gold
- Developer: Apple
- Type: Smartphone
- Series: iPhone
- First released: September 25, 2015; 11 years ago
- Discontinued: 16 and 64 GB: September 7, 2016; 10 years ago 32 and 128 GB: September 12, 2018; 8 years ago
- Units sold: 13 million in launch weekend
- Predecessor: iPhone 6 and 6 Plus
- Successor: iPhone 7 and 7 Plus
- Compatible networks: GSM, CDMA, 3G, EVDO, HSPA+, LTE/4G, LTE Advanced/4G+
- Form factor: Slate
- Colors: Space Grey; Silver; Rose Gold; Gold
- Dimensions: 6s: 138.3 × 67.1 × 7.1 mm (5.44 × 2.64 × 0.28 in); 6s Plus: 158.2 × 77.9 × 7.3 mm (6.23 × 3.07 × 0.29 in)
- Weight: 6s: 143 g (5.0 oz); 6s Plus: 192 g (6.8 oz)
- Operating system: Original: iOS 9.0; Current: iOS 15.8.8, released May 11, 2026
- System-on-chip: Apple A9
- Memory: 2 GB LPDDR4 RAM
- Storage: 16, 32, 64 or 128 GB TLC NAND connected via NVMe
- Battery: 6s: 3.82 V 6.55 W·h (1715 mA·h) Li-Po; 6s Plus: 3.8 V 10.45 W·h (2750 mA·h) Li-Po
- Rear camera: Sony Exmor RS IMX315 12 MP (1.22 μm), true-tone flash, autofocus, IR filter, burst mode, f/2.2, 4K video recording at 30 fps or 1080p at 30 or 60 fps, slow-motion video (1080p at 120 fps and 720p at 240 fps), timelapse with stabilization, panorama (up to 63 megapixels), face detection, digital image stabilization, optical image stabilization (6s Plus only)
- Front camera: 5 MP, burst mode, f/2.2, exposure control, face detection, auto-HDR, 720p HD video recording, Retina flash
- Display: 6s: 4.7 in (120 mm) Retina HD, LED-backlit IPS LCD, 1334 × 750 pixel resolution (326 ppi); 6s Plus: 5.5 in (140 mm) Retina HD, LED-backlit IPS LCD, 1920 × 1080 pixel resolution (401 ppi), 500 cd/m^{2} max brightness (typical)
- Sound: Mono speaker, 3.5 mm stereo audio jack
- Connectivity: All models: LTE (Bands 1 to 5, 7, 8, 12, 13, 17 to 20, 25 to 29), TD-LTE (Bands 38 to 41), TD-SCDMA 1900 (F), 2000 (A), UMTS/HSPA+/DC-HSDPA (850, 900, 1700/2100, 1900, 2100 MHz), CDMA EV-DO Rev. A (800, 1700/2100, 1900, 2100 MHz), GSM/EDGE (850, 900, 1800, 1900 MHz), Wi-Fi (802.11 a/b/g/n/ac), Bluetooth 4.2, NFC, GPS, GLONASS, Galileo & QZSS; Models A1633 and A1634: LTE (Band 30)
- Hearing aid compatibility: M3, T4
- Made in: China
- Other: FaceTime audio or video, Voice over LTE
- Website: iPhone 6s – Apple at the Wayback Machine (archived December 1, 2015)

The iPhone 6s and iPhone 6s Plus are smartphones that were designed, developed, and marketed by Apple. They are the ninth generation of the iPhone. They were announced on September 9, 2015, at the Bill Graham Civic Auditorium in San Francisco by Apple CEO Tim Cook, with pre-orders beginning September 12 and official release on September 25, 2015. They were succeeded by the iPhone 7 and iPhone 7 Plus on September 7, 2016, and were discontinued by Apple with the announcement of the iPhone XS, iPhone XS Max, and iPhone XR on September 12, 2018, but authorized resellers in certain countries, especially those located in Asia, continued selling them until 2019, mostly involving the 32 GB model.

The iPhone 6s has a similar design to the iPhone 6 but includes updated hardware, including a strengthened 7000 series aluminum alloy chassis and upgraded Apple A9 system-on-chip, a new 12-megapixel rear camera that can record up to 4K video at 30 fps (a first in the series), can take dynamic "Live Photos", the first increase in front camera photo resolution since the 2012 iPhone 5, and also features for the first time front facing "Retina Flash" which brightens up the display three times of its highest possible brightness for selfies, 2nd generation Touch ID fingerprint recognition sensor, LTE Advanced support, and "Hey Siri" capabilities without needing to be plugged in. The iPhone 6s also introduces a new hardware feature known as "3D Touch", which enables pressure-sensitive touch inputs. The iPhone 6s and iPhone 6s Plus are also the first smartphones to use the fastest high end flash storage NVM Express (NVMe).

The iPhone 6s (along with the iPhone XS and XR) were previously the longest supported iPhones, running seven major versions of iOS from iOS 9 to iOS 15. They were surpassed by the iPhone 11, 11 Pro and SE (2nd generation), which supported eight versions.

== History ==
Before the official unveiling, several aspects of the iPhone 6s were rumored, including the base model having 16 gigabytes of storage, the pressure-sensitive display technology known as 3D Touch, and a new rose gold color option.

iPhone 6s and iPhone 6s Plus were officially unveiled on September 9, 2015, during a press event at the Bill Graham Civic Auditorium in San Francisco. Pre-orders began September 12, with the official release on September 25.

On September 7, 2016, Apple announced the iPhone 7 and 7 Plus as respective successors to the iPhone 6s and 6s Plus, although they continued to be sold at a reduced price point as entry-level options in the iPhone lineup.

On March 31, 2017, the iPhone 6s and 6s Plus were released in Indonesia alongside the iPhone 7 and 7 Plus, following Apple's research and development investment in the country.

The iPhone 6s and 6s Plus as well as the first-generation iPhone SE are the last iPhones to feature a dual-core CPU, as the iPhone 7 and 7 Plus feature a quad-core CPU.

The iPhone 6s and iPhone 6s Plus as well as the first-generation iPhone SE are the last iPhones to feature a standard 3.5 mm stereo headphone jack, as the iPhone 7 and 7 Plus as well as subsequent models (until the iPhone 14 and 14 Plus) do not feature a headphone jack, requiring the use of the Lightning port for wired audio, and the USB-C port for the iPhone 15 and later.

The 16 GB and 64 GB models were discontinued on September 7, 2016. The 32 GB and 128 GB models were subsequently discontinued on September 12, 2018, with the release of the iPhone XR.

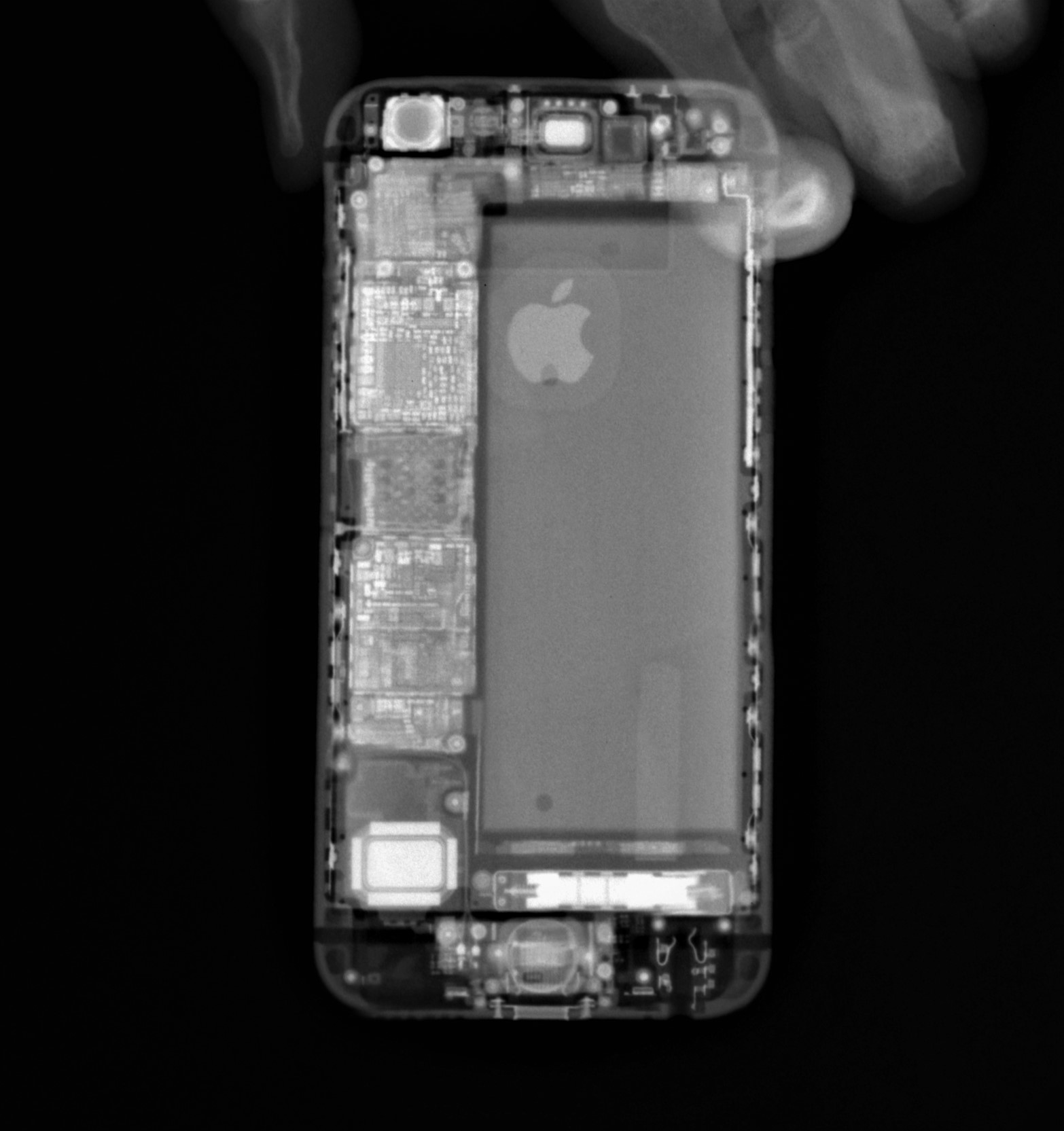
X-ray of the iPhone 6s

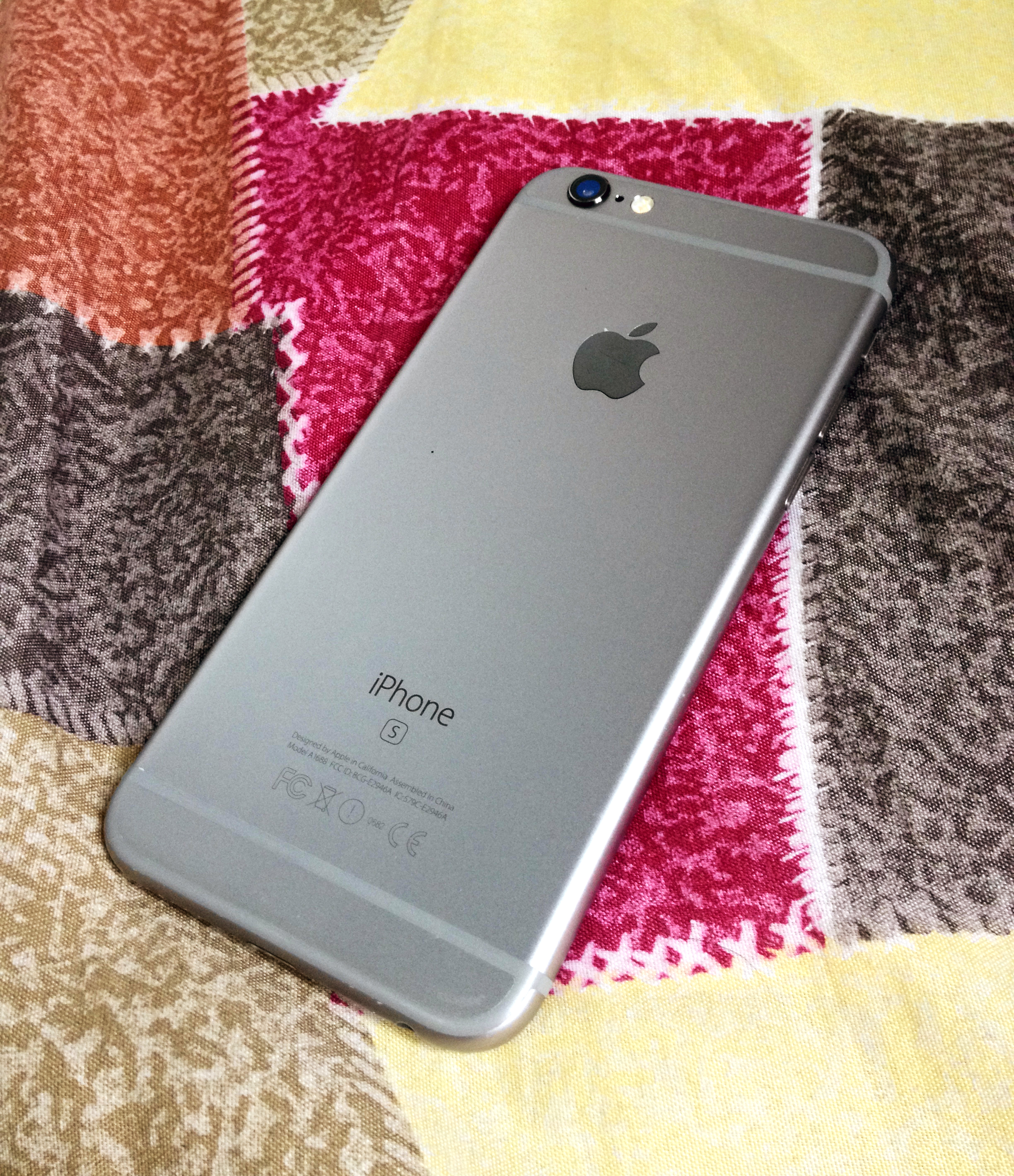
The Space Gray variant of an iPhone 6s showing its rear aluminum housing, identical to the iPhone 6. The "S" logo is the main visible difference from the iPhone 6.

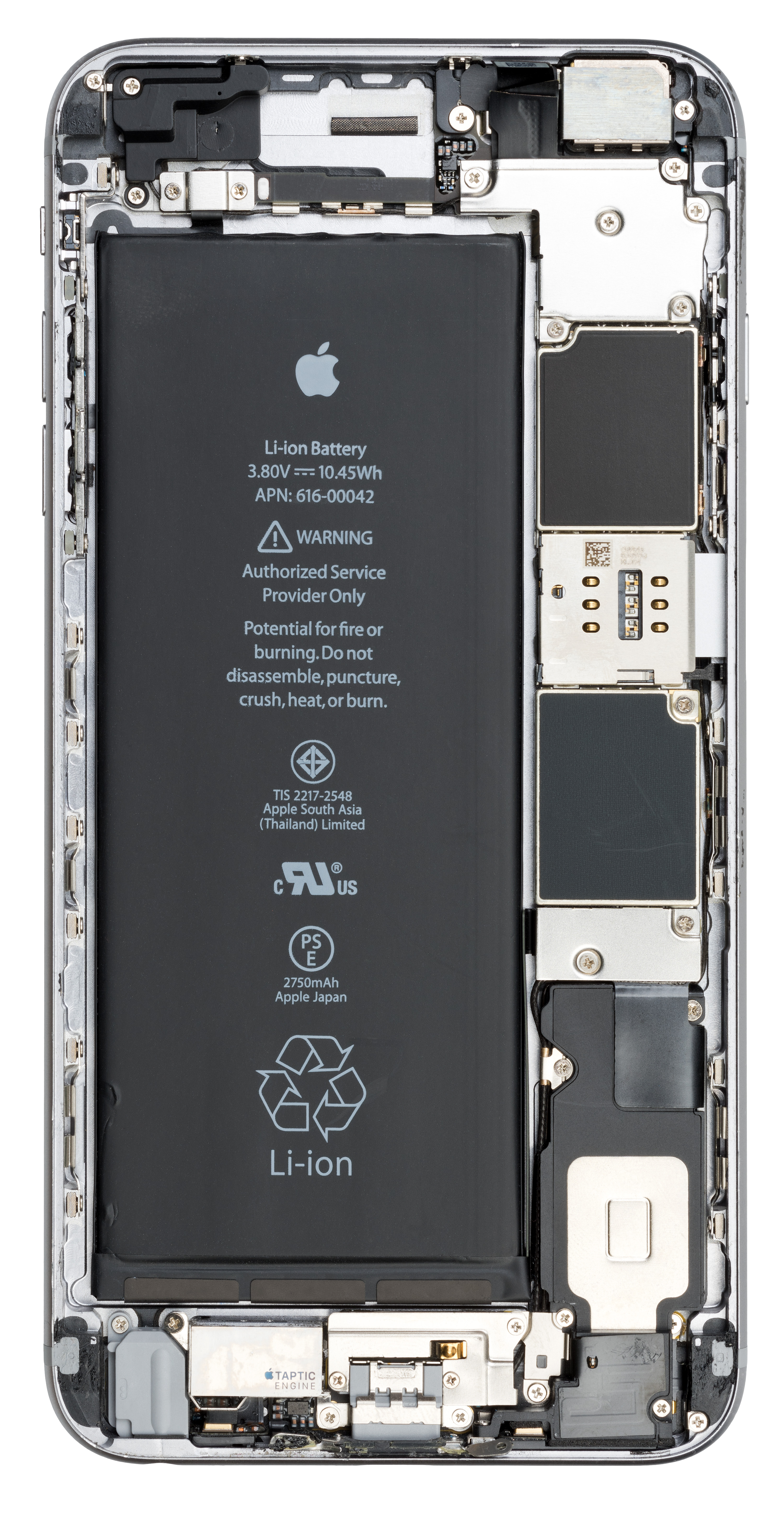
An iPhone 6s Plus with the glass screen removed

== Specifications ==
=== Hardware ===
==== Design ====
The iPhone 6s is nearly identical in design to the iPhone 6. In response to the "bendgate" design flaws of the previous model, changes were made to improve the durability of the chassis: the 6s was constructed from a stronger, 7000 series aluminum alloy, "key points" in the rear casing were strengthened and reinforced, and touchscreen integrated circuits were re-located to the display assembly. Alongside the existing gold, silver, and space gray options, a new rose gold color option was also introduced.

Color	Name	Front	Antenna
	Space Gray	Black	Light Grey
	Silver	White	Light Grey
	Gold	White	White
	Rose Gold	White	White

==== Chipsets ====
The iPhone 6s is powered by the Apple A9 system-on-chip, which the company stated is up to 70% faster than Apple A8, and has up to 90% better graphics performance. The iPhone 6s has 2 GiB of RAM, twice as much as any previous iPhone, and also supports LTE Advanced. The Touch ID sensor on the 6s was also updated, with the new version having improved fingerprint scanning performance over the previous version.

==== Batteries ====
While the capacities of their non-user-replaceable batteries are slightly smaller (1715 mAh and 2750 mAh respectively), Apple rates the iPhone 6s and 6s Plus as having the same average battery life as their respective predecessors (1810 mAh and 2915 mAh). The A9 system-on-chip was dual-sourced from TSMC and Samsung. Although it was speculated that the Samsung version had worse battery performance than the TSMC version, multiple independent tests have shown there is no appreciable difference between the two chips. Although the device was not promoted as such, the iPhone 6s has a degree of water resistance because of a change to its internal design, which places a silicone seal around components of the logic board and an adhesive gasket around the display assembly to prevent them from being shorted by accidental exposure to water.

==== Displays ====
Their displays are the same sizes as those of the iPhone 6, coming in 4.7-inch 750p and 5.5-inch 1080p (Plus) sizes. The iPhone 6s features a technology known as 3D Touch; sensors are embedded in the screen's backlight layer that measure the firmness of the user's touch input by the distance between it and the cover glass, allowing the device to distinguish between normal and more forceful presses. 3D Touch is combined with a Taptic Engine vibrator to provide associated haptic feedback. Although similar, this is distinct from the Force Touch technology used on the Apple Watch and the trackpad of the Retina MacBook, as it is more sensitive and can recognize more levels of touch pressure than Force Touch. Due to the hardware needed to implement 3D Touch, the iPhone 6s is heavier than its predecessor.

==== Cameras ====
The iPhone 6s and 6s Plus feature a 12-megapixel (4032×3024 pixels) rear-facing camera, an upgrade from the 8-megapixel (3264×2448) unit on previous models, as well as a 5-megapixel front-facing camera, compared to 1.3 megapixels of the iPhone 5, iPhone 5s, iPhone 6, 6 Plus and iPhone SE.

Their rear camera can record 4K video (3840×2160p) for the first time on an iPhone, as well as FullHD (1920×1080p) video at 30, 60 and now 120 frames per second, the latter also for the first time on an iPhone. The camera was well received by many critics of the phone. When the camera takes a 4K video recording, it can use the storage on the phone rapidly. The 16 gigabyte version of the phone was only capable of holding 40 minutes of 4K video (bit rate: 6 MB/s or 48 Mbit/s).

Still photos with 6.5 megapixels (3412×1920) can be captured during video recording.

==== Storage ====
The iPhone 6s and 6s Plus were originally offered in models with 16, 64, and 128 GB (14.9, 59.6 or 119.2 GiB) of internal storage. Following the release of iPhone 7 in September 2016, the 16 and 64 GB models were dropped and replaced by a new 32 GB (29.8 GiB) option. Some of this storage space is used by preinstalled software, resulting in usable storage of 11.5, 27.5, 56.5 and 114 GiB. For improved storage performance, iPhone 6s utilizes NVM Express (NVMe), resulting in a maximum average read speed of 1,840 megabytes per second.

==== Others ====
The iPhone 6s and 6s Plus are the first iPhones to feature Raise to Wake.

=== Software ===
The iPhone 6s originally shipped with iOS 9; the operating system leverages the 3D Touch hardware to allow recognition of new gestures and commands, including "peeking" at content with a light touch and "popping" it into view by pressing harder, and accessing context menus with links to commonly used functions within apps with harder presses on home screen icons. The camera app's "Retina Flash" feature allows the display's brightness to be used as a makeshift flash on images taken with the front camera, while "Live Photos" captures a short video alongside each photo taken.

The iPhone 6s, 6s Plus, and first-generation SE support iOS 12, which was first released on September 17, 2018. They also support iOS 13, unveiled on June 3, 2019, and was released to the public on September 19, 2019; as well as iOS 14, unveiled on June 22, 2020, and iOS 15, unveiled on June 7, 2021. These phones support most of the main features of iOS 13, including dark mode. Along with the iPhone SE, the 6s and 6s Plus are the oldest iPhones to support iOS 13, iOS 14 and iOS 15.

On June 6, 2022, after iOS 16 was announced at the WWDC 2022, it was revealed that the iPhone 6s and 6s Plus along with the first-generation iPhone SE, iPhone 7, and iPhone 7 Plus will not be compatible with this new version of the operating system.

== Reception ==
The iPhone 6s had a generally positive reception. While performance and camera quality were praised by most reviewers, the addition of 3D Touch was liked by one critic for the potential of entirely new interface interactions, but disliked by another critic for not providing users with an expected intuitive response before actually using the feature. The battery life was criticized, and one reviewer asserted that the phone's camera was not significantly better than the rest of the industry. The iPhone 6s set a new first-weekend sales record, selling 13 million models, up from 10 million for the iPhone 6 in the previous year. However, Apple saw its first-ever quarterly year-over-year decline in iPhone sales in the months after the launch, credited to a saturated smartphone market in Apple's biggest countries and a lack of iPhone purchases in developing countries.

Nilay Patel of The Verge in 2015 described the 6s, in particular the Plus model, as "right now the best phone on the market. ... There just aren't other companies that can roll out a feature like 3D Touch and make it work in a way that suggests the creation of entirely new interface paradigms, and every other phone maker needs to figure out exactly why Apple's cameras are so consistent before they can really compete." Samuel Gibbs of The Guardian commented that the phone "has the potential to be the best smaller smartphone on the market, but its short battery life is deeply frustrating" and described the camera as "not leagues ahead of the competition anymore". Tom Salinger of The Register praised performance, noting that "we're now using phones with the performance of current PCs", but described 3D Touch as "just a glorified vibrator" and "no good ... you still don't know quite what's going to happen until you try it". Ryan Smith and Joshua Ho of AnandTech awarded the iPhone 6s and 6s Plus its Editors' Choice Gold Award, based largely on the phone's performance and the addition of 3D Touch.

=== Sales ===
On the Monday following the iPhone 6s's launch weekend, Apple announced that they had sold 13 million models, a record-breaking number that exceeded the 10 million launch sales of the iPhone 6 in 2014. In the months following the launch, Apple saw its first-ever quarterly year-over-year decline in iPhone sales, attributed to a saturated smartphone market in Apple's biggest sales countries and consumers in developing countries not buying iPhones.

As of 2019, the iPhone 6s has sold over 174.1 million units worldwide.

==== Release dates by region ====
September 25, 2015

- Australia
- Canada
- China
- France
- Germany
- Hong Kong
- Japan
- New Zealand
- Puerto Rico
- Singapore
- United Kingdom
- United States

October 9, 2015

- Andorra
- Austria
- Belgium
- Bosnia and Herzegovina
- Bulgaria
- Croatia
- Czechia
- Denmark
- Estonia
- Finland
- Greece
- Greenland
- Hungary
- Iceland
- Ireland
- Isle of Man
- Italy
- Latvia
- Liechtenstein
- Lithuania
- Luxembourg
- Maldives
- Mexico
- Monaco
- Netherlands
- Norway
- Poland
- Portugal
- Romania
- Russia
- Slovakia
- Slovenia
- Spain
- Sweden
- Switzerland
- Taiwan

October 10, 2015

- Bahrain
- Jordan
- Kuwait
- Qatar
- Saudi Arabia
- United Arab Emirates

October 16, 2015

- India
- Israel
- Kazakhstan
- Macedonia
- Malaysia
- Malta
- Montenegro
- South Africa
- Turkey

October 23, 2015

- Belarus
- Colombia
- Guam
- Moldova
- Serbia
- South Korea
- Ukraine

October 30, 2015

- Chile
- Guatemala
- Thailand

November 6, 2015

- Mauritius
- Philippines

November 13, 2015

- Brazil
- Costa Rica

March 31, 2017

- Indonesia

== Hardware issues ==
=== Unexpected battery shutdowns ===
In November 2016, Apple announced that a "very small number" of iPhone 6s devices manufactured between September and October 2015 have faulty batteries that unexpectedly shut down. While Apple noted that the battery problems were "not a safety issue", it announced a battery replacement program for affected devices. Customers with affected devices, which span "a limited serial number range", were able to check their device's serial number on Apple's website, and, if affected, receive a battery replacement for no cost at Apple Stores or authorized Apple Service Providers.

In December 2016, Apple revealed new details about the issue, stating that the affected devices contained a "battery component that was exposed to controlled ambient air longer than it should have been before being assembled into battery packs".

== See also ==
- History of iPhone
- List of iPhone models
- Timeline of iPhone models

Preceded by iPhone 6 / 6 Plus	iPhone; 9th generation	Succeeded by iPhone 7 / 7 Plus
