= IOS 15 =

2021 mobile operating system

iOS 15
- Version of the iOS operating system

- iOS 15 home screen on an iPhone 13 mini
- Developer: Apple
- Working state: No longer supported
- Source model: Closed with open-source components
- General availability: September 20, 2021; 5 years ago
- Latest release: 15.7.2 (iPhone 8 and later) (December 13, 2022; 3 years ago) [±] 15.8.8 (iPhone 6s, iPhone 6s Plus, iPhone SE (1st generation), iPhone 7, iPhone 7 Plus, and iPod Touch (7th generation) only) (May 11, 2026; 6 months ago) [±]
- Update method: Software Update
- Package manager: App Store
- Supported platforms: iPhone, iPod Touch
- Kernel type: Hybrid (XNU)
- Default user interface: Cocoa Touch (multi-touch, GUI)
- License: Proprietary software with open-source components
- Preceded by: iOS 14
- Succeeded by: iOS 16
- Official website: iOS 15 at the Wayback Machine (archived September 6, 2022)
- Tagline: In touch. In the moment.

Support status
- Obsolete, unsupported

Articles in the series
- iPadOS 15 (derived from iOS 15)

iOS 15 is the fifteenth major release of the iOS mobile operating system developed by Apple for its iPhone and iPod Touch lines of products. It was announced at the company's Worldwide Developers Conference on June 7, 2021, as the successor to iOS 14 and released to the public on September 20, 2021.

On June 6, 2022, at WWDC 2022, its successor, iOS 16, was announced. iOS 15 was officially succeeded by iOS 16 on September 12, 2022.

iOS 15 is the final version of iOS that supports the iPhone 6s & 6s Plus, first-generation iPhone SE, iPhone 7 & 7 Plus, and seventh-generation iPod Touch, as its successor, iOS 16, drops support for those models. This means that iOS 15 is the last version to support the iPod Touch. iOS 15 is also the final iOS version to support live wallpapers. The current version available for these models is iOS 15.8.8, which released on May 11, 2026.

== System features ==
=== Focus ===
Replacing the dedicated Do Not Disturb feature introduced in iOS 6, Focus is a new feature that allows a user to change their "state", such as Work, Sleep, Do Not Disturb or a custom focus. Based on the selected state, users can set the type of notification they want to receive and from which application. It is also possible to choose which pages and then apps to show on the Home based on the state. The state can change automatically based on where the user is or the time of day.

Focus also controls the interactions with Contacts, so it is possible to decide which specific contacts can "disturb" the user.

Some Lock Screen settings can be controlled based on the state: for example, the Dim Lock Screen feature, which darkens the lock screen from not showing notifications on that screen, can be automatically turned on or off based on the state.

Focus is synchronized automatically across different iOS, iPadOS, and macOS devices on the same iCloud account, as well as any paired watchOS devices.

=== Notifications ===
Notifications receive a new look with contact photos for all communication apps and larger app icons. When the notification arrives, the user can mute the corresponding app for one hour or all day.

The Summary allows the user to group and postpone the notifications coming from the chosen apps, delivering them at a scheduled time in a single big notification called summary notification.

=== Live Text ===
Devices with an A12 chip or later support Live Text, which uses optical character recognition to recognize text in images, allowing copy-and-paste, look-up, and translation in Photos, Screenshot, Quick Look, Safari, and Live Preview with Camera. This feature uses artificial intelligence text recognition using the Neural Engine.

=== Smart stacks with suggested widgets ===
The Widgets in iOS 15 are now more dynamic: depending on the context, the system can add or remove widgets to existing stacks. For example, near the start of a certain event in the Calendar, the system can decide to add the Calendar Widget to an existing smart stack, if it is not already present, and then remove it at the end of the event.

=== Cross-app drag and drop ===
Pictures and text can be dragged from one app and dropped in another. This feature was previously only available in iPadOS.

=== Home screen ===
The various home screens can be reordered, deleted, hidden, or limited using Focus mode.

=== Per-app text size ===
From the Control Center, the text size can be set per app.

=== Spotlight ===
The global search function has been enhanced and it is also available on the lock screen by pulling the page down.

=== Dictation ===
Formerly limited to 60 seconds, the Voice-To-Text dictation time available in the keyboard is unlimited.

=== System-wide translation ===
System-wide translation allows the user to translate text in all apps by selecting it and tapping on the Translate option.

=== Adjust video playback speed ===
The system default player, used for videos and by many apps, supports changing playback speed.

=== Video Effects and Mic Mode ===
The Control Center supports Video Effects, adding Portrait effect to the camera, and Mic Mode to implement microphone Voice Isolation.

=== Accessibility improvements ===
- Per-App Accessibility: each app can have a different accessibility setting to customize the text (Bold Text, Larger Text, Button Shapes, On/Off Labels, Reduce Transparency), increase contrast, reduce motion, autoplay video-preview, etc.
- Image Exploration with VoiceOver: it describes photos to give users with low vision more context about what's displayed on the photo.
- Audible charts: the Audio Graphs accessibility framework allows to represent chart data with audio for blind and low-vision people.

=== iCloud ===
Backups to iCloud can now also be made on 5G cellular networks.

=== RealityKit 2 ===
This version for augmented reality (AR) uses new APIs to capture objects faster, and supports custom shaders, dynamic assets, custom systems and character control.

=== Accounts for school and work ===
User accounts managed by an organization, such as work or school accounts, can be added without requiring external apps or profiles.

=== StoreKit 2 ===
StoreKit 2 allows apps to implement the "Request a Refund" option in-app. The users can tap this option, select a specific in-app purchase and identify the problem that led to the refund request. It also allows developers to monitor the purchases made by their users without using third-party solutions.

== App features ==
=== FaceTime ===
iOS 15 adds several new features to FaceTime, including:

- Grid view for group conversations
- Portrait mode (requires A12 Bionic chip or later)
- Spatial Audio
- Voice isolation mode: remove background noise during calls
- Wide spectrum mode
- FaceTime links and web integration: Allow Android and Windows users to join calls
- Calendar integration
- Mute alerts, which let users know when they are talking while muted
- FaceTime can now take advantage of all rear cameras (on compatible devices)
- SharePlay allows the user to share their content from compatible video and music apps to a FaceTime call. The user can also share their screen to a FaceTime call.

=== Memoji ===
Memoji in iOS 15 have more customization options, including new clothing, two different eye colors, new glasses, new stickers, multicolored headwear, and new accessibility options.

=== Messages ===
- Multiple images in stack: Messages now displays multiple images in a stack, making them easier to navigate.
- Pinned content: the user can pin any content, text or link they receive from a contact.
- Shared with You: Messages also introduces a new feature called "Shared with You", which organizes links and other content shared via Messages in a dedicated section in their native apps for later viewing (for instance, a news article shared via messages is shown in the News app).

=== Maps ===
Apple Maps receives several new features:

- Greater depth has been added to the driving maps with the use of 3D modeling, which will make it easier to interpret directions when faced with roads that go over or under the one being driven on, including buildings, bridges and trees.
- 3D globe with a new color palette and increased mountain, desert, and forest detail
- Increased traffic information, turn lanes, bike, bus and taxi lanes, medians, crosswalks
- Walking directions in augmented reality (on A12 devices or later)
- Redesigned place cards
- Improved filtering for search
- The night mode set in Maps now follows the night mode set in the OS (instead of activating it only at night) and the colors are improved.
- Public Transport Info: public transport routes and times with ability to pin favorite routes to the top. In-app notifications will alert users when they need to get off a bus or train. Transit information can be visible on a connected Apple Watch.
- Reports and Reviews: the user can report incidents, write reviews and add photos to points of interest, etc.
- New features for driving, including a new map where details such as traffic and incidents are highlighted, as well as an itinerary planner that lets the user view a future journey by selecting departure or arrival time.

=== Photos ===
The Photos app can now manually set the time, date, and location of a photo. The app also allows the user to view information about the photo such as the camera used to take the photo and the photo's file size. In the Photos app, the user can now look up places that are inside images; however, this feature only works on the Apple A12 chip or later.

=== Camera ===
Improved panoramic shooting mode on iPhone 12 and above: less geometric distortion in panoramic shots with elongated fields of view, noise and banding reduction that are formed in the image due to changes in brightness and contrast when moving the camera from side to side, a less blurry and clearer image even when capturing moving subjects within the panorama.

=== Safari ===
Safari was completely redesigned, moving the tab bar and address bar to the bottom of the screen, but there is an option to keep the legacy layout. It now has tab groups, allowing users to organize tabs and share entire groups of tabs. The user can now use a pull to refresh gesture to refresh a webpage. Browser extensions are available for the first time in Safari for iOS; they are the same extensions available in Safari for the Mac. Safari will automatically upgrade HTTP URLs to HTTPS if compatible. The WebM video container is supported.

Safari opens with a new start page; it is possible to have a custom page on startup that contains sections including favorites, most frequently visited sites, Siri suggestions, etc.

App Clips more discoverable: it is possible to show a full-screen preview of the app clip in Safari.

=== Weather ===
Weather received an overhaul, with new animations and weather maps in full screen, and the weather icon was updated. The app also has a next-time precipitation notifications feature which allows the user to get a notification whenever rain or snow is going to start or stop within the next hour for the user's current location and each saved location, independently.

=== Siri ===
Siri can now work offline on iPhones with an A12 Bionic chip or later, responding faster to common requests supported locally without need for Internet connection.

=== News ===
Apple News has been completely redesigned, featuring more rounded corners.

=== Share with Siri ===
Siri responds to requests such as "Hey Siri, share this with [name]" or "send this to [name]" to share screen content using Messages. Items such as images, web pages, Apple Music or Podcasts, Apple News stories, and Maps locations will share the actual content (or a link to it). For content Siri cannot share, Siri will send a screenshot, notifying the user.

Announce Notifications: with announce notifications update in iOS 15, Siri can read all incoming notifications aloud and allow users to speak a response to them. This can be enabled for specific apps.

=== Health ===
Health data can now be shared.

A new monitored parameter called "Walking Steadiness" has been added, which determines the risk of falling using gyroscopic sensors that measure balance, stability, and coordination.

Added the Trend analysis i.e. horizontal lines that show the trend of the various parameters over the long term.

Lab Results allows the user to import laboratory results into the Health app from a healthcare provider.

=== Files ===
Groups is a new view mode that groups files of the same type.

The built-in PDF editor can insert pages from existing files or scans, remove pages, and rotate pages. PDFs can also be locked with a password.

=== Notes ===
New #tags allow classifying, organizing, then finding the user's notes faster. Smart Folders automatically group various notes based on tags. Ability to share notes with other collaborators and work on them together. The activity view shows a summary of the changes made by other collaborators before the user's last reading and a day-by-day list of the activities carried out by each collaborator. It is possible to mention @someone in the notes, who will be notified.

=== Reminders ===
Ability to insert #tags in reminders to classify them.

=== Shortcuts ===
- Sound recognition has been added to the automations, so it is possible to execute a customized command when a certain sound is recognized.
- New automation triggers based on the current reading of a HomeKit-enabled humidity, air quality, or light level sensor.

=== Voice Memos ===
Added new playback options to adjust speed and skip silence.

=== Wallet ===
- Keys: iPhone is able to unlock select HomeKit-enabled smart locks. Requires an iPhone with an A12 chip or newer.
- Identification cards and driver licenses: iPhone can store a copy of a U.S. user's state-issued identity card or driver license. Arizona, Georgia, Connecticut, Iowa, Kentucky, Maryland, Oklahoma, and Utah will be the first states to support the feature. Arizona was the first state to support the feature with iOS 15.4 on March 23, 2022.

== Security and privacy ==
=== App Privacy Report ===
By activating this app logging, the user can save a 7-day summary of the times when the various apps access certain data and the domains or websites they visit. This feature was called "Record App Activity" until iOS 15.2, when its functionality was extended.

=== Siri Improved Privacy ===
On devices with an Apple A12 chip or later, Siri now converts audio into words on the device itself instead of sending it to Apple servers.

=== Hide IP address for trackers in Safari ===
Safari's anti-tracking now prevents known trackers from reading the user real IP address.

=== Hide IP address for external content in Mail ===
In the Mail app, the user can enable the setting to hide their IP address when downloading external content that may be present in a mail message. In this way it is possible to privately download this external content without being tracked by spammers or commercial companies that have inserted them without the user's knowledge.

=== Hide My Email ===
Hide My Email creates random email addresses that forward to the inbox so e-mail can be sent and received anonymously.

=== iCloud Private Relay ===
Private Relay masks the user's IP address in Safari, preserving the region without revealing the actual location. It also protects the DNS query resolution and insecure HTTP traffic in all apps.

=== Built-in one-time password authenticator With Autofill ===
The built-in authenticator allows iOS devices to be used to generate verification codes for additional sign-in security of accounts. There is no need to download a separate app because it is integrated into the OS. The verification codes are automatically filled when a user signs in to the site.

=== WPA3 Hotspot ===
Hotspot connections now can also use the WPA3 security protocol.

Tethering to/from older iOS devices is not possible as WPA2 compatibility is not fully supported.

=== CSAM detection ===
CSAM detection identifying known Child Sexual Abuse Material (CSAM) in photos stored iCloud Photos was originally intended to be included. Implementation of CSAM detection was delayed indefinitely, and cancelled altogether in December 2022. This recognition is based on a perceptual hash called NeuralHash.

Siri and Search were updated to intervene when users perform searches for queries related to CSAM. The Messages app will warn children when receiving or sending sexually explicit photos, blurring sent and received photos. It was originally planned to also notify parents of children under 13 if they choose to view flagged messages anyway, but this was removed due to concerns about abusive parents.

=== Hardened memory allocation ===
iOS 15 introduced kalloc_type in order to advance memory safety in the XNU kernel. This is primarily to mitigate privilege escalation vulnerabilities.

== Other changes ==
iOS	Notes
15.0	New widgets have been added: Mail, Contacts, Game Center, Find My, App Store, Sleep, Apple Card; iOS 13 wallpapers were removed in the first beta of iOS 15.; iOS 15 features a new wallpaper in two modes: light and dark.; "Other" storage was renamed to "System Data".; Passkey technology added.
15.1	SharePlay was officially released in iOS 15.1. It was initially present in the iOS 15.0 betas but was disabled and hidden behind a developer profile before the final release.
15.2	Emergency SOS improved.; On iOS 15.0–15.1, Face ID was disabled on the iPhone 13 series after a third-party screen replacement. This is no longer the case starting from iOS 15.2.
15.4	Additions: New Emojis.; Game Controllers Support for App Store.; SharePlay support.; Support for Italian and Chinese (Traditional) for Safari webpage translation.; New gender-neutral voice option for Siri.; 'Cosmetic Scan' Trade-In Tool for iPhone.; "Corner Gestures" for Notes in Settings.; The option to turn off notifications for Personal Automations in Shortcuts.; Face Mask and Glasses for FaceID.; Vaccination Records in the Health app.; Keychain Notes to iCloud.; Custom Email Domains for iCloud Support was expanded and added.; Changes: Emergency SOS settings were changed to "Call with Hold for all users" and "Call with 5 Presses".; TV App Customization will choose "Preferences" and choose "Still Frame" or "Poster Art" options for the "Up Next" display that was added in iOS 15.4.; Removals: A broken toggle to disable iCloud data access on the web was removed from Settings.; Fixes: FaceID was fixed and re-enabled.; Issue with 120 Hz animations not fully working on iPhone 13 Pro and Pro Max was fixed.
15.5	Weather: A "Report an Issue" feature was added to indicate to Apple that Weather was not describing local weather correctly, and the Weather app design was tweaked and improved.; SharePlay UI button was updated and more easily enabled.; Apple Pay in the Messages app was renamed to "Apple Cash".; Podcasts received a new setting to limit episodes stored on user's iPhone and iPad and automatically delete older ones.; Support for "External Link Account Entitlement" was added.; iTunes Pass was revamped, rebranded and renamed to "Apple Account Card".; Apple Account Balance card received a new image.; Apple Store includes a new feature "Pay with your iPhone in the Apple Store, shop online, or buy apps, subscriptions, and other services"; support for this feature was added.; Emergency SOS "Call with 5 Presses" setting was removed and disabled from Settings.

== Supported devices ==
All iPhones and iPod Touches that support iOS 13 and iOS 14 support iOS 15. However, devices with an A9, (Note: iPhone 6s, 6s Plus, and the first-generation SE) A10 Fusion, (Note: iPhone 7, 7 Plus, iPod Touch (7th generation)) or A11 Bionic (Note: iPhone 8, 8 Plus and X) SoC have limited support, (Note: Live text, animated backgrounds in the Weather app, certain Maps features such as the 3D globe, immersive walking directions with step-by-step directions shown in augmented reality and detailed maps in cities, using Siri offline, and certain FaceTime features, such as portrait mode, spatial audio, and voice isolation are not available on devices older than the iPhone XS/XS Max and XR.) while iPhones with an A12 Bionic SoC and later are fully supported. The iPhone SE (1st generation) and iPod Touch (7th generation) are the only supported devices to feature the 4-inch diagonal display.

Devices that support iOS 15 are as follows.

=== iPhone ===
- iPhone 6s & 6s Plus
- iPhone SE (1st generation)
- iPhone 7 & 7 Plus
- iPhone 8 & 8 Plus
- iPhone X
- iPhone XS & XS Max
- iPhone XR
- iPhone 11
- iPhone 11 Pro & 11 Pro Max
- iPhone SE (2nd generation)
- iPhone 12 & 12 Mini
- iPhone 12 Pro & 12 Pro Max
- iPhone 13 & 13 Mini
- iPhone 13 Pro & 13 Pro Max
- iPhone SE (3rd generation)

=== iPod Touch ===
- iPod Touch (7th generation)

== Version history ==
The first developer beta of iOS 15 was released on June 7, 2021, and the first public beta was released on June 30, 2021, six days after the release of the second developer beta. iOS 15 was officially released on September 20, 2021.

iOS 15 releases
Version	Build	Codename	Release date	Notes
15.0	19A341	Sky	September 24, 2021	Initial release on the iPhone 13 lineup.
15.0	19A346	Sky	September 20, 2021	Security content
15.0.1	19A348	Sky	October 1, 2021	Security content
15.0.2	19A404	Sky	October 11, 2021	Security content
15.1	19B74	SkyB	October 25, 2021	Security content
15.1.1	19B81	SkyB	November 17, 2021	Improves call drop performance on iPhone 12 and iPhone 13 models.
15.2	19C56	SkyC	December 13, 2021	Security content
15.2	19C57	SkyC	December 13, 2021	iPhone 13 series only
15.2.1	19C63	SkyD	January 12, 2022	Security content
15.3	19D50	SkyD	January 26, 2022	Security content
15.3.1	19D52	SkyD	February 10, 2022	Security content
15.4	19E241	SkyEcho	March 14, 2022	Initial release for iPhone SE (3rd generation). Security content
15.4.1	19E258	SkyEcho	March 31, 2022	Security content
15.5	19F77	SkyF	May 16, 2022	Security content
15.6	19G71	SkyG	July 20, 2022	Security content
15.6.1	19G82	SkyG	August 17, 2022	Security content
15.7	19H12	SkySecuritySydney	September 12, 2022	Security content
15.7.1	19H117	SkySecuritySydneyB	October 27, 2022	Security content
15.7.2	19H218	SkySecuritySydneyC	December 13, 2022	Released OTA as RC through beta profile for devices supported by iOS 16; public release limited to devices not supported by iOS 16.Security content
15.7.3	19H307	SkyUpdate	January 23, 2023	Only for devices not supported by iOS 16.
15.7.4	19H321	SkyUpdate	March 27, 2023	Only for devices not supported by iOS 16.
15.7.5	19H332	SkyUpdate	April 10, 2023	Only for devices not supported by iOS 16.
15.7.6	19H349	SkyUpdate	May 18, 2023	Only for devices not supported by iOS 16.
15.7.7	19H357	SkyUpdate	June 21, 2023	Only for devices not supported by iOS 16.
15.7.8	19H364	SkyUpdate	July 24, 2023	Only for devices not supported by iOS 16.
15.7.9	19H365	SkyUpdate	September 11, 2023	Only for devices not supported by iOS 16.
15.8	19H370	SkyUpdate	October 25, 2023	Only for devices not supported by iOS 16.
15.8.1	19H380	SkyUpdate	January 22, 2024	Only for devices not supported by iOS 16.
15.8.2	19H384	SkyUpdate	March 5, 2024	Only for devices not supported by iOS 16.
15.8.3	19H386	SkyUpdate	July 29, 2024	Only for devices not supported by iOS 16.
15.8.4	19H390	SkyUpdate	March 31, 2025	Only for devices not supported by iOS 16.
15.8.5	19H394	SkyUpdate	September 15, 2025	Only for devices not supported by iOS 16.
15.8.6	19H402	SkyUpdate	January 26, 2026	Only for devices not supported by iOS 16.
15.8.7	19H411	SkyUpdate	March 11, 2026	Only for devices not supported by iOS 16.
15.8.8	19H422	SkyUpdate	May 11, 2026	Only for devices not supported by iOS 16.

See Apple's official release notes, and official security update contents.

== Reception ==
iOS 15 was generally received as a steady and iterative update rather than a revolutionary one. While it didn't fundamentally change the iPhone interface, it was praised for its stability and quality of life improvements that refined the foundations laid by iOS 14.

== See also ==
- iPadOS 15
- macOS Monterey
- tvOS 15
- watchOS 8

Preceded by iOS 14	iOS 15; 2021	Succeeded by iOS 16
