= IPod Touch (7th generation) =

Mobile device made by Apple Inc.

iPod Touch

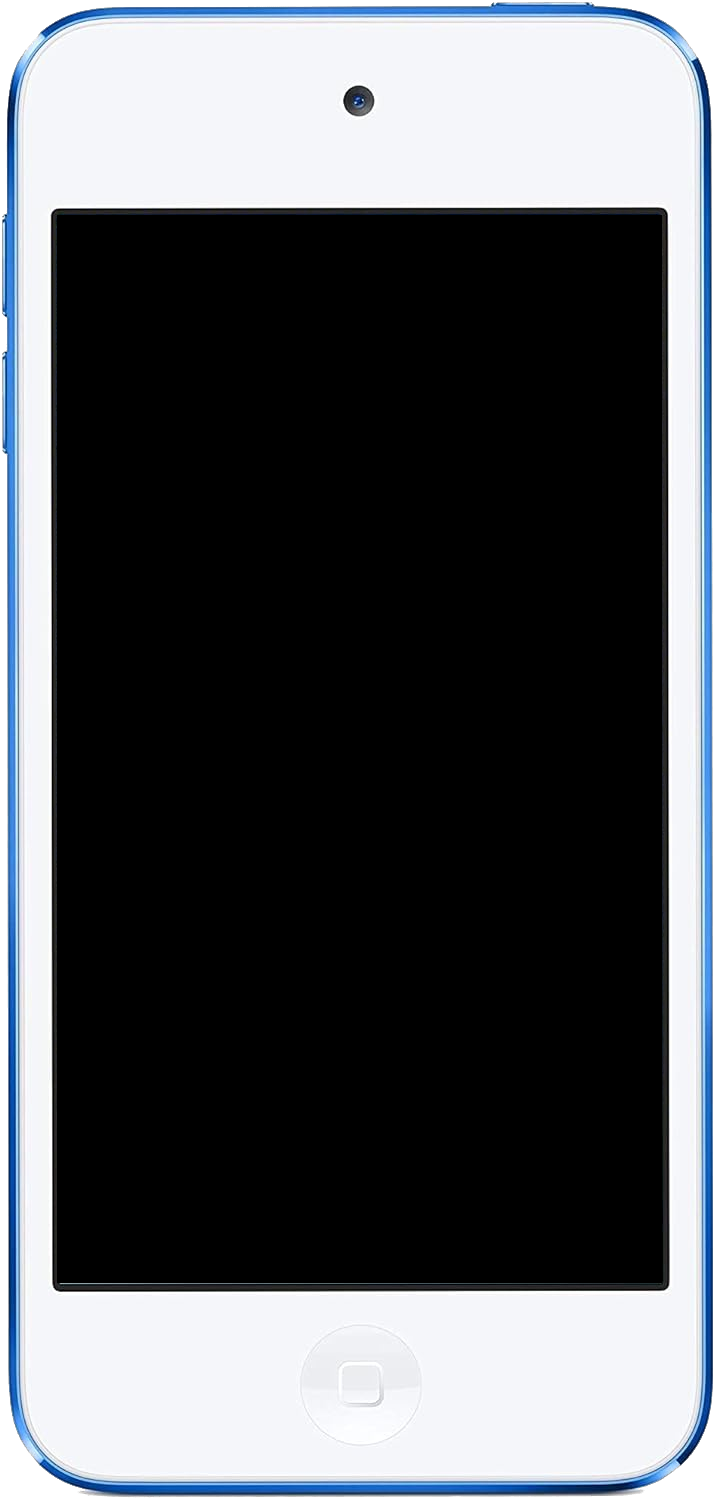
- iPod Touch (7th Generation) in Blue
- Developer: Apple, Inc.
- Manufacturer: Foxconn
- Product family: iPod
- Type: Multi-purpose mobile device
- Released: May 28, 2019; 7 years ago
- Discontinued: May 10, 2022; 4 years ago
- Operating system: Original: iOS 12.3; Current: iOS 15.8.8, released May 11, 2026
- System on a chip: Apple A10 Fusion; Apple M10 motion coprocessor
- CPU: 1.64 GHz 64-bit quad-core
- Memory: 2 GB LPDDR4 RAM
- Storage: 32, 128, or 256 GB flash memory
- Display: 4 in (100 mm) diagonal widescreen Multi-Touch display with IPS technology 1136-by-640-pixel resolution at 326 ppi 800:1 contrast ratio (typical) 500 cd/m^{2} max brightness (typical) Fingerprint-resistant oleophobic coating
- Graphics: Custom Imagination PowerVR (Series 7XT) GT7600 plus (hexa-core)
- Input: Multi-touch touchscreen Volume buttons Microphone; Built-in speaker Voice control 3-axis gyroscope 3-axis accelerometer M10 motion coprocessor
- Camera: Rear: 8 MP back-side illuminated sensor iSight camera Autofocus Aperture ƒ/2.4 Five-element lens Hybrid IR filter Backside illumination Improved face detection HD video recording With Cinematic Image Stabilization 1080p (30fps) 720p Slow-motion recording (120 fps) Panorama; Front: FaceTime HD camera with 1.2 MP Aperture ƒ/2.2 720p HD video recording (30 fps)
- Connectivity: Wi-Fi (802.11 a/b/g/n/ac) (802.11n: 2.4 and 5 GHz); Bluetooth 4.1
- Power: Li-ion battery, 8 hours of video playback time and 40 hours of music listening
- Dimensions: 123.4 mm (4.86 in) H 58.6 mm (2.31 in) W 6.1 mm (0.24 in) D
- Weight: 88 g (3.1 oz)
- Predecessor: iPod Touch (6th generation)
- Related: iPhone 7
- Website: web.archive.org/web/20210722031437/https://www.apple.com/ipod-touch// at the Wayback Machine (archived July 22, 2021)

The seventh generation iPod Touch (marketed as the iPod touch and colloquially known as the iPod touch (2019) or iPod touch 7) is a discontinued mobile device designed and marketed by Apple Inc. with a touchscreen-based user interface. It is the successor to the 6th-generation iPod Touch, the first major update to the line since 2015. It was released on May 28, 2019, and discontinued on May 10, 2022. It was the final product in Apple's iPod product line.

== Features ==
=== Software ===
The seventh-generation iPod touch features iOS, Apple's mobile operating system.

The seventh-generation iPod touch was introduced on May 28, 2019 running iOS 12.3. It can play music, movies, television shows, audiobooks, and podcasts and can sort its media library by songs, artists, albums, videos, playlists, genres, composers, podcasts, audiobooks, and compilations. Scrolling is achieved by swiping a finger across the screen. Alternatively, headset controls can be used to pause, play, skip, and repeat tracks. However, the EarPods that came with the seventh-generation iPod touch do not include a remote or microphone.

The seventh-generation iPod touch supports iOS 12.3 through iOS 15.8.8, which was last updated May 11, 2026.

The Apple A10 system-on-chip in the seventh-generation iPod touch enabled more advanced features than its predecessors. They include ARKit applications, and the Group FaceTime functionality.

=== Hardware ===
The seventh-generation iPod touch features the Apple A10 processor and M10 motion coprocessor, which is the same processor used in the iPhone 7 and the sixth generation iPad. However, it is underclocked to 1.64 GHz from 2.34 GHz, making the iPod Touch weaker than other devices with the same chip. The seventh-generation iPod touch features the same front and rear camera systems as the sixth-generation device. That includes an 8 MP rear-facing camera, capable of recording video in 1080p resolution at 30 fps, and slow-motion video in 720p at 120 fps. The camera also supports different photo features, such as burst photos, HDR photos, and panoramic photos. The front-facing camera is a FaceTime HD, capable of taking photos at 1.2 MP, and recording video in 720p at 30 fps. That camera also features auto HDR for video recordings, and burst photo capabilities. It is the only iPod to come in a 256 GB storage option, the highest capacity ever offered on an iPod, surpassing the 160 GB capacity of the sixth generation iPod Classic, which had been discontinued in 2014. It is also the only iPod Touch model to natively be able to view the battery percentage without jailbreaking or third-party applications.

=== Design ===
The exterior design of the seventh-generation iPod touch is exactly the same as its predecessor. However, the typeface for the text on the back of the iPod touch was changed to San Francisco.

Back Color Name	Front	Camera Ring	Antenna	Capacities Available
Space Gray	Black	Black	Black	32 GB; 128 GB; 256 GB
Gold	White	Gold	Black	32 GB; 128 GB; 256 GB
Silver	White	Silver	Black	32 GB; 128 GB; 256 GB
Blue	White	Silver	Black	32 GB; 128 GB; 256 GB
Pink	White	Silver	Black	32 GB; 128 GB; 256 GB
(Product) RED	White	Silver	Black	32 GB; 128 GB; 256 GB

=== Accessories ===
The seventh-generation iPod touch was shipped with EarPods, and an Apple Lightning-to-USB charging cable. The device also supports Apple AirPods, EarPods with Lightning Connector, and all Bluetooth headsets.

== See also ==
- List of iPod models
- List of iOS devices

Preceded by iPod Touch (6th generation)	iPod Touch (7th generation); May 2019 – May 2022	Succeeded by Discontinued
