= IPhone X =

2017 smartphone by Apple

iPhone X

- iPhone X in Silver
- Brand: Apple
- Manufacturers: Foxconn (on contract); Pegatron (on contract)
- Type: Smartphone
- Generation: 11th
- First released: November 3, 2017; 9 years ago
- Availability by region: November 3, 2017: Andorra; Australia; Austria; Bahrain; Belgium; Bulgaria; Canada; China; Croatia; Cyprus; Czech Republic; Denmark; Estonia; Finland; France; Germany; Greece; Greenland; Guernsey; Hong Kong; Hungary; Iceland; India; Ireland; Isle of Man; Italy; Japan; Jersey; Kuwait; Latvia; Liechtenstein; Lithuania; Luxembourg; Malta; Mexico; Monaco; Morocco; Netherlands; New Zealand; Norway; Poland; Portugal; Qatar; Romania; Russia; San Marino; Saudi Arabia; Singapore; Slovakia; Slovenia; Spain; Sweden; Switzerland; Taiwan; United Arab Emirates; United Kingdom; United States; November 10, 2017: Israel; November 24, 2017: Albania; Bosnia-Herzegovina; Cambodia; Macau; Macedonia; Malaysia; Montenegro; Nigeria; Serbia; South Africa; South Korea; Thailand; Turkey; December 1, 2017: Armenia; Azerbaijan; Colombia; Georgia; Philippines; December 7, 2017: Bangladesh; Chile; December 8, 2017: Brazil; December 22, 2017: Indonesia
- Discontinued: September 12, 2018; 8 years ago
- Units sold: 63 million units worldwide
- Predecessor: iPhone 7 and iPhone 7 Plus
- Successor: iPhone XS and XS Max
- Related: iPhone 8 and 8 Plus
- Compatible networks: GSM, CDMA2000, 3G, EV-DO, HSPA+, LTE, LTE Advanced
- Form factor: Slate
- Dimensions: H: 143.6 mm (5.65 in); W: 70.9 mm (2.79 in); D: 7.7 mm (0.30 in)
- Weight: 174.1 g (6.14 oz)
- Operating system: Original: iOS 11; Current: iOS 16.7.16, released May 11, 2026
- System-on-chip: Apple A11 Bionic
- CPU: Hexa-core 64-bit (2x high power Monsoon cores at 2.39 GHz + 4x low power Mistral cores at 1.42 GHz)
- GPU: Apple-designed 3 core, up to 409 GFLOPS
- Modem: Models A1865/1902: Qualcomm MDM9655 Snapdragon X16 LTE; Model A1901: Intel XMM 7480
- Memory: 3 GB LPDDR4X
- Storage: 64 or 256 GB NVMe
- Battery: 3.81 V 10.35 W·h (2,716 mA·h) Li-ion
- Rear camera: 12 MP with six-element lens, quad-LED "True Tone" flash with Slow Sync, autofocus, IR filter, burst mode, f/1.8 aperture, 4K video recording at 24, 30, or 60 fps or 1080p at 30 or 60 fps, slow-motion video (1080p at 120 or 240 fps), timelapse with stabilization, panorama, face detection, digital image stabilization, optical image stabilization, telephoto lens with 2× optical zoom / 10× digital zoom Portrait Lighting (in beta), f/2.4 aperture, optical image stabilization
- Front camera: 7 MP, f/2.2 aperture, burst mode, exposure control, face detection, auto-HDR, auto image stabilization, Retina flash, 1080p HD video recording Portrait Mode, Portrait Lighting, and Animoji
- Display: 5.85 in (149 mm) Super Retina HD: AMOLED, 19.5:9, 2436×1125 px resolution (458 ppi), supplied by Samsung Display 625 cd/m^{2} max. brightness (typical), with dual-ion exchange-strengthened glass and 3D Touch
- Sound: Stereo speakers
- Connectivity: All models: LTE (bands 1 to 5, 7, 8, 12, 13, 17 to 20, 25 to 30, 66), TD-LTE (bands 34, 38 to 41), UMTS/HSPA+/DC-HSDPA (850, 900, 1700/2100, 1900, 2100 MHz), GSM/EDGE (850, 900, 1800, 1900 MHz), Wi-Fi (802.11 a/b/g/n/ac), Bluetooth 5, NFC, GPS, GLONASS, Galileo & QZSS; Model A1865: TD-SCDMA 1900 (F), 2000 (A) & CDMA2000 EV-DO Rev. A (800, 1900, 2100 MHz)
- Water resistance: IP67
- Model: A1865 (with Qualcomm modem); A1901 (with Intel modem); A1902 (sold in Japan)
- SAR: Model A1865: Head: 1.09 W/kg; Body: 1.17 W/kg; Model A1901: Head: 1.08 W/kg; Body: 1.17 W/kg; Model A1902: Head: 1.12 W/kg; Body: 1.19 W/kg
- Hearing aid compatibility: M3, T4
- Made in: China
- Other: FaceTime audio- or video-calling, Qi wireless charging, USB-C to Lightning fast charging, Voice over LTE
- Website: iPhone X at the Wayback Machine (archived November 1, 2017)

The iPhone X (Note: Roman numeral "X" pronounced "ten") is a smartphone that was developed and marketed by Apple. It is part of the 11th generation of the iPhone, alongside the lower-end iPhone 8 and 8 Plus released two months prior. Available for pre-order from October 27, 2017, the iPhone X was released on November 3, 2017. The naming of the iPhone X – skipping the iPhone 9 – marked the 10th anniversary of the iPhone.

The iPhone X features a glass and stainless-steel form factor with a bezel-less design. It was the first iPhone without a home button, a change that became standard on all future models. (Note: Excluding the iPhone SE second and third generations, which still used the home button) It was also the first iPhone to use an OLED screen, branded as a Super Retina HD display, one of the most advanced displays for its time. The previous Touch ID authentication, incorporated into the former home button design, was replaced with a new type of authentication called Face ID, which uses sensors to scan the user's face to unlock the device. These facial recognition capabilities also enabled emojis to be animated following the user's expression (Animoji). With a bezel-less design, iPhone user interaction changed significantly, using gestures instead of the traditional home button for navigation.

The iPhone X's price tag of US$999 for the 64 GB version in the United States made it the most expensive iPhone ever at its launch, with even higher prices internationally. Despite its high price, it received positive reviews from critics, who praised its build quality, camera, performance, display, battery life, and Face ID feature, while some criticized the design of the notch. In retrospect, the iPhone X is widely considered to be one of the most influential devices in the history of smartphones as it marked a major shift in the industry regarding design and navigation trends. It is also among the best-selling mobile phones, with over 63 million units sold worldwide.

The iPhone X shipped with iOS 11 and received updates until iOS 16, dropping support for iOS 17. Along with the iPhone 6s, iPhone 6s Plus and iPhone SE (1st generation), it was discontinued on September 12, 2018, following the announcement of the iPhone XS, iPhone XS Max and iPhone XR devices.

== History ==
The technology behind the iPhone X was in development for five years, starting as far back as 2012. Rumors of a drastic iPhone redesign began circulating around the time of the iPhone 7 announcement in the third quarter of 2016, and intensified when a HomePod firmware leak in July 2017 suggested that Apple would soon release a phone with a nearly bezel-less design, lack of a physical home button, facial recognition, and other new features. A near-final development version of the iOS 11 operating system was also leaked in September 2017, confirming the new design and features.

An iPhone X billboard in Manchester, England, 2017

On August 31, 2017, Apple invited journalists to a September 12 press event, the first public event held at the Steve Jobs Theater on the company's new Apple Park campus in Cupertino, California. The iPhone X was unveiled during that keynote. Its US $999 starting price was the most expensive iPhone launch price ever at the time. The price is even higher in international markets due to currency fluctuations, import fees and sales taxes. An instrumental version of the song Keep On Lovin’ by Magnus The Magnus was used in the reveal of the device, and the song "Best Friend" by Sofi Tukker was featured in the introductory film and ads.

An unlocked version of the phone was made available for purchase in the United States on December 5, 2017.

In April 2018, the Federal Communications Commission divulged images of an unreleased gold-colored iPhone X model. As opposed to the space gray and silver color options that the iPhone X ships with, it was discovered that there were initial plans to release a gold option for the device. However, it was put on hold due to production issues. The successors of the iPhone X, the iPhone XS and iPhone XS Max, included a Gold color option, in addition to the Silver and Space Gray featured on the iPhone X.

Apple released a revised B model for the iPhone X that fixed NFC issues for users in Japan, China, and the United States.

=== Design ===
| Color | Name |
|---|---|
| | Silver |
| | Space Gray |

== Hardware ==
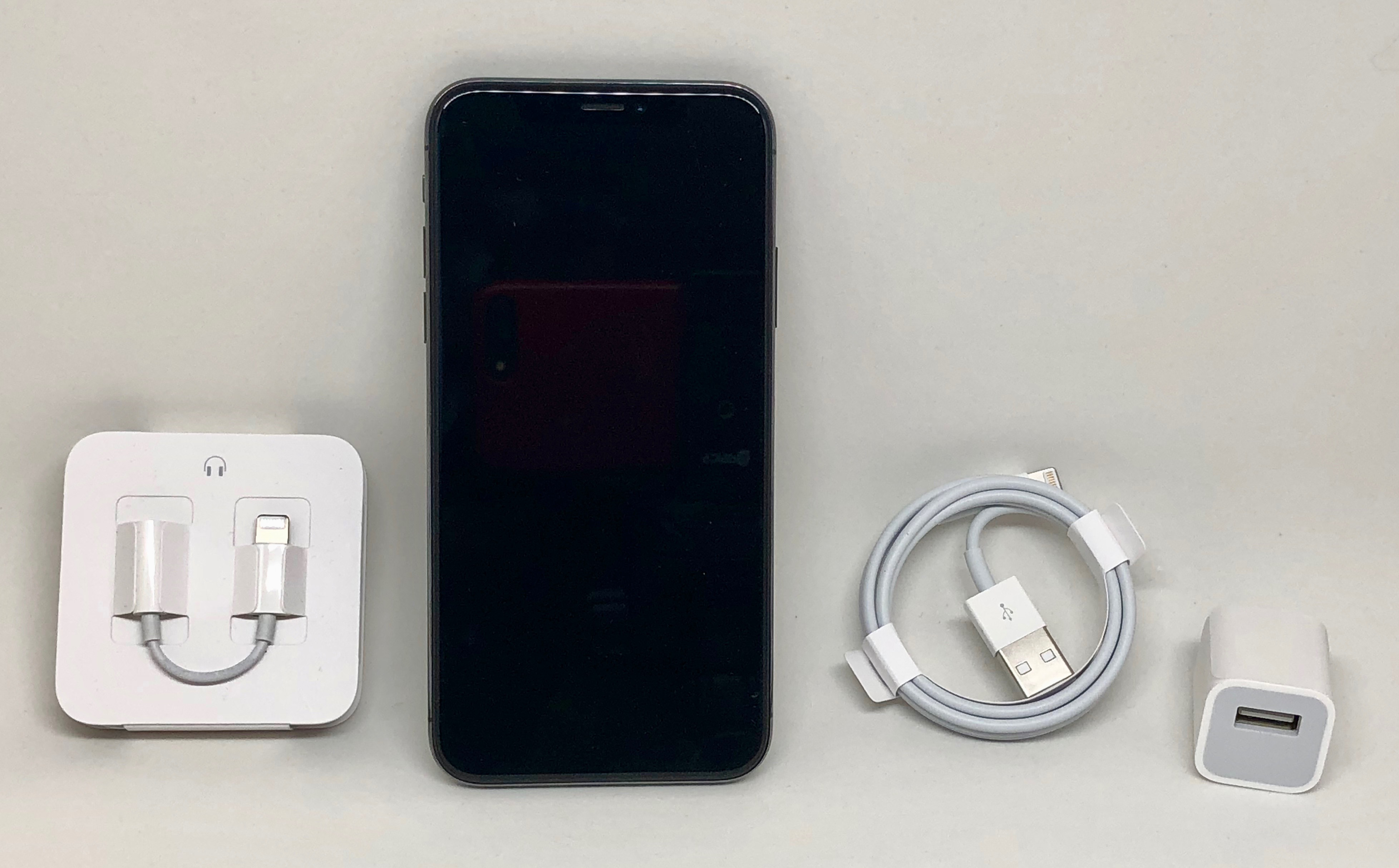
Scope of delivery of the iPhone X

The iPhone X has a 5.85 inch (marketed as 5.8 inch) OLED color-accurate screen that supports DCI-P3 wide color gamut, sRGB, and high dynamic range, and has a contrast ratio of 1,000,000:1. The idea for an all-display smartphone was famously presented by Apple's hardware design team in a meeting, where Tim Cook said "Can we do this?" He also proposed the name "Super Retina Display" instead of the previous "Retina Display".

The Super Retina display has the True Tone technology found on the iPad Pro, which uses ambient light sensors to adapt the display's white balance to the surrounding ambient light.

The iPhone X doubles the touch sampling rate of previous models, from 60 Hz to 120 Hz. However, it does not feature the variable 10–120 Hz ProMotion technology used in the displays of the second-generation iPad Pro released the same year. OLED screen technology has a known negative trend of "burn-in" effects, in which particular elements that are consistently on the screen for long periods of time leave a faint trace even after new images appear. Apple acknowledged that its OLED screens were not excluded from this issue, writing in a support document that "This is also expected behavior".

Greg Joswiak, Apple's vice president of product marketing, told Tom's Guide that the OLED panels Apple used in the iPhone X had been engineered to avoid the over-saturation of colors that using OLED panels typically results in, having made color adjustments and subpixel-level refinements for crisp lines and round corners. For out-of-warranty servicing for damages not relating to manufacturing defects, screen repairs of the iPhone X cost US$279, while other damage repairs cost US$549.

=== Color options ===
The iPhone X has two color options: silver and space gray. The sides of the phone are composed of surgical-grade stainless steel to improve durability, and the front and back are made of glass. The design is intended to be IP67 water and dust resistant.

=== Chipsets ===
The iPhone X contains Apple's A11 Bionic SoC, (system-on-chip) also used in the iPhone 8 and 8 Plus, produced by TSMC, and is a six-core processor with two cores optimized for performance (25% faster than the A10 Fusion processor), along with four cores optimized for efficiency (70% faster than the previous generation). It also features the first Apple-designed graphics processing unit and a Neural Engine, which powers an artificial intelligence accelerator.

=== Biometric authentication ===
Face ID replaces the Touch ID authentication system. The facial recognition sensor consists of three main parts: a dot projector module that projects more than 30,000 infrared dots onto the user's face, an infrared camera module that reads the pattern, and a flood illuminator that illuminates IR light so Face ID works even in pitch black. The pattern is sent to the Secure Enclave in the A11 Bionic chip to confirm a match with the phone owner's face. By default, the system will not work with eyes closed, in an effort to prevent unauthorized access but this requirement can be disabled in settings.

=== Cameras ===
The iPhone X has two cameras on the rear. One is a 12-megapixel wide-angle camera with f/1.8 aperture, with support for face detection, high dynamic range and optical image stabilization. It is capable of capturing 4K video at 24, 30 or 60 frames per second, or 1080p video at 30, 60, 120 or 240 frames per second. A secondary, telephoto lens features 2× optical zoom and 10× digital zoom with an aperture of f/2.4 and optical image stabilization. A Portrait Mode is capable of producing photos with specific depth-of-field and lighting effects. It also has a quad-LED True Tone flash with 2× better light uniformity. Still photos with 6.5 megapixels (3412×1920) can be captured during video recording. iOS 12/13 for the iPhone X did not include Smart HDR or Night Mode, which were kept exclusive to the new iPhone XS/iPhone 11. However, third-party apps brought similar features.

Front camera

On the front of the phone, a 7-megapixel TrueDepth camera has an f/2.2 aperture, and features face detection and HDR. It can capture 1080p video at 30 frames per second, 720p video at 240 frames per second, and exclusively allows for the use of Animoji; animated emojis placed on top of the user's face that intelligently react to the user's facial expressions.

Mono audio

Criticism has been aimed at video footage being recorded with monaural audio (only one audio channel), and at a low bit rate of 96 kbit/s, while earlier mobile phones by competing vendors have been recording with stereo audio (two audio channels for spatiality) and higher bit rates, such as the Samsung Galaxy S3 and Sony Xperia S, both unveiled in 2012.

=== Others ===
The iPhone X is the first iPhone to feature Tap to Wake.

=== Wireless charging ===
The iPhone X also supports the Qi standard of wireless charging. In tests conducted by MacRumors, the iPhone X's charging speeds vary significantly depending on what types of cables, powerbanks, adapters, or wireless chargers are used.

=== Software ===
Due to its different screen layout, iOS developers are required to update their apps to make full use of the additional screen real estate. Such changes include rounded corners, the sensor "notch" at the top of the screen, and an indicator area at the bottom for accessing the home screen. Apple published a "Human Interface Guidelines" document to explain areas of focus, and discouraged developers from attempting to mask or call special attention to any of the new changes. Additionally, text within the app needs to be configured to properly reference Face ID rather than Touch ID where the authentication technology is used on the iPhone X. In anticipation of the release of the phone, most major apps were quickly updated to support the new changes brought by the iPhone X, though the required changes did cause delayed app updates for some major apps.

The traditional home button, found on all previous devices in the iPhone lineup, has been removed entirely, replaced by touch-based gestures. To wake up the device, users can tap the display or use the side button; to access the home screen, users must swipe up from the bottom of the display; and to access the multitasking window, users must swipe up similarly to the method of accessing the home screen, but stop while the finger is in the middle of the screen, causing an app carousel to appear.

The iPhone X shipped with iOS 11, and supports iOS 12, iOS 13, iOS 14, iOS 15, and iOS 16. The iPhone X does not support iOS 17 and higher, purportedly due to hardware limitations.

== Reception ==
=== General reviews ===
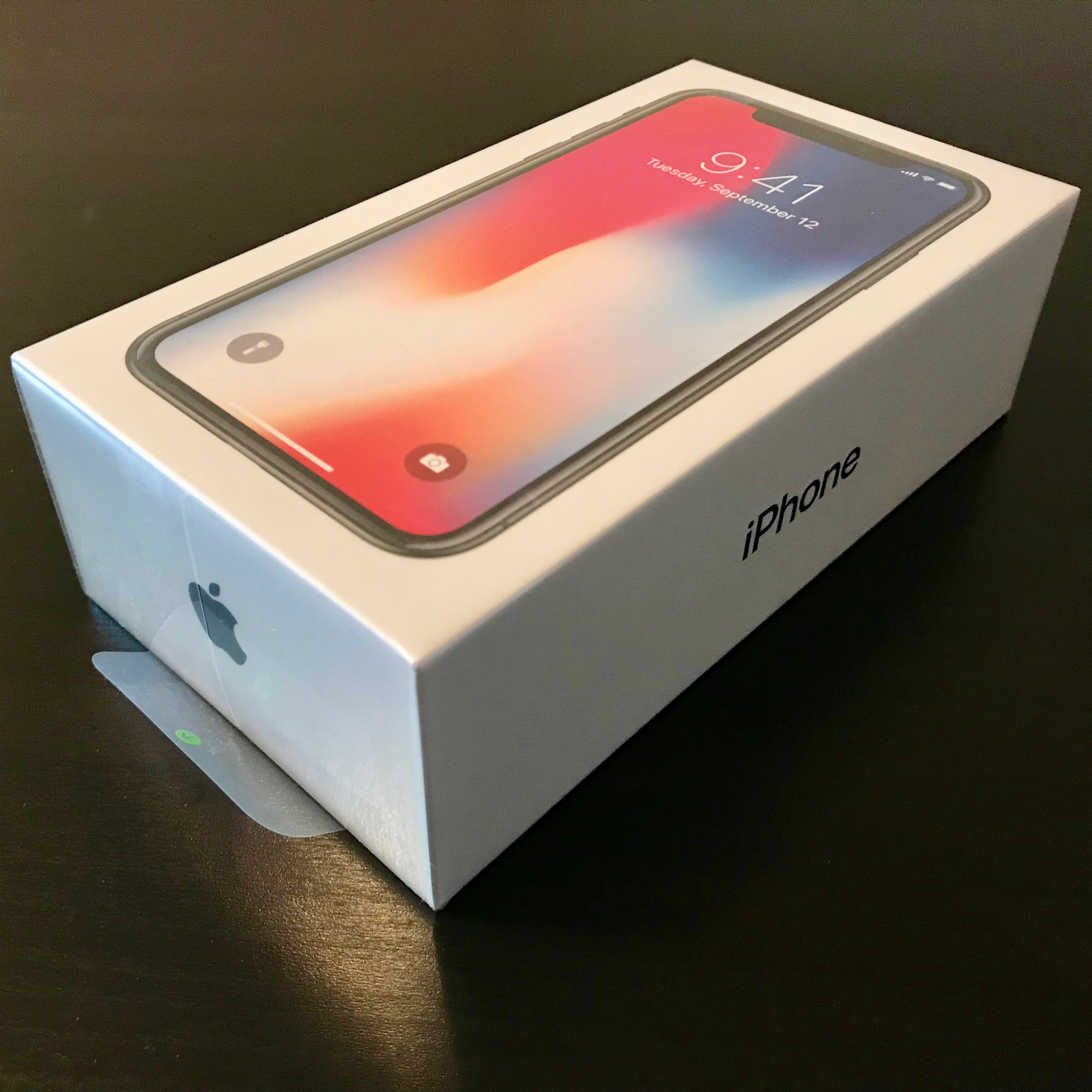
Packaging box of the iPhone X

The iPhone X received positive reviews. Its display and build quality were strongly praised, and the camera also scored positively on tests. However, the sensor housing "notch" at the top of the screen and the introduction of an all-new authentication method were polarizing for critics and consumers. The notch was heavily mocked by users on social media, although app developers responded either neutrally or positively to the changes it brought to the user experience in their apps and games. Face ID facial recognition was praised for its simple setup, but criticized for requiring direct eyes on the screen, though that option can be disabled within the system preferences.

The iPhone X's rear camera received an overall rating of 97 from DxOMark, a camera testing company – just behind Google's Pixel 2, which received 98 and short of the highest score of 99, awarded to Samsung's Galaxy S9+ smartphone. Consumer Reports, a non-profit, independent organization aiming to write impartial reviews of consumer products, ranked the iPhone X below the iPhone 8 and iPhone 8 Plus, as well as below Samsung's Galaxy S8, S8+ and Note 8, due to less durability and shorter battery life, although it praised the X's camera as "the highest-rated smartphone camera" it had ever tested.

Chris Velazco of Engadget praised the display, writing that, in his experience, the sensor "notch" goes from being "weird at first" to not being noticeable due to action in videos usually happening in the center. The build quality was given particular acclaim, being called "a beautifully made device" with a construction that "seamlessly" connects the front and back glass with the stainless-steel frame. Velazco noted that the new gesture-based interaction takes time to get used to, particularly the Control Center being moved from the bottom to the top right of the display. The camera, processor performance, and battery life were also given positive thoughts.

Nilay Patel of The Verge also praised the display, calling it "polished and tight" and "bright and colorful". He criticized the repeated lack of a headphone jack, the device's fragility despite Apple's claims of durability, and the sensor notch, calling it "ugly". Patel highlighted the fact that apps required updates to fit the new screen, writing that not all popular apps had received updates by the time of the review, resulting in some apps with "huge black borders" resembling the iPhone 8. He especially criticized the positioning of the sensor notch while holding the phone in landscape mode, causing the notch to go "from being a somewhat forgettable element in the top status bar to a giant interruption on the side of the screen". The cameras were given positive feedback for maintaining detail in low-light. Patel particularly praised Animoji, calling it "probably the single best feature on the iPhone X", writing that "they just work, and they work incredibly well". Finally, he wrote that Face ID was the whole foundation of the iPhone X, and stated that it "generally works great", though acknowledging the occasional misstep, in which users must "actively move the phone closer to your face to compensate". He specifically criticized the limited range of Face ID, with authentication only working when holding the phone 25–50 centimeters away from the face.

The cost of repairing an iPhone X is also very large compared to its predecessors. If the iPhone X is damaged by user damage (not a manufacturing defect), screen repairs cost US$279, and other repairs like replacing iPhone X batteries are more expensive.

In a heavily negative review, Dennis Green of Business Insider significantly criticized the impossible one-handed use of the iPhone X, writing that the new gestures to use the phone, such as swiping from the top down to access notifications and the Control Center, did not work when using the phone with only one hand due to not being able to reach the top. His review sparked outrage among Twitter users, many of whom used condescending tones, which Green reasoned as "I don't know whether the anger was directed toward me out of loyalty to Apple or to justify their own choice to spend $1,000 on a phone. It was obvious that much of the criticism came from people who had never used the phone".

Macworld's Roman Loyola praised the Face ID authentication system, writing that the setup process was "easy" and that its system integration was "more seamless" than the Touch ID fingerprint authentication of the past. That said, Loyola did note the "half-second" slower unlocking time than Touch ID as well as needing to look directly at the screen, making it impossible to unlock with the phone next to the user on a desk.

In retrospect, many reviewers described the iPhone X as one of the most influential devices in smartphone history as it marked a major shift in the industry with regard to smartphone design and navigation trends.

=== Face ID security and privacy concerns ===
Face ID has raised concerns regarding the possibility of law enforcement accessing an individual's phone by pointing the device at the user's face. United States Senator Al Franken asked Apple to provide more information on the security and privacy of Face ID a day after the announcement, with Apple responding by highlighting the recent publication of a security white paper and knowledge base detailing answers.

Inconsistent results have been shown when testing Face ID on identical twins, with some tests showing the system managing to separate the two, while other tests have failed.

Despite Apple's promise of increased security of Face ID compared to the Touch ID fingerprint authentication system, there have been multiple media reports indicating otherwise. The Verge noted that courts in the United States have granted different Fifth Amendment rights in the United States Constitution to biometric unlocking systems as opposed to keycodes. Keycodes are considered "testimonial" evidence based on the contents of users' thoughts, whereas fingerprints are considered physical evidence, with some suspects having been ordered to unlock their phones via fingerprint. Many attempts to break through Face ID with sophisticated masks have been attempted, though all have failed. A week after the iPhone X was released, Vietnamese security firm Bkav announced in a blog post that it had successfully created a $150 mask that tricked Face ID, though Wired noted that Bkav's technique was more of a "proof-of-concept" rather than active exploitation risk, with the technique requiring a detailed measurement or digital scan of the iPhone owner's face, putting the real risk of danger only to targets of espionage and world leaders.

Additionally, Reuters reported in early November 2017 that Apple would share certain facial data on users with third-party app developers for more precise selfie filters and for fictional game characters to mirror real-world user facial expressions. Although developers are required to seek customer permission, and are forbidden to sell the data to others, create profiles on users, or use the data for advertising, alongside being limited to a more "rough map" rather than full capabilities, they still get access to over 50 kinds of facial expressions. The American Civil Liberties Union (ACLU) and the Center for Democracy and Technology raised privacy questions about Apple's enforcement of the privacy restrictions connected to third-party access, with Apple maintaining that its App Store review processes were effective safeguards. The "rough map" of facial data third-parties can access is also not enough to unlock the device, according to Reuters. However, the overall idea of letting developers access sensitive facial information was still not satisfactorily handled, according to Jay Stanley, a senior policy analyst with the ACLU, with Stanley telling Reuters that "the privacy issues around of the use of very sophisticated facial recognition technology for unlocking the phone have been overblown. ... The real privacy issues have to do with the access by third-party developers".

=== Notch controversy ===
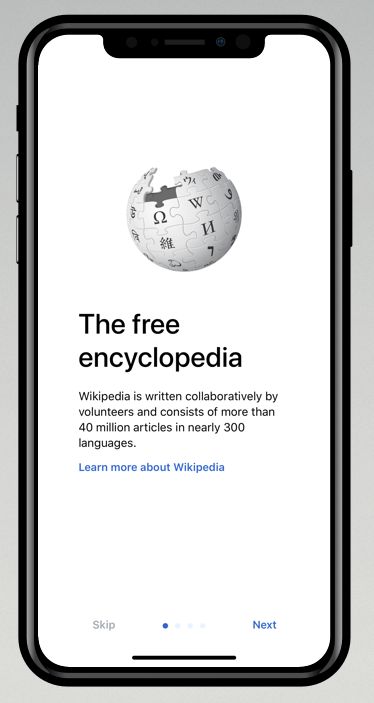
The iPhone X's notch was met with mixed response as some reviewers found it visually unappealing or disturbing.

Much of the debate about the iPhone X has revolved around the design of the Face ID sensor housing, dubbed "notch" by the media, at the top of the display. The Outline described it as "a visually disgusting element", and The Verge posted a report focusing on public criticism and people mocking Apple's "odd design choice", but not every reviewer was equally negative in their opinions. Third-party iOS developers interviewed by Ars Technica said that, despite the work of restructuring design elements in their apps, the notch did not cause any problems, with some even arguing that the notch was a good push to simplify their designs. Two weeks after the iPhone X's release, Apple approved a "notch remover" app through the App Store, that adds a black bar at the top of images, which can then be used as a wallpaper to make the notch visually disappear. The approval was done despite the company's user interface guidelines discouraging developers from specifically masking the design. The iPhone X was not the first device with a notch; both the Essential Phone and Sharp Aquos S2 were announced before it and had a display notch, albeit much smaller, but the iPhone X arguably popularized it.

== Technical issues ==
=== Early activation issues ===
In November 2017, early adopters of the new phone reported that they were experiencing activation issues on certain cellular carriers, most notably AT&T. AT&T announced within hours that the issue had been fixed on their end, and a spokesperson for the Verizon carrier told the media none of its customers were affected despite some reports of problems.

=== Cold weather issues ===
In November 2017, iPhone X users reported on Reddit that the device's screen would become unresponsive after experiencing rapid temperature drops. Apple released the iOS 11.1.2 update on November 16, 2017, fixing the issue.

Forbes contributor Gordon Kelly reported in March 2018 that over 1,000 users had experienced problems using camera flash in cold weather, with this problem being fixed in a later software update.

=== Cellular modem differences ===
Apple has been engaged in a legal battle with Qualcomm over allegedly anti-competitive practices and has been dual-sourcing cellular modem chips to reduce reliance on the semiconductor manufacturer. Starting with iPhone 7 in 2016, Apple has used about half Qualcomm modem chips and half Intel. Professional measurement tests performed by wireless signal testing firm Cellular Insights indicated that, as in the previous-gen iPhone 7, Qualcomm's chips outperform Intel's in LTE download speeds, up to 67% faster in very weak signal conditions, resulting in some sources recommending the purchase of an unlocked iPhone X or one bought through cellular carrier Verizon, in order to get the models featuring the faster Qualcomm modem. Additionally, CNET reported in September 2017 that the new iPhone models, including X, 8 and 8 Plus, do not have the ability to connect to the next-generation of wireless LTE data connection, despite 10 new Android devices, including flagships from main smartphone competitor Samsung, all having the capability to do so. While Apple's new smartphones have support for "LTE Advanced", with a theoretical peak speed of 500 megabits per second, the Android models have the ability to connect to "Gigabit LTE", allowing theoretical speeds up to 1 gigabit per second, doubling Apple's speed.

=== NFC problems ===
After releasing the iPhone X in Japan and China, customers experienced issues related to the phone's NFC while trying to access public transit smart card readers. In April 2018, Apple released a revision to the iPhone X, that included a vastly improved NFC chip. This solved the problem of NFC reader errors in most cases. Previously, around 1 out of 3 NFC attempts would fail after initial reports. This issue also affected users in America.

=== Display Module Replacement Program ===
Apple has determined an issue with certain iPhone X devices where the display would not respond to the user's touch, due to a component that might fail on the display module. Apple stated that they will repair the affected devices free of charge, so long as the device is under 3 years old.

== See also ==
- List of iPhone models
- History of iPhone
- Timeline of iPhone models

== Notes ==
| Preceded by iPhone 7 / 7 Plus | iPhone; 11th generation alongside iPhone 8 / 8 Plus | Succeeded by iPhone XS / XS Max |
