= History of smartphones =

The first commercial smartphones are widely recognized to be the IBM Simon Personal Communicator, released in 1992, and General Magic's Magic Cap devices released by Sony ('magic link') and Motorola ('envoy') in 1994.

== Origins ==
Early smartphones were marketed primarily towards the enterprise market, attempting to bridge the functionality of standalone PDA devices with support for cellular telephony, but were limited by their bulky form, short battery life, slow analog cellular networks, and the immaturity of wireless data services. These issues were eventually resolved with the exponential scaling and miniaturization of MOS transistors down to sub-micron levels (Moore's law), the improved lithium-ion battery, faster digital mobile data networks (Edholm's law), and more mature software platforms that allowed mobile device ecosystems to develop independently of data providers.

The term "smart phone" (in two words) appeared in press since 1980, "SmartPhone" since 1985, and "Smartphone" since 1987. The term "smartphone" (as one lowercase word) was first used by Ericsson in 1997 to describe a new device concept, the GS88.

=== Forerunners ===
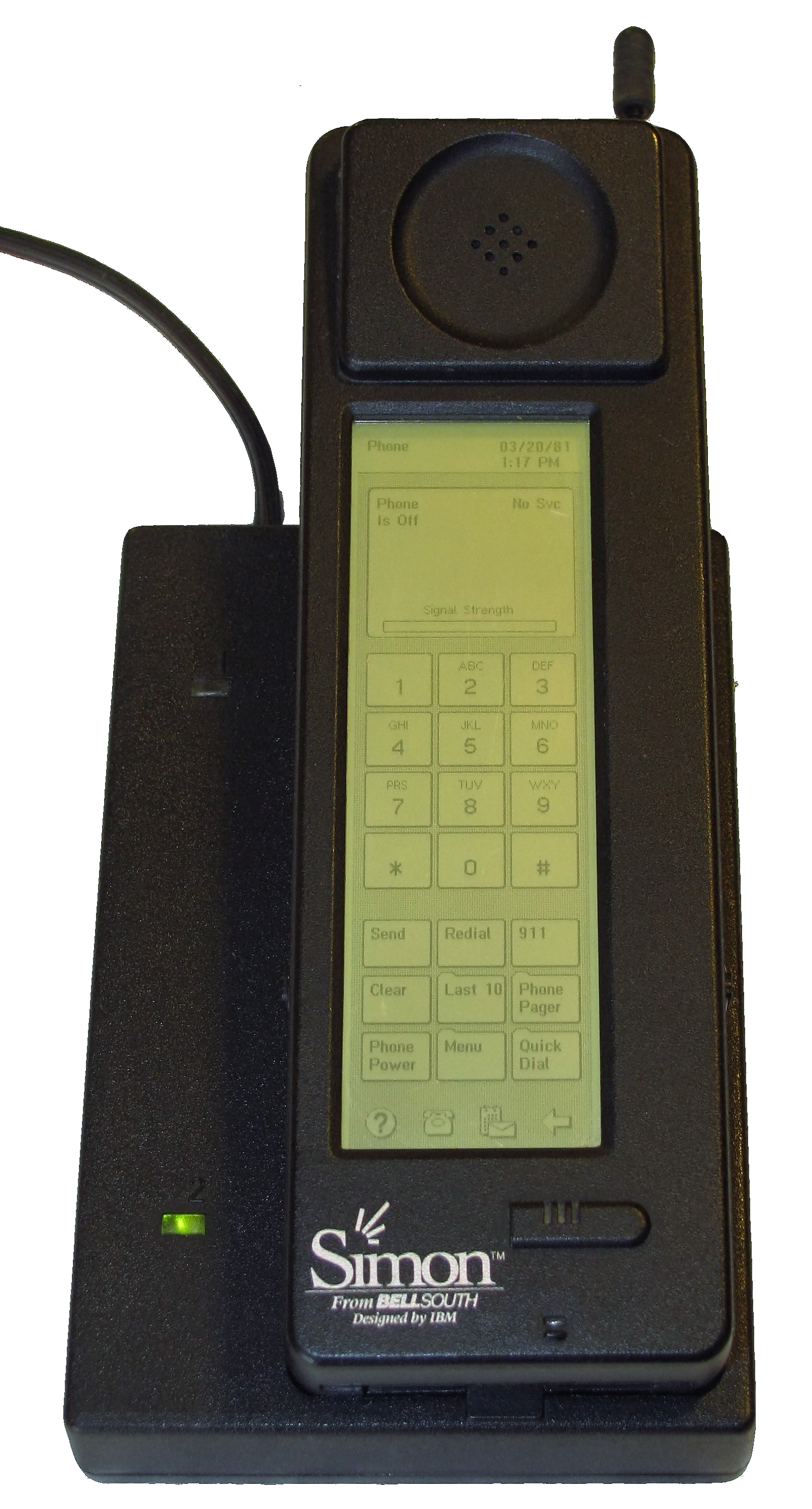
IBM Simon and charging base (1994)

In the early 1990s, IBM engineer Frank Canova developed a prototype that combined the functions of a mobile phone and a personal digital assistant (PDA). The prototype was demonstrated at the COMDEX computer industry trade show in November 1992. It included sample apps for stocks, news, sports, weather and other cloud services that are commonplace today. A refined version was marketed to consumers by BellSouth in 1994 as the Simon Personal Communicator.

The Simon combined cellular telephone functions with PDA features. It had a touchscreen and stylus and could make and receive telephone calls, send and receive faxes and email, and provide applications such as an address book, calendar, appointment scheduler, calculator, world clock, and notepad. It is widely regarded as an important forerunner of the modern smartphone because it combined mobile telephony with computing and personal information-management functions in a single handheld device.

The IBM Simon was manufactured by Mitsubishi Electric, which integrated features with its own cellular radio technologies. It featured a liquid-crystal display (LCD) and PC Card support. The Simon was commercially unsuccessful, particularly due to its bulky form factor and limited battery life, using NiCad batteries rather than the nickel–metal hydride batteries commonly used in mobile phones in the 1990s, or lithium-ion batteries used in modern smartphones. A smart phone approach with devices, third party apps, and cloud services founded in 1990 as a spin out from Apple Computer and shipped in 1994, was early smart phone Magic Cap software from General Magic which ran on reference devices and commercial products by Sony ('magic link') and Motorola ('envoy').

=== PDA/phone hybrids ===
Beginning in the mid-to-late 1990s, many people who had mobile phones carried a separate dedicated PDA device, running early versions of operating systems such as Palm OS, Newton OS, Symbian or Windows CE/Pocket PC. These operating systems would later evolve into early mobile operating systems. Most of the "smartphones" in this era were hybrid devices that combined these existing familiar PDA OSes with basic phone hardware. The results were devices that were bulkier than either dedicated mobile phones or PDAs, but allowed a limited amount of cellular Internet access. PDA and mobile phone manufacturers competed in reducing the size of devices. The bulk of these smartphones combined with their high cost and expensive data plans, plus other drawbacks such as expansion limitations and decreased battery life compared to separate standalone devices, generally limited their popularity to "early adopters" and business users who needed portable connectivity.

In March 1996, Hewlett-Packard released the OmniGo 700LX, a modified HP 200LX palmtop PC with a Nokia 2110 mobile phone piggybacked onto it and ROM-based software to support it. It had a 640 × 200 resolution CGA compatible four-shade gray-scale LCD screen and could be used to place and receive calls, and to create and receive text messages, emails and faxes. It was also 100% MS-DOS 5.0 compatible, allowing it to run thousands of existing software titles, including early versions of Windows.

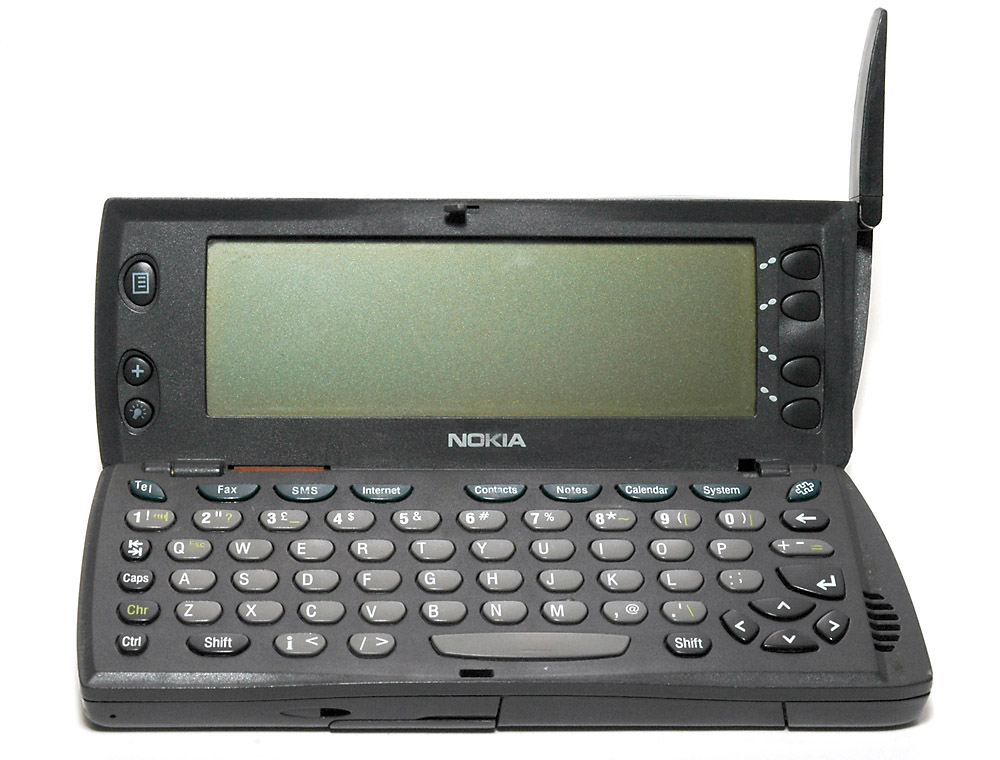
The Nokia 9110 Communicator, opened for access to keyboard

In August 1996, Nokia released the Nokia 9000 Communicator, a digital cellular PDA based on the Nokia 2110 with an integrated system based on the PEN/GEOS 3.0 operating system from Geoworks. The two components were attached by a hinge in what became known as a clamshell design, with the display above and a physical QWERTY keyboard below. The PDA provided e-mail; calendar, address book, calculator and notebook applications; text-based Web browsing; and could send and receive faxes. When closed, the device could be used as a digital cellular telephone.

In June 1999, Qualcomm released the "pdQ Smartphone", a CDMA digital PCS smartphone with an integrated Palm PDA and Internet connectivity.

Subsequent landmark devices included:

- The Ericsson R380 (December 2000) by Ericsson Mobile Communications, the first phone running the operating system later named Symbian (it ran EPOC Release 5, which was renamed Symbian OS at Release 6). It had PDA functionality and limited Web browsing on a resistive touchscreen utilizing a stylus. While it was marketed as a "smartphone", users could not install their own software on the device.
- The Kyocera 6035 (February 2001), a dual-nature device with a separate Palm OS PDA operating system and CDMA mobile phone firmware. It supported limited Web browsing with the PDA software treating the phone hardware as an attached modem.
- The Nokia 9210 Communicator (June 2001), the first phone running Symbian (Release 6) with Nokia's Series 80 platform (v1.0). This was the first Symbian phone platform allowing the installation of additional applications. Like the Nokia 9000 Communicator, it is a large clamshell device with a full physical QWERTY keyboard inside.
- Handspring's Treo 180 (2002), the first smartphone that fully integrated the Palm OS on a GSM mobile phone having telephony, SMS messaging and Internet access built into the OS. The 180 model had a thumb-type keyboard and the 180g version had a Graffiti handwriting recognition area, instead.

=== Japanese cell phones ===
In 1999, Japanese wireless provider NTT DoCoMo launched i-mode, a new mobile internet platform which provided data transmission speeds up to 9.6 kilobits per second, and access web services available through the platform such as online shopping. NTT DoCoMo's i-mode used cHTML, a language which restricted some aspects of traditional HTML in favor of increasing data speed for the devices. Limited functionality, small screens and limited bandwidth allowed for phones to use the slower data speeds available. The rise of i-mode helped NTT DoCoMo accumulate an estimated 40 million subscribers by the end of 2001, and ranked first in market capitalization in Japan and second globally.

Japanese cell phones increasingly diverged from global standards and trends to offer other forms of advanced services and smartphone-like functionality that were specifically tailored to the Japanese market, such as mobile payments and shopping, near-field communication (NFC) allowing mobile wallet functionality to replace smart cards for transit fares, loyalty cards, identity cards, event tickets, coupons, money transfer, etc., downloadable content like musical ringtones, games, and comics, and 1seg mobile television. Phones built by Japanese manufacturers used custom firmware, however, and did not yet feature standardized mobile operating systems designed to cater to third-party application development, so their software and ecosystems were akin to very advanced feature phones. As with other feature phones, additional software and services required partnerships and deals with providers.

The degree of integration between phones and carriers, unique phone features, non-standardized platforms, and tailoring to Japanese culture made it difficult for Japanese manufacturers to export their phones, especially when demand was so high in Japan that the companies did not feel the need to look elsewhere for additional profits.

The rise of 3G technology in other markets and non-Japanese phones with powerful standardized smartphone operating systems, app stores, and advanced wireless network capabilities allowed non-Japanese phone manufacturers to finally break in to the Japanese market, gradually adopting Japanese phone features like emojis, mobile payments, and NFC and spreading them to the rest of the world.

=== Early smartphones ===
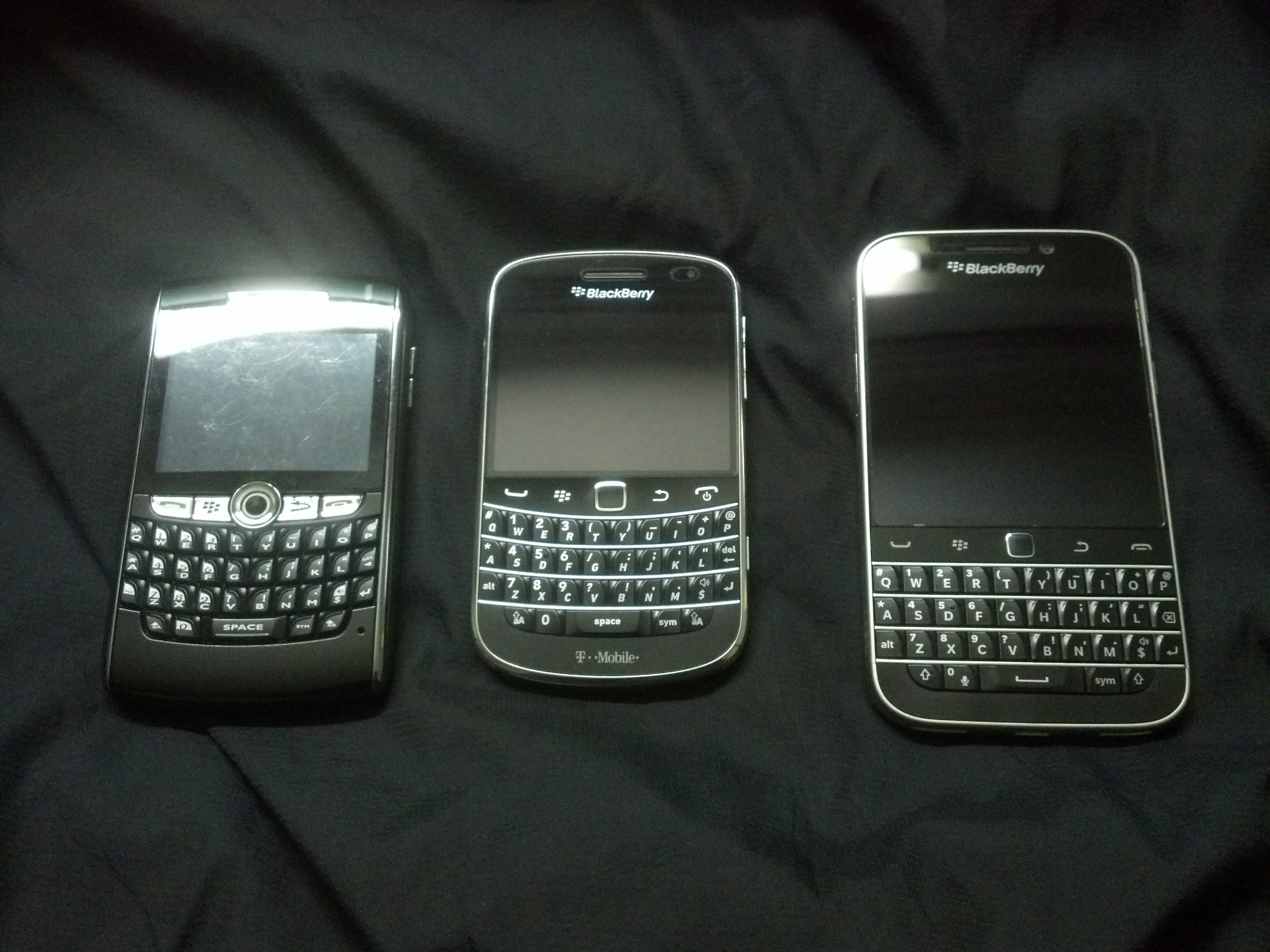
Several BlackBerry smartphones, which were highly popular in the mid-late 2000s

Phones that made effective use of any significant data connectivity were still rare outside Japan until the introduction of the Danger Hiptop in 2002, which saw moderate success among U.S. consumers as the T-Mobile Sidekick. Later, in the mid-2000s, business users in the U.S. started to adopt devices based on Microsoft's Windows Mobile, and then BlackBerry smartphones from Research In Motion. American users popularized the term "CrackBerry" in 2006 due to the BlackBerry's addictive nature. In the U.S., the high cost of data plans and relative rarity of devices with Wi-Fi capabilities that could avoid cellular data network usage kept adoption of smartphones mainly to business professionals and "early adopters".

Outside the U.S. and Japan, Nokia was seeing success with its smartphones based on Symbian, originally developed by Psion for their personal organisers, and it was the most popular smartphone OS in Europe during the middle to late 2000s. Initially, Nokia's Symbian smartphones were focused on business with the Eseries, similar to Windows Mobile and BlackBerry devices at the time. From 2002 onwards, Nokia started producing consumer-focused smartphones, popularized by the entertainment-focused Nseries. Until 2010, Symbian was the world's most widely used smartphone operating system.

The touchscreen personal digital assistant (PDA)–derived nature of adapted operating systems like Palm OS, the "Pocket PC" versions of what was later Windows Mobile, and the UIQ interface that was originally designed for pen-based PDAs on Symbian OS devices resulted in some early smartphones having stylus-based interfaces. These allowed for virtual keyboards and handwriting input, thus also allowing easy entry of Asian characters.

By the mid-2000s, the majority of smartphones had a physical QWERTY keyboard. Most used a "keyboard bar" form factor, like the BlackBerry line, Windows Mobile smartphones, Palm Treos, and some of the Nokia Eseries. A few hid their full physical QWERTY keyboard in a sliding form factor, like the Danger Hiptop line. Some even had only a numeric keypad using T9 text input, like the Nokia Nseries and other models in the Nokia Eseries. Resistive touchscreens with stylus-based interfaces could still be found on a few smartphones, like the Palm Treos, which had dropped their handwriting input after a few early models that were available in versions with Graffiti instead of a keyboard.

== Evolution during the 2000s and 2010s ==
=== Form factor and operating system shifts ===
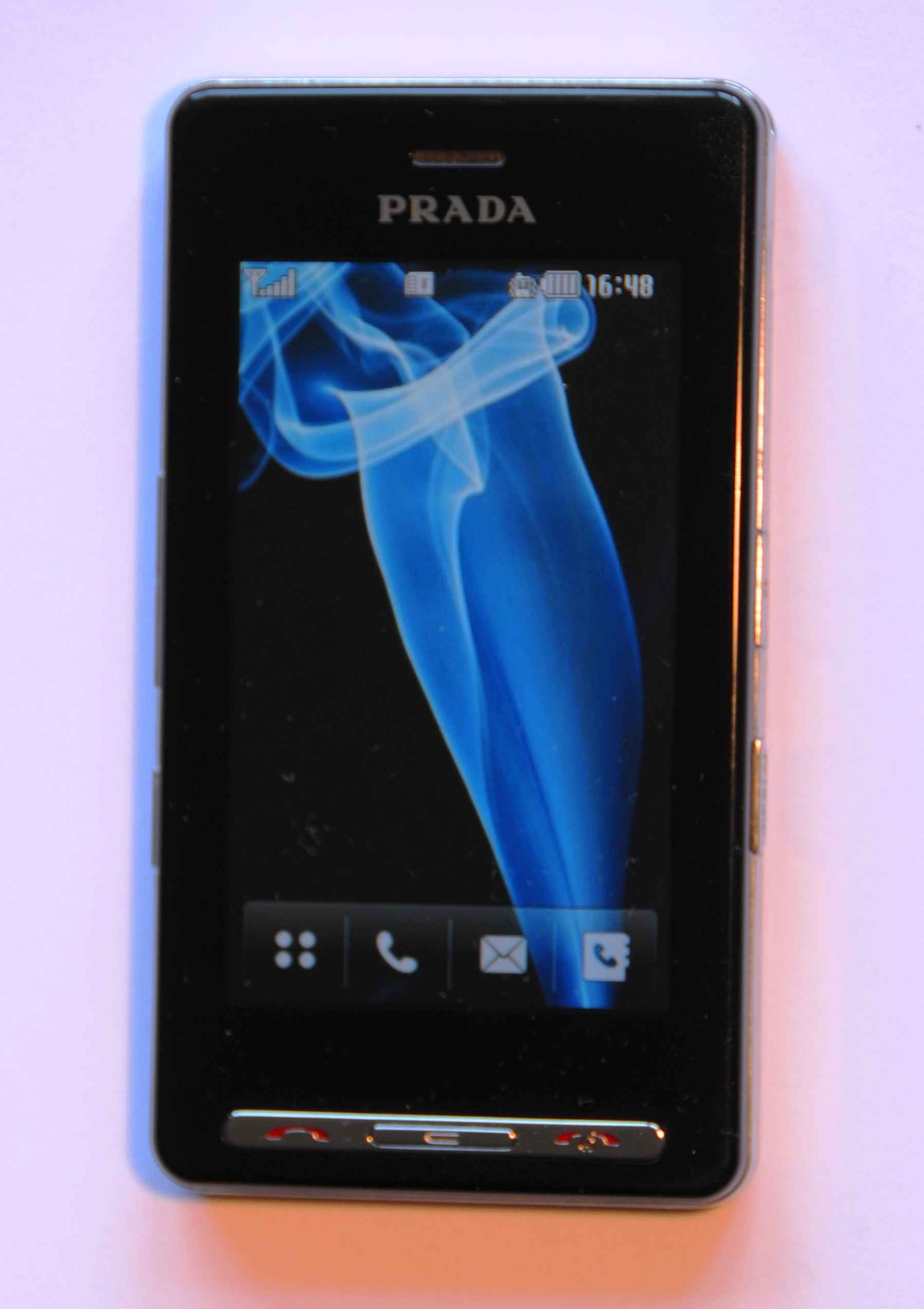
The LG Prada with a large capacitive touchscreen introduced in 2006

The original iPhone; following its introduction in 2007, the common smartphone form factor shifted to large touchscreen software interfaces without physical keypads

The late 2000s and early 2010s saw a shift in smartphone interfaces away from devices with physical keyboards and keypads to ones with large finger-operated capacitive touchscreens. The first phone of any kind with a large capacitive touchscreen was the LG Prada, announced by LG in December 2006. This was a fashionable feature phone created in collaboration with Italian luxury designer Prada with a 3" 240 x 400 pixel screen, a 2-Megapixel digital camera with 144p video recording ability, an LED flash, and a miniature mirror for self portraits.

In January 2007, Apple introduced the iPhone. It had a 3.5" capacitive touchscreen with twice the common resolution of most smartphone screens at the time, and introduced multi-touch to phones, which allowed gestures such as "pinching" to zoom in or out on photos, maps, and web pages. The iPhone was notable as being the first device of its kind targeted at the mass market to abandon the use of a stylus, keyboard, or keypad typical of contemporary smartphones, instead using a large touchscreen for direct finger input as its main means of interaction.

The iPhone's operating system was also a shift away from older operating systems (which older phones supported and which were adapted from PDAs and feature phones) to an operative system powerful enough to not require using a limited, stripped down web browser that can only render pages specially formatted using technologies such as WML, cHTML, or XHTML and instead ran a version of Apple's Safari browser that could render full websites not specifically designed for mobile phones.

Later Apple shipped a software update that gave the iPhone a built-in on-device App Store allowing direct wireless downloads of third-party software. This kind of centralized App Store and free developer tools quickly became the new main paradigm for all smartphone platforms for software development, distribution, discovery, installation, and payment, in place of expensive developer tools that required official approval to use and a dependence on third-party sources providing applications for multiple platforms.

The advantages of a design with software powerful enough to support advanced applications and a large capacitive touchscreen affected the development of another smartphone OS platform, Android, with a more BlackBerry-like prototype device scrapped in favor of a touchscreen device with a slide-out physical keyboard, as Google's engineers thought at the time that a touchscreen could not completely replace a physical keyboard and buttons. Android is based around a modified Linux kernel, again providing more power than mobile operating systems adapted from PDAs and feature phones. The first Android device, the horizontal-sliding HTC Dream, was released on October 20, 2008.

In 2012, Asus started experimenting with a convertible docking system named PadFone, where the standalone handset can when necessary be inserted into a tablet-sized screen unit with integrated supportive battery and used as such.

In 2013 and 2014, Samsung experimented with the hybrid combination of compact camera and smartphone, releasing the Galaxy S4 Zoom and K Zoom, each equipped with integrated 10× optical zoom lens and manual parameter settings (including manual exposure and focus) years before these were widely adapted among smartphones. The S4 Zoom additionally has a rotary knob ring around the lens and a tripod mount.

==== Operating system competition ====
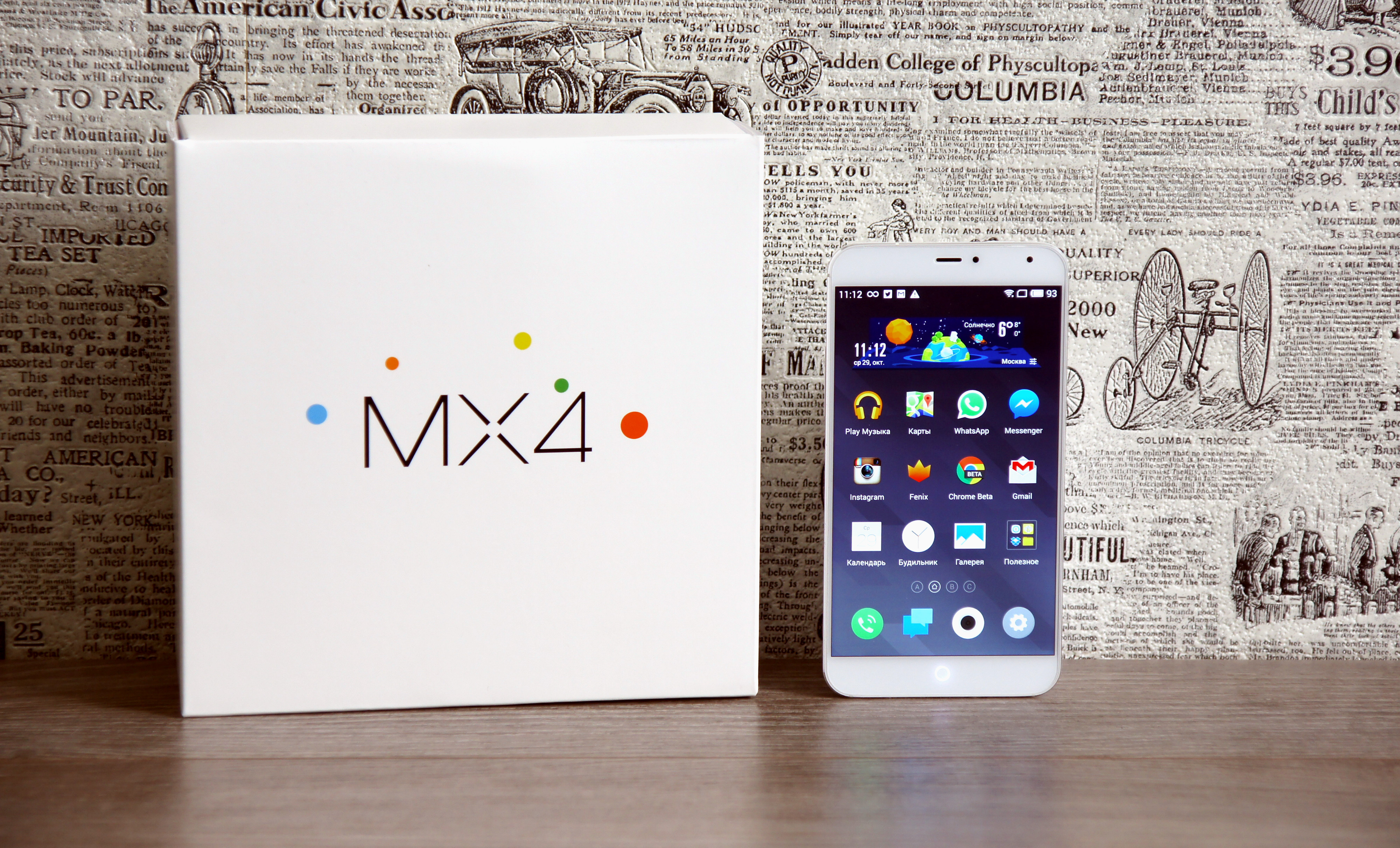
A Meizu MX4 with Flyme OS

The iPhone and later touchscreen-only Android devices together popularized the slate form factor, based on a large capacitive touchscreen as the sole means of interaction, and led to the decline of earlier, keyboard- and keypad-focused platforms. Later, navigation keys such as the home, back, menu, task and search buttons have also been increasingly replaced by nonphysical touch keys, then virtual, simulated on-screen navigation keys, commonly with access combinations such as a long press of the task key to simulate a short menu key press, as with home button to search. More recent "bezel-less" types have their screen surface space extended to the unit's front bottom to compensate for the display area lost for simulating the navigation keys. While virtual keys offer more potential customizability, their location may be inconsistent among systems depending on screen rotation and software used.

Multiple vendors attempted to update or replace their existing smartphone platforms and devices to better-compete with Android and the iPhone; Palm unveiled a new platform known as webOS for its Palm Pre in late-2009 to replace Palm OS, which featured a focus on a task-based "card" metaphor and seamless synchronization and integration between various online services (as opposed to the then-conventional concept of a smartphone needing a PC to serve as a "canonical, authoritative repository" for user data). HP acquired Palm in 2010 and released several other webOS devices, including the Pre 3 and HP TouchPad tablet. As part of a proposed divestment of its consumer business to focus on enterprise software, HP abruptly ended development of future webOS devices in August 2011, and sold the rights to webOS to LG Electronics in 2013, for use as a smart TV platform.

Research in Motion introduced the vertical-sliding BlackBerry Torch and BlackBerry OS 6 in 2010, which featured a redesigned user interface, support for gestures such as pinch-to-zoom, and a new web browser based on the same WebKit rendering engine used by the iPhone. The following year, RIM released BlackBerry OS 7 and new models in the Bold and Torch ranges, which included a new Bold with a touchscreen alongside its keyboard, and the Torch 9860—the first BlackBerry phone to not include a physical keyboard. In 2013, it replaced the legacy BlackBerry OS with a revamped, QNX-based platform known as BlackBerry 10, with the all-touch BlackBerry Z10 and keyboard-equipped Q10 as launch devices.

In 2010, Microsoft unveiled a replacement for Windows Mobile known as Windows Phone, featuring a new touchscreen-centric user interface built around flat design and typography, a home screen with "live tiles" containing feeds of updates from apps, as well as integrated Microsoft Office apps. In February 2011, Nokia announced that it had entered into a major partnership with Microsoft, under which it would exclusively use Windows Phone on all of its future smartphones, and integrate Microsoft's Bing search engine and Bing Maps (which, as part of the partnership, would also license Nokia Maps data) into all future devices. The announcement led to the abandonment of both Symbian, as well as MeeGo—a Linux-based mobile platform it was co-developing with Intel. Nokia's low-end Lumia 520 saw strong demand and helped Windows Phone gain niche popularity in some markets, overtaking BlackBerry in global market share in 2013.

In mid-June 2012, Meizu released its mobile operating system, Flyme OS.

Many of these attempts to compete with Android and iPhone were short-lived. Over the course of the decade, the two platforms became a clear duopoly in smartphone sales and market share, with BlackBerry, Windows Phone, and other operating systems eventually stagnating to little or no measurable market share. In 2015, BlackBerry began to pivot away from its in-house mobile platforms in favor of producing Android devices, focusing on a security-enhanced distribution of the software. The following year, the company announced that it would also exit the hardware market to focus more on software and its enterprise middleware, and began to license the BlackBerry brand and its Android distribution to third-party OEMs such as TCL for future devices.

In September 2013, Microsoft announced its intent to acquire Nokia's mobile device business for $7.1 billion, as part of a strategy under CEO Steve Ballmer for Microsoft to be a "devices and services" company. Despite the growth of Windows Phone and the Lumia range (which accounted for nearly 90% of all Windows Phone devices sold), the platform never had significant market share in the key U.S. market, and Microsoft was unable to maintain Windows Phone's momentum in the years that followed, resulting in dwindling interest from users and app developers. After Balmer was succeeded by Satya Nadella (who has placed a larger focus on software and cloud computing) as CEO of Microsoft, it took a $7.6 billion write-off on the Nokia assets in July 2015, and laid off nearly the entire Microsoft Mobile unit in May 2016.

Prior to the completion of the sale to Microsoft, Nokia released a series of Android-derived smartphones for emerging markets known as Nokia X, which combined an Android-based platform with elements of Windows Phone and Nokia's feature phone platform Asha, using Microsoft and Nokia services rather than Google.

=== Camera advancements ===
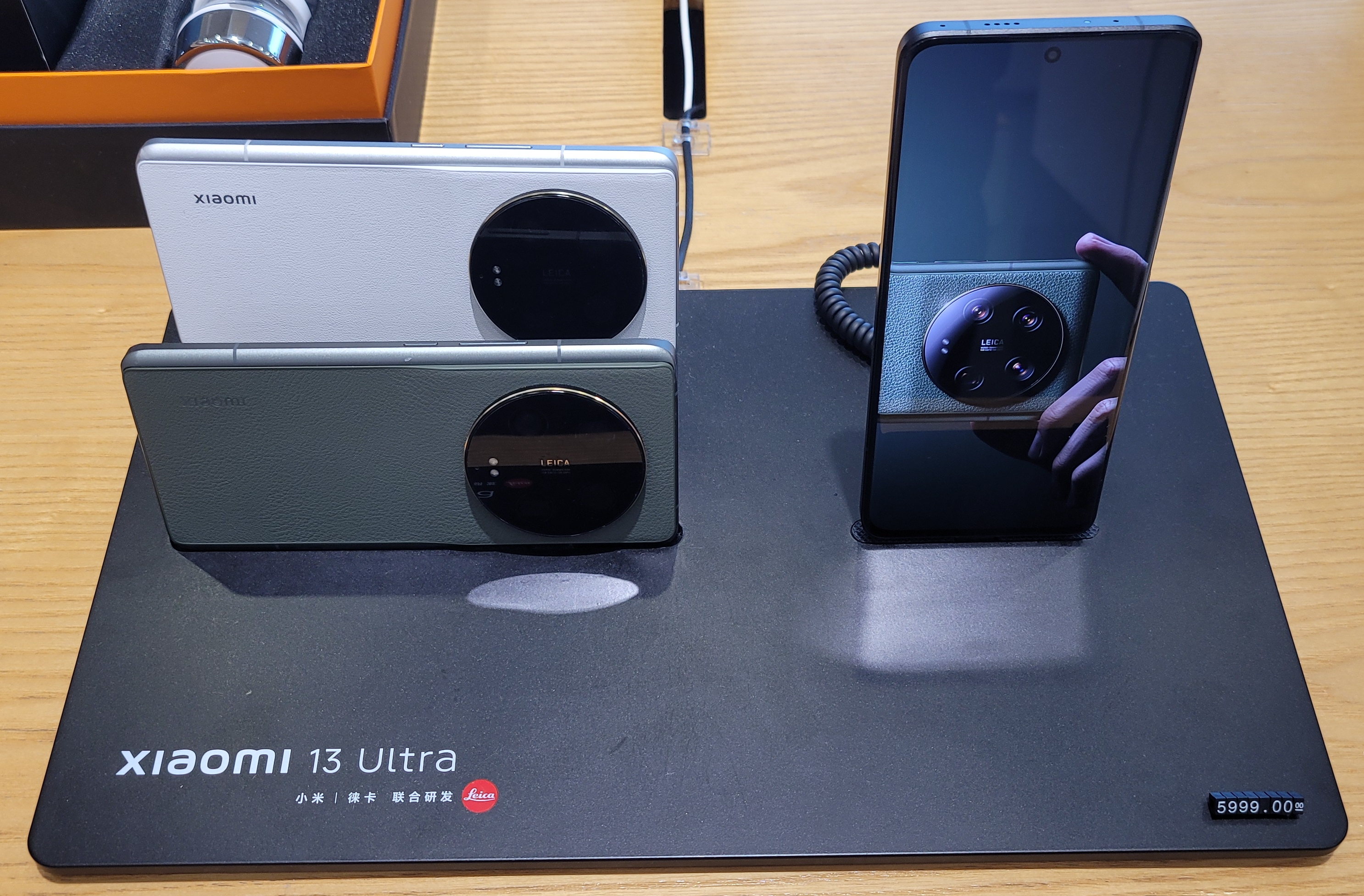
Xiaomi 13 Ultra featured a Leica Summicron camera system.

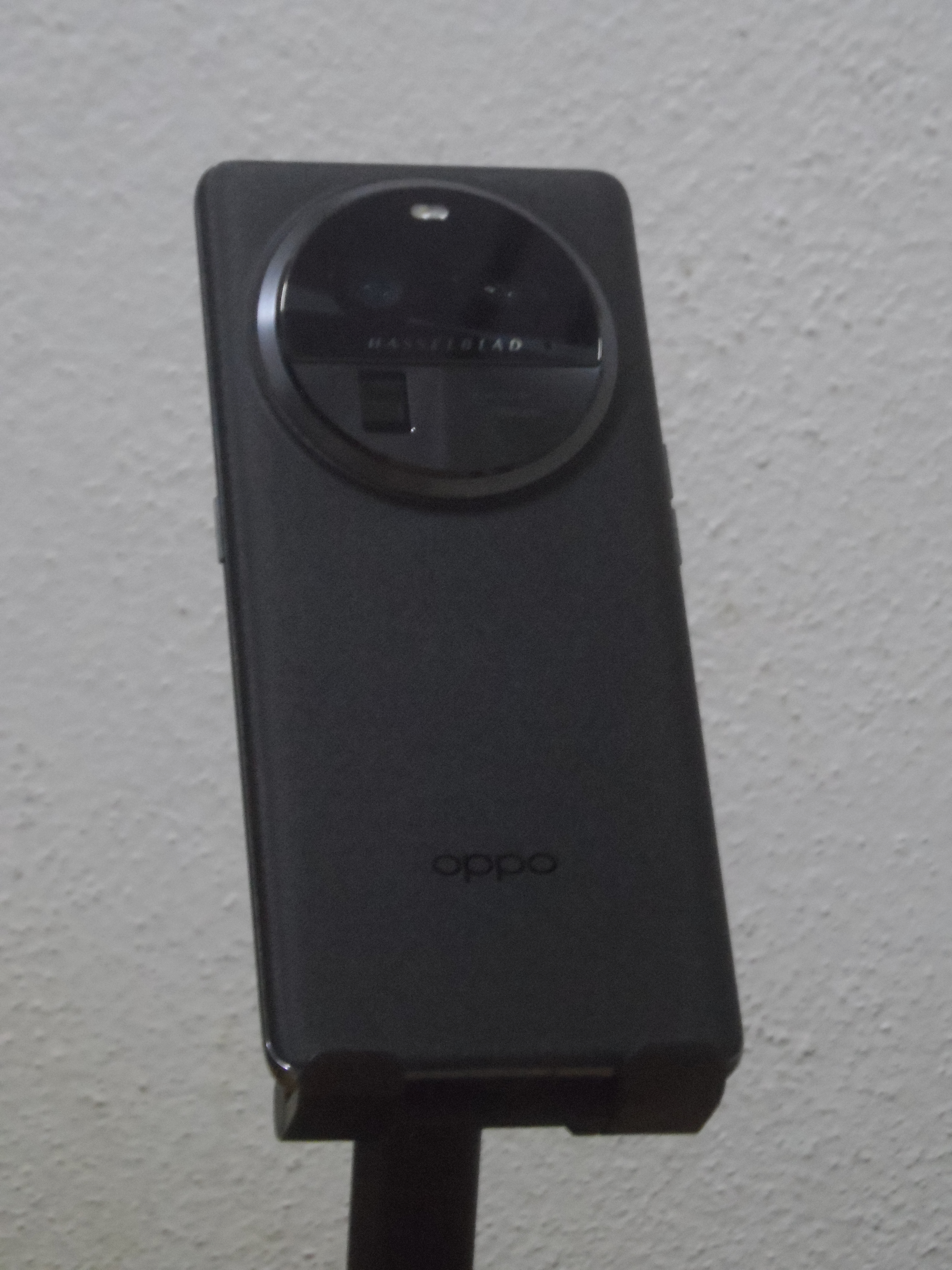
Oppo Find X6 features software-based tuning co-developed with Hasselblad.

The first commercial camera phone was the Kyocera Visual Phone VP-210, released in Japan in May 1999. It was called a "mobile videophone" at the time, and had a 110,000-pixel front-facing camera. It could send up to two images per second over Japan's Personal Handy-phone System (PHS) cellular network, and store up to 20 JPEG digital images, which could be sent over e-mail. The first mass-market camera phone was the J-SH04, a Sharp J-Phone model sold in Japan in November 2000. It could instantly transmit pictures via cell phone telecommunication.

By the mid-2000s, higher-end cell phones commonly had integrated digital cameras. In 2003 camera phones outsold stand-alone digital cameras, and in 2006 they outsold film and digital stand-alone cameras. Five billion camera phones were sold in five years, and by 2007 more than half of the installed base of all mobile phones were camera phones. Sales of separate cameras peaked in 2008.

Many early smartphones did not have cameras at all, and earlier models that had them had low performance and insufficient image and video quality that could not compete with budget pocket cameras and fulfill user's needs. By the beginning of the 2010s almost all smartphones had an integrated digital camera. The decline in sales of stand-alone cameras accelerated due to the increasing use of smartphones with rapidly improving camera technology for casual photography, easier image manipulation, and abilities to directly share photos through the use of apps and web-based services. By 2011, cell phones with integrated cameras were selling hundreds of millions per year. In 2015, digital camera sales were 35.395 million units or only less than a third of digital camera sales numbers at their peak and also slightly less than film camera sold number at their peak.

Contributing to the rise in popularity of smartphones being used over dedicated cameras for photography, smaller pocket cameras have difficulty producing bokeh in images, but nowadays, some smartphones have dual-lens cameras that reproduce the bokeh effect easily, and can even rearrange the level of bokeh after shooting. This works by capturing multiple images with different focus settings, then combining the background of the main image with a macro focus shot.

In 2007, the Nokia N95 was notable as a smartphone that had a 5.0 Megapixel (MP) camera, when most others had cameras with around 3 MP or less than 2 MP. Some specialized feature phones like the LG Viewty, Samsung SGH-G800, and Sony Ericsson K850i, all released later that year, also had 5.0 MP cameras. By 2010, 5.0 MP cameras were common; a few smartphones had 8.0 MP cameras and the Nokia N8, Sony Ericsson Satio, and Samsung M8910 Pixon12 feature phone had 12 MP. The main camera of the 2009 Nokia N86 uniquely features a three-level aperture lens.

The Altek Leo, a 14-megapixel smartphone with 3x optical zoom lens and 720p HD video camera was released in late 2010.

In 2011, the same year the Nintendo 3DS was released, HTC unveiled the Evo 3D, a 3D phone with a dual five-megapixel rear camera setup for spatial imaging, among the earliest mobile phones with more than one rear camera.

The 2012 Samsung Galaxy S3 introduced the ability to capture photos using voice commands.

In 2012, Nokia announced and released the Nokia 808 PureView, featuring a 41-megapixel 1/1.2-inch sensor and a high-resolution f/2.4 Zeiss all-aspherical one-group lens. The high resolution enables four times of lossless digital zoom at 1080p and six times at 720p resolution, using image sensor cropping. The 2013 Nokia Lumia 1020 has a similar high-resolution camera setup, with the addition of optical image stabilization and manual camera settings years before common among high-end mobile phones, although lacking expandable storage that could be of use for accordingly high file sizes.

Mobile optical image stabilization was first introduced by Nokia in 2012 with the Lumia 920, and the earliest known smartphone with an optically stabilized front camera is the HTC 10 from 2016. Optical image stabilization enables prolonged exposure times for low-light photography and smoothing out handheld video shaking, since the appearance of shakes magnifies over a larger display such as a monitor or television set, which would be detrimental to the watching experience.

Since 2012, smartphones have become increasingly able to capture photos while filming. The resolution of those photos resolution may vary between devices. Samsung has used the highest image sensor resolution at the video's aspect ratio, which at 16:9 is 6 Megapixels (3264 × 1836) on the Galaxy S3 and 9.6 Megapixels (4128 × 2322) on the Galaxy S4. The earliest iPhones with such functionality, iPhone 5 and 5s, captured simultaneous photos at 0.9 Megapixels (1280 × 720) while filming.

Starting in 2013 on the Xperia Z1, Sony experimented with real-time augmented reality camera effects such as floating text, virtual plants, volcano, and a dinosaur walking in the scenery. Apple later did similarly in 2017 with the iPhone X.

In the same year, iOS 7 introduced the later widely implemented viewfinder intuition, where exposure value can be adjusted through vertical swiping, after focus and exposure has been set by tapping, and even while locked after holding down for a brief moment. On some devices, this intuition may be restricted by software in video/slow motion modes and for front camera.

In 2013, Samsung unveiled the Galaxy S4 Zoom smartphone with the grip shape of a compact camera and a 10× optical zoom lens, as well as a rotary knob ring around the lens, as used on higher-end compact cameras, and an ISO 1222 tripod mount. It is equipped with manual parameter settings, including for focus and exposure. The successor 2014 Samsung Galaxy K Zoom brought resolution and performance enhancements, but lacks the rotary knob and tripod mount to allow for a more smartphone-like shape with less protruding lens.

The 2014 Panasonic Lumix DMC-CM1 was another attempt at mixing mobile phone with compact camera, so much so that it inherited the Lumix brand. While lacking optical zoom, its image sensor has a format of 1", as used in high-end compact cameras such as the Lumix DMC-LX100 and Sony CyberShot DSC-RX100 series, with multiple times the surface size of a typical mobile camera image sensor, as well as support for light sensitivities of up to ISO 25600, well beyond the typical mobile camera light sensitivity range. As of 2021, no successor has been released.

In 2013 and 2014, HTC experimentally traded in pixel count for pixel surface size on their One M7 and M8, both with only four megapixels, marketed as UltraPixel, citing improved brightness and less noise in low light, though the more recent One M8 lacks optical image stabilization.

The One M8 additionally was one of the earliest smartphones to be equipped with a dual camera setup. Its software allows generating visual spatial effects such as 3D panning, weather effects, and focus adjustment ("UFocus"), simulating the postphotographic selective focusing capability of images produced by a light-field camera. HTC returned to a high-megapixel single-camera setup on the 2015 One M9.

Meanwhile, in 2014, LG Mobile started experimenting with time-of-flight camera functionality, where a rear laser beam that measures distance accelerates autofocus.

Phase-detection autofocus was increasingly adapted throughout the mid-2010s, allowing for quicker and more accurate focusing than contrast detection.

In 2016, Apple introduced the iPhone 7 Plus, one of the phones to popularize a dual camera setup. The iPhone 7 Plus included a main 12 MP camera along with a 12 MP telephoto camera. In early 2018 Huawei released a new flagship phone, the Huawei P20 Pro, one of the first triple camera lens setups with Leica optics. In late 2018, Samsung released a new mid-range smartphone, the Galaxy A9 (2018) with the world's first quad camera setup. The Nokia 9 PureView was released in 2019 featuring a penta-lens camera system.

2019 saw the commercialization of high resolution sensors, which use pixel binning to capture more light. 48 MP and 64 MP sensors developed by Sony and Samsung are commonly used by several manufacturers. 108 MP sensors were first implemented in late 2019 and early 2020.

==== Video resolution ====
Timeline (rear camera)
| Resolution | First year |
|---|---|
| 720p (HD) | 2009 |
| 720p at 60fps | 2012 |
| 1080p (Full HD) | 2011 |
| 1080p at 60fps | 2013 |
| 2160p (4K) | 2013 |
| 2160p at 60fps | 2017 |
| 4320p (8K) | 2020 |

With better-performing chipsets to handle computing workload demands at higher pixel rates, mobile video resolution and framerate has caught up with dedicated consumer-grade cameras over years.

In 2009, the Samsung Omnia HD became the first mobile phone with 720p HD video recording. In the same year, Apple brought video recording initially to the iPhone 3GS, at 480p, whereas the 2007 original iPhone and 2008 iPhone 3G lacked video recording entirely.

720p was more widely adapted in 2010, on smartphones such as the original Samsung Galaxy S, Sony Ericsson Xperia X10, iPhone 4, and HTC Desire HD.

The early 2010s brought a steep increase in mobile video resolution. 1080p mobile video recording was achieved in 2011 on the Samsung Galaxy S2, HTC Sensation, and iPhone 4s.

In 2012 and 2013, select devices with 720p filming at 60 frames per second were released: the Asus PadFone 2 and HTC One M7, unlike flagships of Samsung, Sony, and Apple. However, the 2013 Samsung Galaxy S4 Zoom does support it.

In 2013, the Samsung Galaxy Note 3 introduced 2160p (4K) video recording at 30 frames per second, as well as 1080p doubled to 60 frames per second for smoothness.

Other vendors adapted 2160p recording in 2014, including the optically stabilized LG G3. Apple first implemented it in late 2015 on the iPhone 6s and 6s Plus.

The framerate at 2160p was widely doubled to 60 in 2017 and 2018, starting with the iPhone 8, Galaxy S9, LG G7, and OnePlus 6.

Sufficient computing performance of chipsets and image sensor resolution and its reading speeds have enabled mobile 4320p (8K) filming in 2020, introduced with the Samsung Galaxy S20 and Redmi K30 Pro, though some upper resolution levels were foregone (skipped) throughout development, including 1440p (2.5K), 2880p (5K), and 3240p (6K), except 1440p on Samsung Galaxy front cameras.

Mid-class

Among mid-range smartphone series, the introduction of higher video resolutions was initially delayed by two to three years compared to flagship counterparts. 720p was widely adapted in 2012, including with the Samsung Galaxy S3 Mini, Sony Xperia go, and 1080p in 2013 on the Samsung Galaxy S4 Mini and HTC One mini.

The proliferation of video resolutions beyond 1080p has been postponed by several years. The mid-class Sony Xperia M5 supported 2160p filming in 2016, whereas Samsung's mid-class series such as the Galaxy J and A series were strictly limited to 1080p in resolution and 30 frames per second at any resolution for six years until around 2019, whether and how much for technical reasons is unclear.

Setting

A lower video resolution setting may be desirable to extend recording time by reducing space storage and power consumption.

The camera software of some smartphones is equipped with separate controls for resolution, frame rate, and bit rate. An example of a smartphone with these controls is the LG V10.

==== Slow motion video ====
A distinction between different camera software is the method used to store high frame rate video footage, with more recent phones (Note: For example, Samsung starting with the Galaxy S6) retaining both the image sensor's original output frame rate and audio, while earlier phones do not record audio and stretch the video so it can be played back slowly at default speed.

While the stretched encoding method used on earlier phones enables slow motion playback on video player software that lacks manual playback speed control, typically found on older devices, if the aim were to achieve a slow motion effect, the real-time method used by more recent phones offers greater versatility for video editing, where slowed down portions of the footage can be freely selected by the user, and exported into a separate video. A rudimentary video editing software for this purpose is usually pre-installed. The video can optionally be played back at normal (real-time) speed, acting as usual video.

Development

The earliest smartphone known to feature a slow motion mode is the 2009 Samsung i8000 Omnia II, which can record at QVGA (320×240) at 120 fps (frames per second). Slow motion is not available on the Galaxy S1, Galaxy S2, Galaxy Note 1, and Galaxy S3 flagships.

In early 2012, the HTC One X allowed 768×432 pixel slow motion filming at an undocumented frame rate. The output footage has been measured as a third of real-time speed.

In late 2012, the Galaxy Note 2 brought back slow motion, with D1 (720 × 480) at 120 fps. In early 2013, the Galaxy S4 and HTC One M7 recorded at that frame rate with 800 × 450, followed by the Note 3 and iPhone 5s with 720p (1280 × 720) in late 2013, the latter of which retaines audio and original sensor frame rate, as with all later iPhones. In early 2014, the Sony Xperia Z2 and HTC One M8 adapted this resolution as well. In late 2014, the iPhone 6 doubled the frame rate to 240 fps, and in late 2015, the iPhone 6s added support for 1080p (1920 × 1080) at 120 frames per second. In early 2015, the Galaxy S6 became the first Samsung mobile phone to retain the sensor framerate and audio, and in early 2016, the Galaxy S7 became the first Samsung mobile phone with 240 fps recording, also at 720p.

In early 2015, the MT6795 chipset by MediaTek promised 1080p@480 fps video recording. The project's status remains indefinite.

Since early 2017, starting with the Sony Xperia XZ, smartphones have been released with a slow motion mode that unsustainably records at framerates multiple times as high, by temporarily storing frames on the image sensor's internal burst memory. Such a recording lasts a few real-time seconds at most.

In late 2017, the iPhone 8 brought 1080p at 240 fps, as well as 2160p at 60 fps, followed by the Galaxy S9 in early 2018. In mid-2018, the OnePlus 6 brought 720p at 480 fps, sustainable for one minute.

In early 2021, the OnePlus 9 Pro became the first phone with 2160p at 120 fps.

==== HDR video ====
The first smartphones to record HDR video were the early 2013 Sony Xperia Z and mid-2013 Xperia Z Ultra, followed by the early 2014 Galaxy S5, all at 1080p.

==== Audio recording ====
Mobile phones with multiple microphones usually allow video recording with stereo audio for spaciality, with Samsung, Sony, and HTC initially implementing it in 2012 on their Samsung Galaxy S3, Sony Xperia S, and HTC One X. Apple implemented stereo audio starting with the 2018 iPhone Xs family and iPhone XR.

==== Front cameras ====
===== Photo =====
Emphasis is being put on the front camera since the mid-2010s, where front cameras have reached resolutions as high as typical rear cameras, such as the 2015 LG G4 (8 megapixels), Sony Xperia C5 Ultra (13 megapixels), and 2016 Sony Xperia XA Ultra (16 megapixels, optically stabilized). The 2015 LG V10 brought a dual front camera system where the second has a wider angle for group photography. Samsung implemented a front-camera sweep panorama (panorama selfie) feature since the Galaxy Note 4 to extend the field of view.

===== Video =====
In 2012, the Galaxy S3 and iPhone 5 brought 720p HD front video recording (at 30 fps). In early 2013, the Samsung Galaxy S4, HTC One M7 and Sony Xperia Z brought 1080p Full HD at that framerate, and in late 2014, the Galaxy Note 4 introduced 1440p video recording on the front camera. Apple adapted 1080p front camera video with the late 2016 iPhone 7.

In 2019, smartphones started adapting 2160p 4K video recording on the front camera, six years after rear camera 2160p commenced with the Galaxy Note 3.

=== Display advancements ===
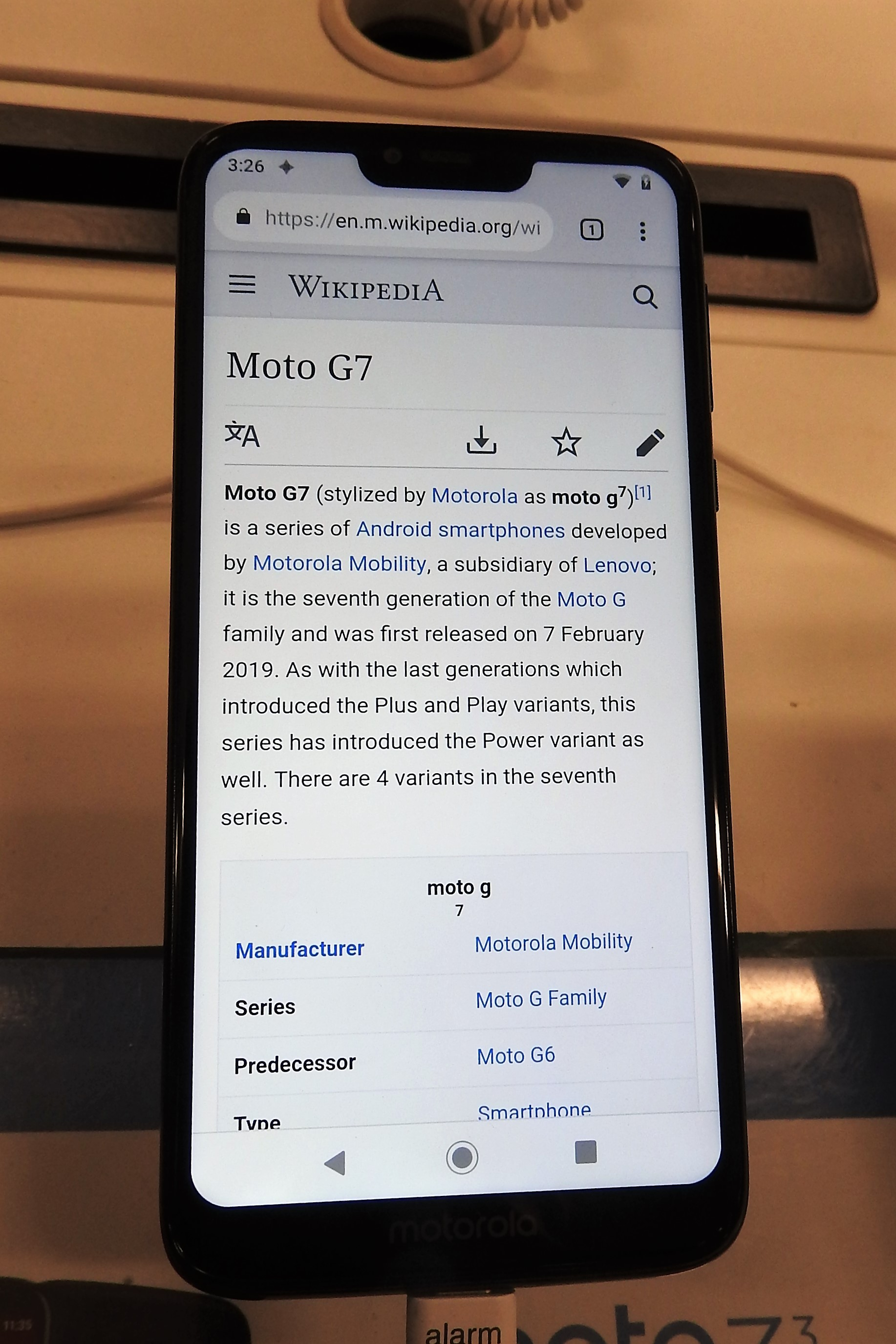
A Moto G7 Power; its display uses a tall aspect ratio and includes a "notch".

In the early 2010s, larger smartphones with screen sizes of at least 140 millimetres (5.5 in) diagonal, dubbed "phablets", began to achieve popularity, with the 2011 Samsung Galaxy Note series gaining notably wide adoption. In 2013, Huawei launched the Huawei Mate series, sporting a 155 millimetres (6.1 in) HD (1280 x 720) IPS+ LCD display, which was considered to be quite large at the time.

Some companies began to release smartphones in 2013 incorporating flexible displays to create curved form factors, such as the Samsung Galaxy Round and LG G Flex.

By 2014, 1440p displays began to appear on high-end smartphones. In 2015, Sony released the Xperia Z5 Premium, featuring a 4K resolution display, although only images and videos could actually be rendered at that resolution (all other software was shown at 1080p).

New trends for smartphone displays began to emerge in 2017, with both LG and Samsung releasing flagship smartphones (LG G6 and Galaxy S8), utilizing displays with taller aspect ratios than the common 16:9 ratio, and a high screen-to-body ratio, also known as a "bezel-less design". These designs allow the display to have a larger diagonal measurement, but with a slimmer width than 16:9 displays with an equivalent screen size. Another trend popularized in 2017 were displays containing tab-like cut-outs at the top-centre—colloquially known as a "notch"—to contain the front-facing camera, and sometimes other sensors typically located along the top bezel of a device. These designs allow for "edge-to-edge" displays that take up nearly the entire height of the device, with little to no bezel along the top, and sometimes a minimal bottom bezel as well. This design characteristic appeared almost simultaneously on the Sharp Aquos S2 and the Essential Phone, which featured small circular tabs for their cameras, followed just a month later by the iPhone X, which used a wider tab to contain a camera and facial scanning system known as Face ID. The 2016 LG V10 had a precursor to the concept, with a portion of the screen wrapped around the camera area in the top-left corner, and the resulting area marketed as a "second" display that could be used for various supplemental features.

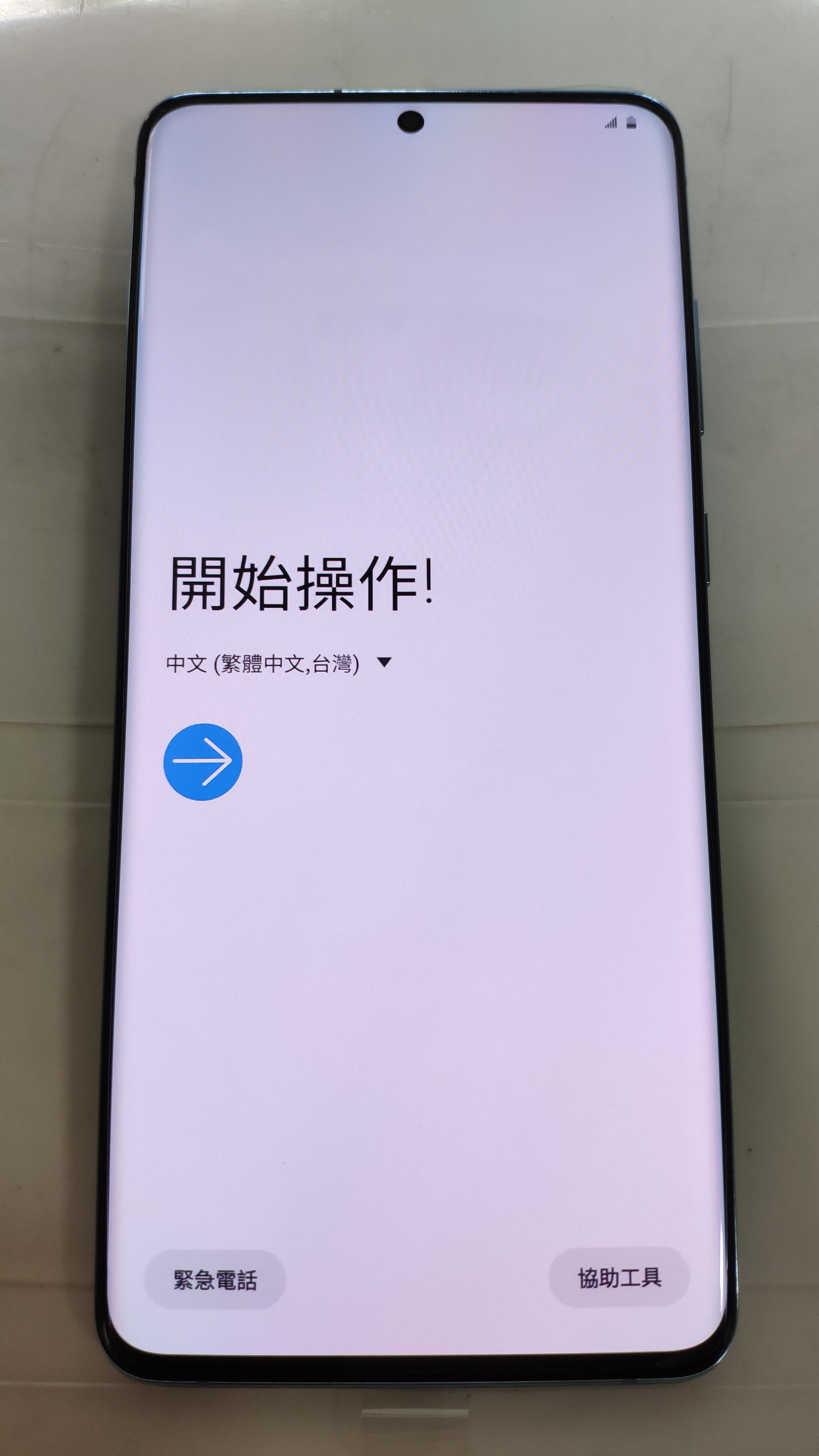
A Samsung Galaxy S20 Plus, featuring a "hole-punch" camera

Other variations of the practice later emerged, such as a "hole-punch" camera (such as those of the Honor View 20, and Samsung's Galaxy A8s and Galaxy S10)—eschewing the tabbed "notch" for a circular or rounded-rectangular cut-out within the screen instead, while Oppo released the first "all-screen" phones with no notches at all, including one with a mechanical front camera that pops up from the top of the device (Find X), and a 2019 prototype for a front-facing camera that can be embedded and hidden below the display, using a special partially-translucent screen structure that allows light to reach the image sensor below the panel. The first implementation was the ZTE Axon 20 5G, with a 32 MP sensor manufactured by Visionox.

Displays supporting refresh rates higher than 60 Hz (such as 90 Hz or 120 Hz) also began to appear on smartphones in 2017; initially confined to "gaming" smartphones such as the Razer Phone (2017) and Asus ROG Phone (2018), they later became more common on flagship phones such as the Pixel 4 (2019) and Samsung Galaxy S21 series (2021). Higher refresh rates allow for smoother motion and lower input latency, but often at the cost of battery life. As such, the device may offer a means to disable high refresh rates, or be configured to automatically reduce the refresh rate when there is low on-screen motion.

==== Multi-tasking ====
An early implementation of multiple simultaneous tasks on a smartphone display are the picture-in-picture video playback mode ("pop-up play") and "live video list" with playing video thumbnails of the 2012 Samsung Galaxy S3, the former of which was later delivered to the 2011 Samsung Galaxy Note through a software update. Later that year, a split-screen mode was implemented on the Galaxy Note 2, later retrofitted on the Galaxy S3 through the "premium suite upgrade".

The earliest implementation of desktop and laptop-like windowing was on the 2013 Samsung Galaxy Note 3.

=== Foldable smartphones ===
Smartphones utilizing flexible displays were theorized as possible once manufacturing costs and production processes were feasible. In November 2018, the startup company Royole unveiled the first commercially available foldable smartphone, the Royole FlexPai. Also that month, Samsung presented a prototype phone featuring an "Infinity Flex Display" at its developers conference, with a smaller, outer display on its "cover", and a larger, tablet-sized display when opened. Samsung stated that it also had to develop a new polymer material to coat the display as opposed to glass. Samsung officially announced the Galaxy Fold, based on the previously demonstrated prototype, in February 2019 for an originally scheduled release in late-April. Due to various durability issues with the display and hinge systems encountered by early reviewers, the release of the Galaxy Fold was delayed to September to allow for design changes.

In November 2019, Motorola unveiled a variation of the concept with its re-imagining of the Razr, using a horizontally-folding display to create a clamshell form factor inspired by its previous feature phone range of the same name. Samsung would unveil a similar device known as the Galaxy Z Flip the following February.

=== Other developments in the 2010s ===
The first smartphone with a fingerprint reader was the Motorola Atrix 4G in 2011. In September 2013, the iPhone 5S was unveiled as the first smartphone on a major U.S. carrier since the Atrix to feature this technology. Once again, the iPhone popularized this concept. One of the barriers of fingerprint reading amongst consumers was security concerns, however Apple was able to address these concerns by encrypting this fingerprint data onto the A7 Processor located inside the phone as well as make sure this information could not be accessed by third-party applications and is not stored in iCloud or Apple servers

In 2012, Samsung introduced the Galaxy S3 (GT-i9300) with retrofittable wireless charging, pop-up video playback, 4G-LTE variant (GT-i9305) quad-core processor.

In 2013, Fairphone launched its first "socially ethical" smartphone at the London Design Festival to address concerns regarding the sourcing of materials in the manufacturing followed by Shiftphone in 2015. In late 2013, QSAlpha commenced production of a smartphone designed entirely around security, encryption and identity protection.

In October 2013, Motorola Mobility announced Project Ara, a concept for a modular smartphone platform that would allow users to customize and upgrade their phones with add-on modules that attached magnetically to a frame. Ara was retained by Google following its sale of Motorola Mobility to Lenovo, but was shelved in 2016. That year, LG and Motorola both unveiled smartphones featuring a limited form of modularity for accessories; the LG G5 allowed accessories to be installed via the removal of its battery compartment, while the Moto Z utilizes accessories attached magnetically to the rear of the device.

Microsoft, expanding upon the concept of Motorola's short-lived "Webtop", unveiled functionality for its Windows 10 operating system for phones that allows supported devices to be docked for use with a PC-styled desktop environment.

Samsung and LG used to be the "last standing" manufacturers to offer flagship devices with user-replaceable batteries. But in 2015, Samsung succumbed to the minimalism trend set by Apple, introducing the Galaxy S6 without a user-replaceable battery. In addition, Samsung was criticised for pruning long-standing features such as MHL, MicroUSB 3.0, water resistance and MicroSD card support, of which the latter two came back in 2016 with the Galaxy S7 and S7 Edge.

As of 2015, the global median for smartphone ownership was 43%. Statista forecast that 2.87 billion people would own smartphones in 2020.

Within the same decade, rapid deployment of LTE cellular network and general availability of smartphones have increased popularity of the streaming television services, and the corresponding mobile TV apps.

Major technologies that began to trend in 2016 included a focus on virtual reality and augmented reality experiences catered towards smartphones, the newly introduced USB-C connector, and improving LTE technologies.

In 2016, adjustable screen resolution known from desktop operating systems was introduced to smartphones for power saving, whereas variable screen refresh rates were popularized in 2020. In 2016, smartphone sales declined for the first time.

In 2018, the first smartphones featuring fingerprint readers embedded within OLED displays were announced, followed in 2019 by an implementation using an ultrasonic sensor on the Samsung Galaxy S10.

In 2019, the majority of smartphones released have more than one camera, are waterproof with IP67 and IP68 ratings, and unlock using facial recognition or fingerprint scanners.

This layout of the camera viewfinder was first introduced by Apple with iOS 7 in 2013. Towards the late 2010s, several other smartphone vendors have ditched their layouts and implemented variations of this layout.

Designs first implemented by Apple have been replicated by other vendors several times. These include a sealed body that does not allow replacing the battery, a lack of the physical audio connector (since the iPhone 7 from 2016), a screen with a cut-out area at the top for the earphone and front-facing camera and sensors (colloquially known as "notch"; since the iPhone X from 2017), the exclusion of a charging wall adapter from the scope of delivery (since the iPhone 12 from 2020), and a camera user interface with circular and usually solid-colour shutter button and a camera mode selector using perpendicular text and separate camera modes for photo and video (since iOS 7 from 2013). (Note: c. f. camera software of Samsung since the Galaxy S10, of Huawei since the P20, of LG since the G8, since the OnePlus 6, of Xiaomi since Redmi Note 5, and of UleFone smartphones released since at least 2017 (as of 2022).)

== Smartphones in the 2020s ==
In 2020, the first smartphones featuring high-speed 5G network capability were announced.

Since 2020, smartphones have decreasingly been shipped with rudimentary accessories like a power adapter and headphones that have historically been almost invariably within the scope of delivery. This trend was initiated with Apple's iPhone 12, followed by Samsung and Xiaomi on the Galaxy S21 and Mi 11 respectively, months after having mocked the same through advertisements. The reason cited is reducing environmental footprint, though reaching raised charging rates supported by newer models demands a new charger shipped through separate packaging with its own environmental footprint.

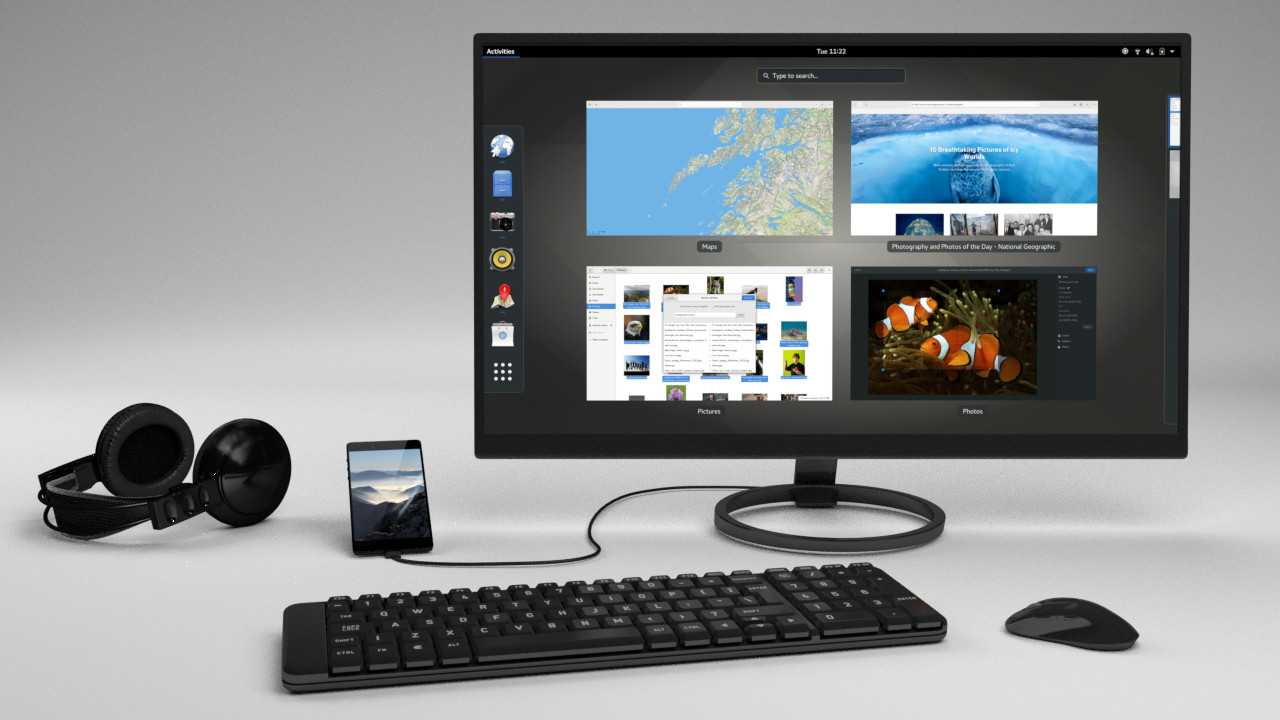
Mobile/desktop convergence: the Librem 5 smartphone can be used as a basic desktop computer

With the development of the PinePhone and Librem 5 in the 2020s, there are intensified efforts to make open source GNU/Linux for smartphones a major alternative to iOS and Android. Moreover, associated software enabled convergence (beyond convergent and hybrid apps) by allowing the smartphones to be used like a desktop computer when connected to a keyboard, mouse and monitor.

In the early 2020s, manufacturers began to integrate satellite connectivity into smartphone devices for use in remote areas, where local terrestrial communication infrastructures, such as landline and cellular networks, are not available. Due to the antenna limitations in the conventional phones, in the early stages of implementation satellite connectivity would be limited to the satellite messaging and satellite emergency services.

In addition to these advancements in connectivity, the mid-2020s marked the onset of a new era in the industry with the introduction of AI phones. The operating system (OS) and hardware of these phones were equipped with generative AI. Cloud-based processing is a significant component of conventional voice assistants. AI phones and other on-device AI devices do not. Instead, complex AI tasks are processed on-device through high-performance NPUs. In January 2024, Samsung Electronics launched Galaxy AI with the Samsung Galaxy S24 series. This system is designed to facilitate functions such as language translation and image editing by using the phone's own processing power and cloud. Later that year, Apple Inc. announced Apple Intelligence, a set of models that work together across its software.

== See also ==
- Post-PC era
