= Post-PC era =

Market trend

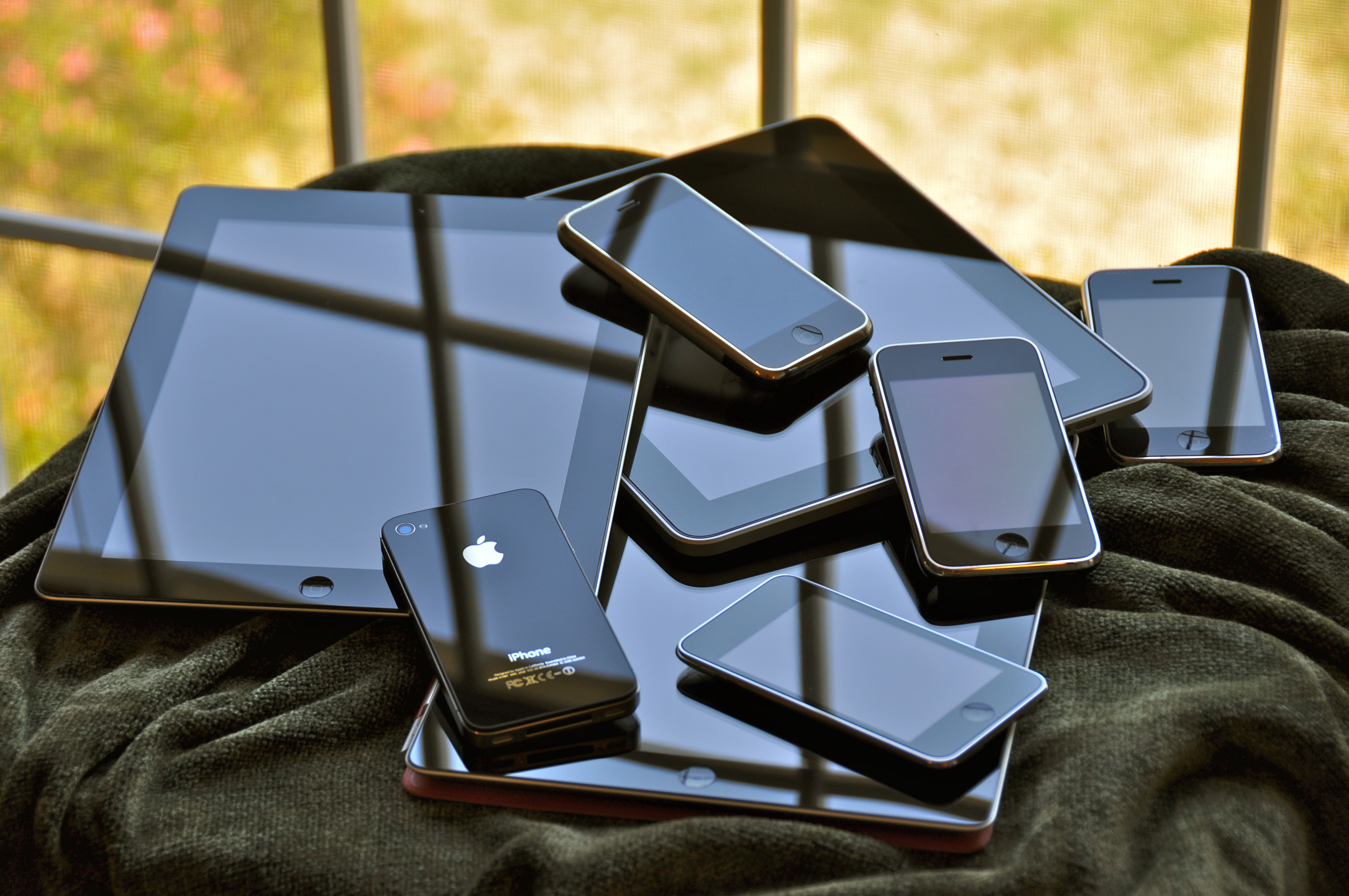
A collection of mobile devices, including various iPhone, iPad, and iPod Touch models; all of which are considered to be examples of "post-PC" devices.

The post-PC era was a market trend observed during the 2010s involving a decline in the sales of traditional personal computers (PCs) like desktops and laptops in favor of mobile devices like smartphones, tablets and wearables. These devices emphasize portability and connectivity, including the use of cloud-based services, more focused "apps" to perform tasks, and the ability to synchronize information between multiple devices seamlessly.

The term was coined by MIT scientist David D. Clark. While both Microsoft's and Apple's former CEOs Bill Gates and Steve Jobs also predicted a shift towards mobile devices as the primary method of computing, as a complement to the PC, Jobs popularized the term "post-PC" in 2007 (the launch of the first iPhone), and in 2011 launched iCloud, a service enabling Apple's product line to synchronize data with PCs through cloud services, freeing their iOS devices from dependency on a PC.

Towards the middle of the 2010s, media sources began to question the existence of the post-PC era, at least as conventionally defined, stating that the so-called "post-PC" devices are just other portable forms of PCs joining traditional desktop PCs which still have their own operation areas and evolve. For example, gaming PCs are still considered popular by many users.

== History ==
The term "post PC" was first used by David D. Clark in 1999; considering the future of computing to be "inevitably heterogeneous" and a "network full of services". Clark described a world where "everything" would be able to connect to the internet (including watches and toasters), computing would primarily be done through information appliances, and data would be stored by centralized hosting services instead of on physical disks.

In a 1999 op-ed piece for Newsweek, Microsoft's CEO Bill Gates predicted a landscape he dubbed "PC Plus", where personal computers would be used alongside devices that would seamlessly synchronize data (such as calendar events, files, e-mails, etc.) from a PC for easier accessibility from where a user would need it. At Macworld Expo in 2001, not long after the dot-com bubble burst and amidst industry-wide angst over the future of the PC, Apple founder and CEO Steve Jobs announced a strategy seeing a PC (specifically, the Macintosh) serving as a "digital hub" for future mobile devices (such as its iPod MP3 player). Jobs stated that "We don't think the PC is dying at all. We don't think the PC is moving from the center at all. We think it's evolving. Just like it has since it was invented in 1975 and '76."

At an interview alongside Bill Gates at the 5th All Things Digital conference in 2007, Steve Jobs further described a concept similar to Gates' "PC Plus" known as a "post-PC device"; "a category of devices that aren't as general purpose, that are really more focused on specific functions, whether they're phones or iPods or Zunes or what have you. And I think that category of devices is going to continue to be very innovative and we're going to see lots of them". Jobs felt that despite these developments, PCs would "continue to be with us and morph with us, whether it's a tablet or a notebook or, you know, a big curved desktop that you have at your house or whatever it might be." Gates suggested the prevalence of multiple form factors for such devices, including full-sized tablets, small phones, and 10-foot experiences for the living room.

In June 2010, at the D8 conference, while being interviewed by Walt Mossberg and Kara Swisher, Jobs compared tablets and PCs to cars and trucks, saying "[PCs are] still going to be around. They're still going to have a lot of value. But they're going to be used by like one out of x people" while predicting that the vast majority of people will eventually use tablets as a primary computing device, analogous to the majority of people who drive cars. Directly conflicting Apple's previous "digital hub" strategy centered around the Macintosh PC, Steve Jobs unveiled Apple's iCloud platform in 2011, which provides cloud storage for data that can be automatically synced between iOS products and PCs. iOS 5, released concurrently with iCloud, also removed the platform's dependency on a PC for first-time setup, syncing, and software updates. Jobs explained that iCloud would replace the PC as the "hub" for a user's devices with online servers—all of a user's devices, including a PC, would be able to automatically synchronize and access media and other files between platforms. Apple's current CEO Tim Cook continued to elaborate on the concept that a PC would no longer have to be the center of one's digital life, considering them to be a "device" on the same level as any portable device that a particular user owns. Cook also explained that mobile devices such as tablets and smartphones would be "more portable, more personal and dramatically easier to use than any PC has ever been".

Technologically, Jason Perlow compared post-PC devices to the centralized mainframe-based computer systems of 1970s—but enhanced by the use of cloud computing to provide a more flexible and heterogeneous infrastructure for online services to run on, and the use of desktop virtualization to serve PC-only applications when needed as businesses shift towards apps. Matt Baxter-Reynolds felt that the main selling point of post-PC devices are their lack of functionality; believing that their more simplistic and secure design make them less intimidating to use for consumers in comparison to a traditional PC, their lack of keyboard (unlike laptops) contribute to better portability, and also noted their emphasis on connectivity as well.

In 2014, Sony had sold off its PC division and Vaio brand. This, along with a drop in sales, led many to speculate the PC market was dying. However, the PC market did experience some periods of growth in the 2010s as well, leading many to claim the exact opposite. PC gaming grew 8% in 2012 alone and is expected to continue growing. In the second quarter of 2014, PC sales began to rise again. Growth of the PC compatible market was driven by strong sales of portable PCs in 2014.

=== Proponents ===
During an event that unveiled the 3rd generation iPad, Tim Cook reported that Apple had sold 172 million iPod, iPhone, and iPad products in 2011 alone (totaling 76% of the company's total revenue), and had sold more iPad tablets during the fourth quarter of 2011 than personal computers were sold worldwide. Likewise in the third quarter of 2012, worldwide PC sales dropped by 8.6% in comparison to 2011, and in July 2013, Gartner reported that the number of worldwide PC shipments had fallen for the fifth quarter in a row, marking the longest decline in the history of the PC industry. The threat of post-PC devices have also affected the producers of the x86 processors typically used by PCs; many smartphones and tablets use low-power ARM processors manufactured by companies such as Nvidia and Qualcomm instead of the x86 processors sold by companies such as Intel and AMD. The decline in PC sales has directly affected the sales of their processors; while Intel continued to gain market share over AMD in the third quarter of 2012, worldwide shipments of processors also declined by 9% in comparison to the third quarter of 2011.

Several sources, including The Economist, have identified Amazon, Apple, Google and Microsoft as the four platform cloud companies which will be the key competitors in the post-PC era of mobile computing. Tech companies with a heavy dependency on PC sales such as Hewlett-Packard and Dell have seen decreased profits, while IBM has also struggled due to slowing demand for hardware and consulting services.

=== Detractors ===
Despite the decrease in PC sales, desktop computers and laptops still made up 84% of the global Web traffic as of March 2013. At its Worldwide Partner Conference in 2012, Microsoft's COO Kevin Turner attacked Tim Cook's declaration of a post-PC era for being "completely incorrect", and described its then-upcoming Windows 8 operating system as a "game-changer" for Bill Gates' "PC plus" landscape. Unlike Apple, whose mobile and PC devices both use different operating systems (iOS and OS X), Windows 8 was designed to accommodate both traditional PCs and tablets through its use of an updated interface optimized for touchscreen use, and its introduction of Windows Store, a service similar to the App Store for obtaining touch-optimized software. As a complement, Microsoft also introduced Windows RT, a special stripped down variant of the operating system built for devices that use the ARM architecture commonly used in smartphones and tablets. While Windows 8 devices (including tablets) are closer in nature to traditional PCs, Windows RT was designed to be a more closed down and "reliable" platform (closer in nature to other post-PC devices such as the iPad), and aside from included desktop programs such as Internet Explorer 10 and Office 2013, can only run apps.

During a presentation in January 2012, Intel's senior vice president Tom Kilroy questioned the arrival of a post-PC era, citing a survey of college students where 66% of its respondents still considered the PC to be the "most important" device in their daily lives. In 2011, Intel introduced Ultrabook—specifications and a marketing platform for a class of subnotebook with an emphasis on portability, responsiveness, productivity, and long-lasting battery life. In 2012, Intel introduced new Atom system-on-chip designs for Android smartphones and Windows 8 tablets, codenamed "Medfield" and "Clover Trail" respectively. Intel stated that Clover Trail tablets could achieve "all-day" battery life, and unlike Windows RT devices, still provide backward compatibility with applications designed for previous versions of Windows. Windows 8 also spurred OEM interest in "convertible" devices, a form factor of devices that can act as either a laptop or tablet, often by having a keyboard accessory they can be docked upon.

While Google already produces the Android operating system used by many tablets and smartphones, it also introduced ChromeOS—an operating system designed for personal computing built around its popular Chrome web browser, in 2009. Primarily shipping on netbooks known as Chromebooks, ChromeOS is designed for users who frequently use web applications and cloud-based services (such as Google's own Play and Drive)—all of its "applications" are web applications, and the OS itself formerly used only a fullscreen web browser as its shell until an update in 2012, which introduced a desktop environment closer to that of other operating systems.

Windows RT was ultimately cannibalized by low-end tablets running the standard Windows 8 operating system—a market incentivized by Microsoft's decision to optimize Windows 8.1 for these devices, and drop Windows OEM license fees on devices with screens smaller than 9 inches in size. By 2015, Microsoft had quietly mothballed Windows RT by ending the production of its remaining first-party devices. Windows 10 revised Microsoft's mobile strategy by focusing on unification of functionality between device classes, including an extension of Windows 8's app platform that allows software to be coded to support multiple device classes running a Windows 10-based operating system, and tailoring its user experience based on available input devices—particularly on "convertible" laptops and tablets.

Microsoft also presented Windows 10 Mobile, an iteration of Windows Phone for smartphones and tablets; the platform supported the ability for devices to be attached to an external display via a docking station, which allowed the use of a PC-like interface with USB mouse and keyboard support. However, Windows 10 Mobile never achieved any significant degree of popularity or market share in comparison to Android or iOS, and support for Windows 10 Mobile ended on January 14, 2020.

== See also ==
- History of personal computers
- History of smartphones
- History of tablet computers
