= Burst mode (photography) =

Shooting mode in still camera

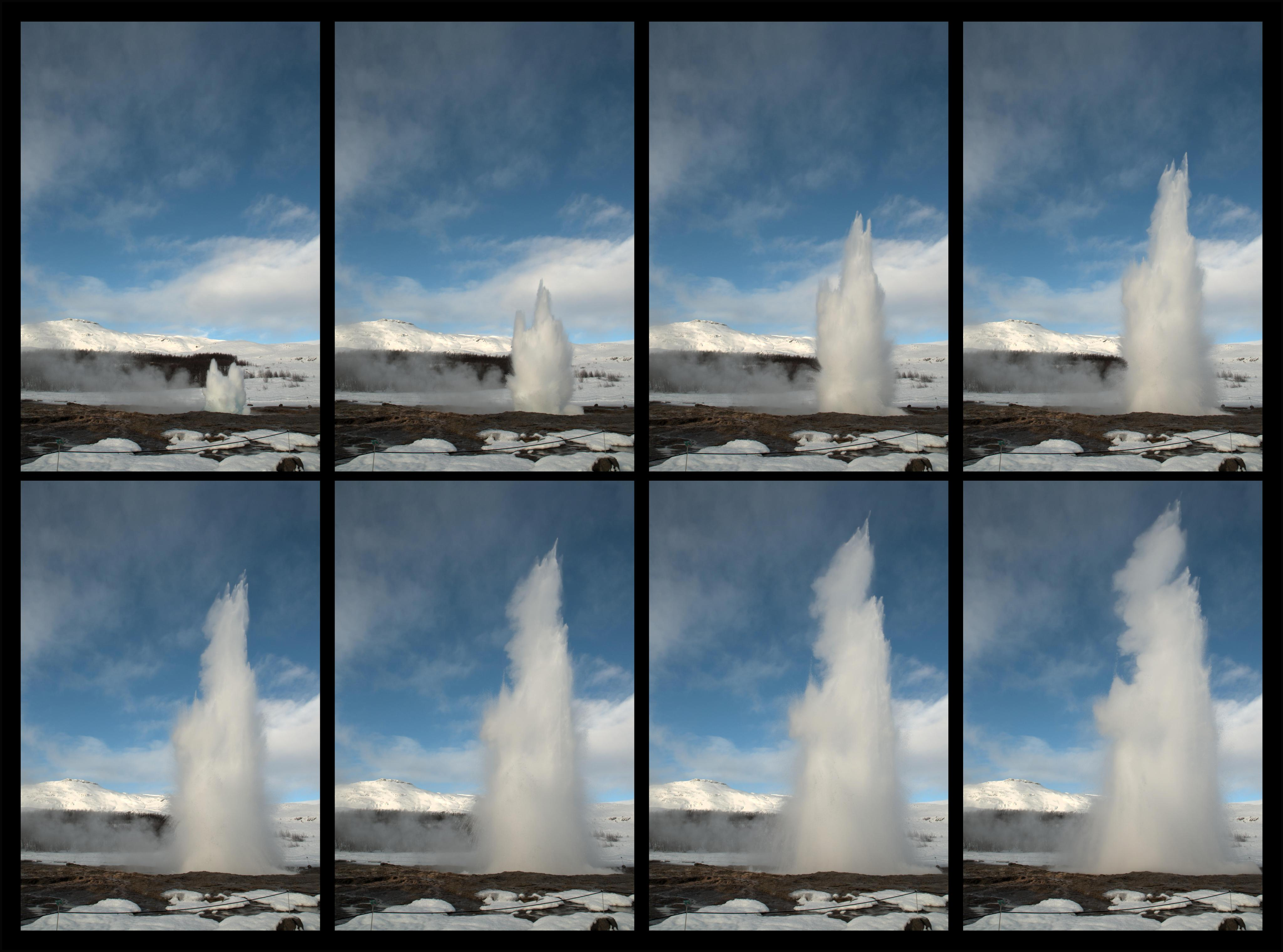
Sequence of continuous high-speed images of an eruption of Strokkur.

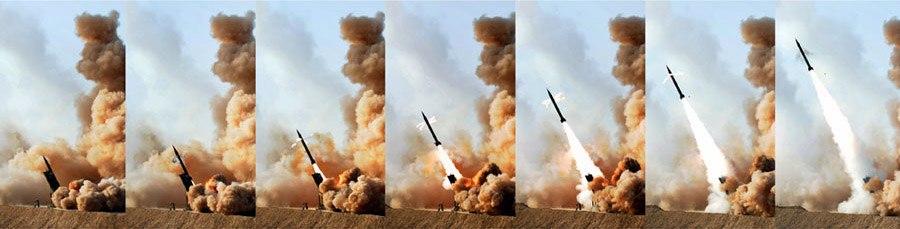
Firing Zelzal 3 in the Great Prophet VI military exercise by IRGC

Burst mode over 25 FPS makes movie

Burst mode, also called continuous shooting mode, sports mode, continuous mode, or burst shot, is a shooting mode in still cameras where several photos are captured in quick succession by either pressing the shutter button or holding it down. This is used mainly when the subject is in successive motion, such as sports photography. The photographer can then select the best image of the group or arrange them in a sequence to study the transitions in detail.

== Details ==
The speed at which successive photographs can be captured depends on several factors, but mainly on the processing power of the camera. Disabling certain features such as post processing which the camera applies automatically after capturing each image will usually allow a faster rate of capture. While some cheaper point and shoot cameras may have a multi-image burst function which allows them to capture a number of frames within a second with a single shutter button press, most film and digital SLR cameras will continue to actuate the shutter for as long as the button is held down, until the memory card fills or the battery runs out, although the rate of capture may significantly slow when the camera's data buffer becomes full.

== Burst rate ==
Frames per second (FPS) tells the rate at which a camera is taking photos. Burst rate tells how many frames can be taken in quick succession, before the frame rate slows down.

== Use ==
Video created from 20 photographs taken from a mobile phone camera in burst mode.

Cameras capable of high continuous shooting rates are much desired when the subjects are in motion, as in sports photography, or where the opportunities are brief. Rather than anticipate the action precisely, photographers can simply start shooting from right before they believe the action will occur, giving a high chance of at least one frame being acceptable. Most modern digital SLR cameras have continuous shooting rates of between 3 and 8 frames per second, although very high end cameras such as the Canon EOS-1D X Mark II are capable of 14 frames per second with full autofocus, or 16 frames per second when in mirror lock-up mode. The Panasonic Lumix DMC-GH2 is capable of recording 40 still images per second in burst mode, at a slightly reduced resolution. In November 2023, Sony claims the Sony α9 III has the world's fastest burst rate among digital cameras of 120 fps with autofocus tracking.

Most high-end camera phones and some mid-range phones, and a few low end ones, provide burst shooting. For example, the Samsung Galaxy SIII Mini can capture 20 photos continuously at 3.3 fps by tapping and holding the shutter button. Other examples include: Samsung Galaxy Note 3 at 4-5 fps, Apple iPhone 5S at 10 fps, or up to 30 fps with special software, and the ASUS Padfone Mini at 16fps.
