= Asus PadFone =

Smartphone

ASUS PadFone

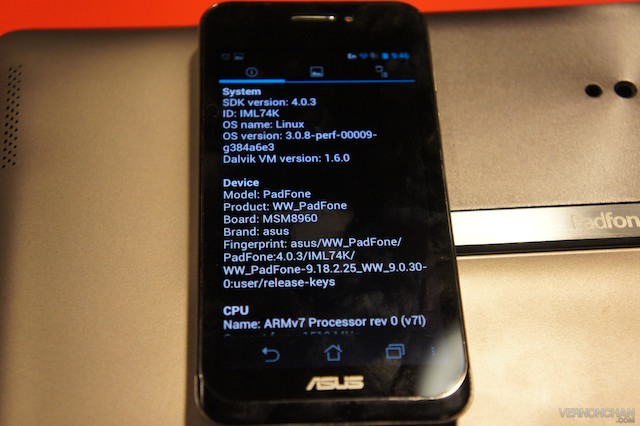
- ASUS PadFone showing system information screen
- Manufacturer: Asus
- Type: Smartphone
- Series: PadFone
- First released: Taiwan: April 2012
- Availability by region: US: June 2012; Australia: August 2012
- Successor: Asus PadFone 2
- Compatible networks: GSM/GPRS/EDGE; 850 900 1800 1900 MHz; UMTS/HSPA; 900 2100 MHz
- Dimensions: 128 mm (5.0 in) H 65.4 mm (2.57 in) W 9.2 mm (0.36 in) D
- Weight: 129 g (4.6 oz) (with battery)
- Operating system: Android 4.0 "Ice Cream Sandwich" with ASUS Waveshare UI
- System-on-chip: Qualcomm Snapdragon S4 MSM8260A
- CPU: 1.5 GHz dual-core Qualcomm Krait
- GPU: Qualcomm Adreno 225
- Memory: 1 GiB RAM
- Storage: 16/32/64 GiB eMMc flash memory
- Removable storage: microSD (up to 64 GiB)
- Battery: 1520 mAh internal rechargeable li-ion 6600 mAh rechargeable li-ion (Padfone Station)
- Rear camera: 8-megapixel (3264×2448) with autofocus, LED flash, 1080p HD video recording
- Front camera: 0.3-megapixel VGA
- Display: 4.3 in (110 mm) capacitive Super AMOLED touch screen with qHD (540×960) resolution
- Media: Audio AAC, AMR, OGG, M4A, MIDI, MP3, WAV, WMA; Video 1920×1080 (1080p HD) @ 30 frame/s – 3GP, .3G2, MP4, WMV, AVI
- Data inputs: ambient light sensor, digital compass, G-sensor, gyroscope, multi-touch capacitive touchscreen, proximity sensor
- References: Official specifications

Asus PadFone is a smartphone manufactured by Asus and released in April 2012. The phone is marketed with companion tablet dock and keyboard dock accessories intended to improve functionality and battery life. It fits into a 10-inch tablet dock. It is not the same as the Asus PadFone mini 4.3, revealed by Asus in December 2013 since that operates on Android 4.3 Jelly Bean and is skinned with the Asus' ZenUI.

== Specifications ==
=== Hardware ===
The Asus PadFone has a 4-inch WVGA (480 x 800 pixel) IPS+ LED-backlit display. The Asus PadFone mini has 8GB of built-in storage, an 8-megapixel 'PixelMaster' rear f/2.0 BSI camera, 2-megapixel front-facing camera, and a 4.5Wh 1170mAh non-removable polymer battery. The tablet dock features an 8.3Wh 2100mAh non-removable lithium polymer battery to supplement this.

=== Software ===
Asus PadFone ships with Android 4.3 "Jelly Bean".

== Successors ==
The successor to this phone is the PadFone 2, which was released in October 2012. It features a 4.7 inch Super IPS+ screen with HD (1280×720) resolution. Its camera is able to record video with 1080p (Full HD) at 30 frames per second and 720p (HD) at 60 frames per second.

The successor to the PadFone 2 is the PadFone Infinity, which was released in April 2013. It features a 5-inch Super IPS+ screen with Super HD display, (1920 x 1200) resolution with 441 ppi.

The successor to the PadFone Infinity is the PadFone X for the US market, which was released in June 2014, and PadFone S for the rest of the world.

The PadFone S (PF500KL) was released in July 2014. Its camera has the ability to record video with 2160p (4K) at 12 to 15 frames per second, 1080p at 30 frames per second and 720p at 60 frames per second.
