= Benoit Schillings =

Belgian software engineer

Benoit Schillings at SHIFT 2026 conf. in Zadar, Croatia giving keynote: 'The Year Ahead, or an Attempt to Predict the Near Term Evolution of AI'

Benoit Schillings is a Belgian software engineer who is vice president of technology at Google DeepMind. He was previously the chief technology officer at Google X leading early projects. He is known for being one of the lead developers of the Be Operating System (BeOS) and is a noted amateur astronomer. He is speaking on technology, astronomy and beyond on conferences like Sciencepreneurship Symposium, Breaking Walls, EmTech, SHIFT and alike.

== Career ==
Schillings' association with Be Inc. began in 1990 when, as a developer of software for the Apple Macintosh, he visited the Apple Expo in Paris and met Jean-Louis Gassée. Gassée, who had just left Apple Computer to found Be, asked Schillings to become the second engineer at Be where he would work on the operating system for a new computer called the BeBox. Schillings accepted the offer and, starting in March 1991, developed a file system (now known as the Old Be File System or OFS) and an associated user-space database application (called Zookeeper) that indexed the metadata in the file system. The file system was fast and efficient, but was later replaced by Dominic Giampaolo's Be File System.

Schillings also developed the graphics system for BeOS (known as the App Server), as well as programming frameworks such as the Interface Kit and Application Kit that are used by software developers to write software for the operating system.

Before joining Trolltech in October 2005, Schillings worked as a "Distinguished Engineer" and CTO at Openwave where, with Mike Reed, he led a team that developed Version 7 of the Openwave Phone Suite mobile phone applications.

Benoit also ran the Android and iOS mobile teams at Yahoo from 2013 until 2017.

== See also ==
- 3dmiX
- futex
