= Jean-Louis Gassée =

French businessman (born 1944)

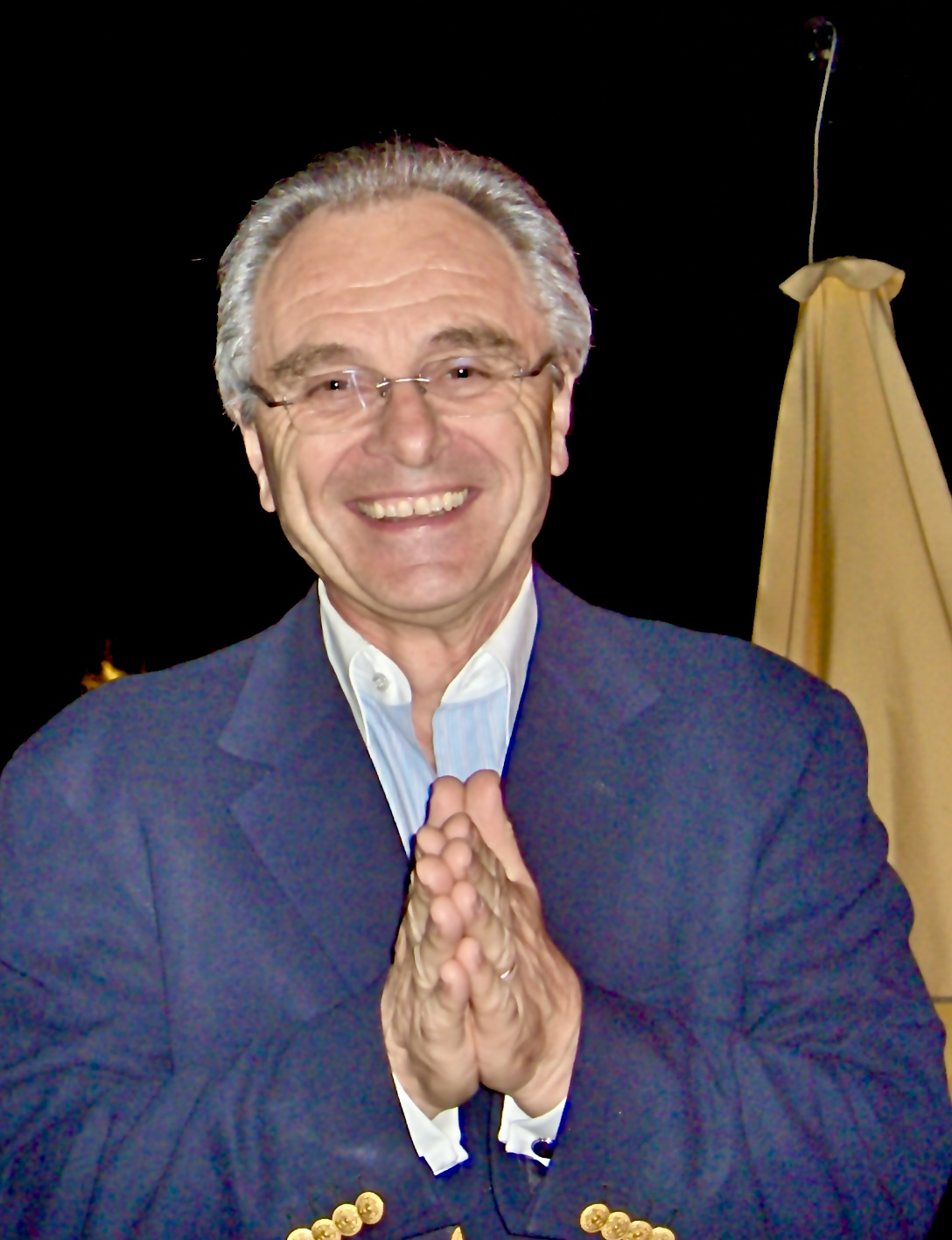
- Gassée in 2006
- Born: 24 March 1944 (age 82); Paris, France
- Education: Orsay University (BS); University of Paris (MS)
- Occupation: Business executive
- Employers: Hewlett-Packard (1968–1974); Data General (1974–1981); Apple Computer (1981–1990); Be (1991–2002); PalmSource (2004–2005)

Jean-Louis Gassée (born 24 March 1944) is a business executive. He is best known as a former executive at Apple Computer, where he worked from 1981 to 1990. He also founded Be Inc., creators of the BeOS computer operating system. After leaving Be, he became Chairman of PalmSource, Inc. in November 2004.

== Career ==
=== HP, Data General, and Exxon Office Systems ===
Gassée worked for six years at Hewlett-Packard from 1968 to 1974, where he was responsible for overseeing the launching of the company's first desktop scientific computer and the development of its sales organization in France, before his promotion to Sales Manager of Europe, in Geneva, Switzerland. From 1974 to 1981, Gassée served as the chief executive officer of the French affiliates of Data General and Exxon Office Systems.

=== 1980s: Apple Computer ===
In 1981, Gassée became Director of European Operations at Apple Computer. In 1985, after learning of Steve Jobs's plan to oust CEO John Sculley over Memorial Day weekend while Sculley was in China, Gassée preemptively informed the board of directors, which eventually led to Jobs leaving Apple.

Later, Sculley personally appointed Gassée to Jobs's old position as head of Macintosh development. Gassée's strategy opposed the "closed-off and non-customizable" approach of Jobs. Gassée introduced several Macintosh products on-stage in the late 1980s including the Macintosh Portable in 1989, and also the Macintosh IIfx. In his product introductions, he was often very comical. Gassée was less formal than many executives. He wore tailored suits when necessary, but he often addressed employees wearing a black (lambskin) leather jacket and a single diamond-stud earring.

When the idea of licensing the Mac OS for other companies use was brought up by various members of Apple, Jean-Louis refused to give in to the idea, maintaining that the Macintosh was more powerful than any other computer at the present, and had a superior architectural roadmap for future expansion than any other computer. Although many of the companies were interested (such as AT&T, for the use of the OS in their own equipment—they were so interested in this idea that the then-CEO of AT&T made a personal phone call to Sculley), Gassée would have none of it, and so the idea of licensing the Mac OS was shelved.

In the mid-1980s, Gassée started the skunkworks project to create what eventually became the Newton MessagePad.

In 1987, Apple CEO John Sculley published his memoir Odyssey. In the hope of inspiring "excellence," he ordered a hardback copy for each Apple employee, at Apple's expense. Shortly afterward, Gassée ordered a paperback copy of Fred Brooks's The Mythical Man-Month for all product-development employees, in the hope of inspiring good sense in project management. Brooks gave a lecture at nearby De Anza College: the room was filled with Apple employees with copies of his book, who told him stories that confirmed his conclusions.

In 1988, Gassée became head of Apple's advanced product development and worldwide marketing, and rumors of his taking over as CEO of Apple from Sculley were circling. Other rumors concerning Michael Spindler were also circulating.

In 1989, Gassée successfully killed a Claris project, 'Drama', which aimed to start a new brand to sell low-end Macintosh computers. Gassée argued that consumers would continue to be willing to pay the premium price for a full Macintosh experience.

In 1990, Gassée was asked to leave Apple after clashes with Sculley on product and pricing. Subsequently, dozens of engineers protested outside. Fearing an engineer exodus, management asked Gassée to stay until the end of the fiscal year. He was delegated to tasks like representing Apple at conferences until he left.

=== 1991–2002: Be Incorporated ===
In 1991, Gassée started a new venture, Be Inc., with the ambitious goal of creating an entire new computer platform, hardware and software, from the ground up. A number of Apple employees left with him, including Steve Sakoman, the developer of the Apple Newton. Be developed a new operating system, optimized for multiple CPUs and multithreaded applications, which became known simply as "the Be Operating System," or BeOS.

BeOS was written for Be's own dual-processor machine, the BeBox; later development releases of BeOS were ported to run on the Macintosh, and Macintosh clone makers, including Power Computing and Motorola, signed deals to ship BeOS with their hardware when the OS was finalized. In light of this, Be stopped production on the BeBox after selling only around 2000 units, and focused entirely on development of BeOS.

In 1996, Apple Computer decided to abandon Copland, the project to rewrite and modernize the Macintosh operating system. BeOS had many of the features Apple sought, and around Christmas time they offered to buy Be for $120 million, later raising their bid to $200 million. However, despite estimates of Be's total worth at approximately $80 million, Gassée held out for $275 million, and Apple balked. In a surprise move, Apple went on to purchase NeXT, the company their former co-founder Steve Jobs had earlier left Apple to found, for $429 million, with the high price justified by Apple getting Jobs and his NeXT engineers in tow. NeXTSTEP was used as the basis for their new operating system, Mac OS X.

After the return of Jobs, Apple withdrew the license to make Macintosh clones. With Intel's assistance, BeOS moved to "Plan B", a port to the x86 platform. While it arguably never grew past a cult following, it sold enough copies to have a nascent development and user community, and had several thousand programs available for it, including several dozen commercial products. BeOS was also used as an embedded operating system in multimedia production systems from Edirol, TEAC and Level Control Systems. However, partially due to behind-the-scenes pressure from Microsoft, Be was not successful in getting top-tier OEMs to bundle BeOS with their hardware - only Hitachi and AST (who were major in Europe at the time) did so - which Gassée saw as fundamental to their success.

At the end of 1999, Be had a "focus shift," giving their desktop OS away for free (with commercial distributions sold by third-party vendors, similar to Linux distributions) to focus on BeIA, a build of BeOS specifically targeted to internet appliances. The company lost several employees who disagreed with this strategy and who had no desire to work on an appliance OS. While there was vendor interest in BeIA and at least one shipping product based on it (the Sony eVilla), the market for internet appliances proved to be nearly non-existent, and Be laid off most of its employees in 2001, with its assets and the remaining engineers being bought by Palm, Inc. for $11 million that August. Gassée stayed on through that transition, but left in January 2002.

=== 2002–present: After Be, Inc. ===
After leaving Be, Gassée served as president and CEO of Computer Access Technology Corporation (CATC), a company which made network protocol analyzers, but left within a year (CATC was purchased in fall 2004 by LeCroy Corporation, a competitor). Gassée resurfaced as a general partner at Allegis Capital, a venture capital fund based in Palo Alto, California, where he is still in position.

In November 2004, Gassée became chairman of PalmSource, where several former Be executives and engineers still worked. He departed in late 2005.

In 2009, he started contributing regularly to the Monday Note blog, a newsletter covering the intersection of media and technology which is now a part of Medium.
