= Dominic Giampaolo =

American software developer

Dominic P. Giampaolo is a software developer who helped develop the Be File System for the Be Operating System (BeOS) and currently works at Apple Inc.

After graduating from Lewiston High School in Lewiston, Maine in 1987, he started studying political science at American University in Washington, D.C., but changed to computer science after one semester. After completing his bachelor's degree, he did a master's degree at Worcester Polytechnic Institute.

After graduating, he travelled to the west coast to work for Silicon Graphics in their Advanced Systems Division. There he worked in the group that ported IRIX to the 64-bit R8000 microprocessor chip set and worked on the RealityEngine and InfiniteReality graphics systems. While working for Silicon Graphics, he located and fixed a bug in Discreet Logic's Flame compositing system that was delaying post-production of the motion picture Speed.

In October 1995, Giampaolo heard about the BeBox from a friend at a poker game. Shortly after visiting the Be Inc. offices to see a demo of the computer, he began working on the BeOS, working initially in a number of areas including the kernel and the POSIX layer but most notably developing the Be File System alongside Cyril Meurillon, which replaced the Old Be File System written by Benoit Schillings which had itself replaced the original flat file system written by Meurillon. The Be File System included a number of advances compared to other personal computer filesystems in use at the time, such as a journal to improve reliability and support for extensive metadata that can be indexed to respond quickly to searches.

After Be, Giampaolo worked at Google and then QNX Software Systems. While at QNX, he discovered a bug in the Instruction Fetch Unit of Intel Pentium II and Pentium III processors.

From March 2002 until May 2026, Giampaolo worked for Apple Inc., where he was part of the macOS file system (Apple File System project) and Spotlight groups.

== Bibliography ==
- Giampaolo, Dominic (1999). Practical File System Design with the Be File System. Morgan Kaufmann. ISBN 1-55860-497-9.
