= History of the iPhone =

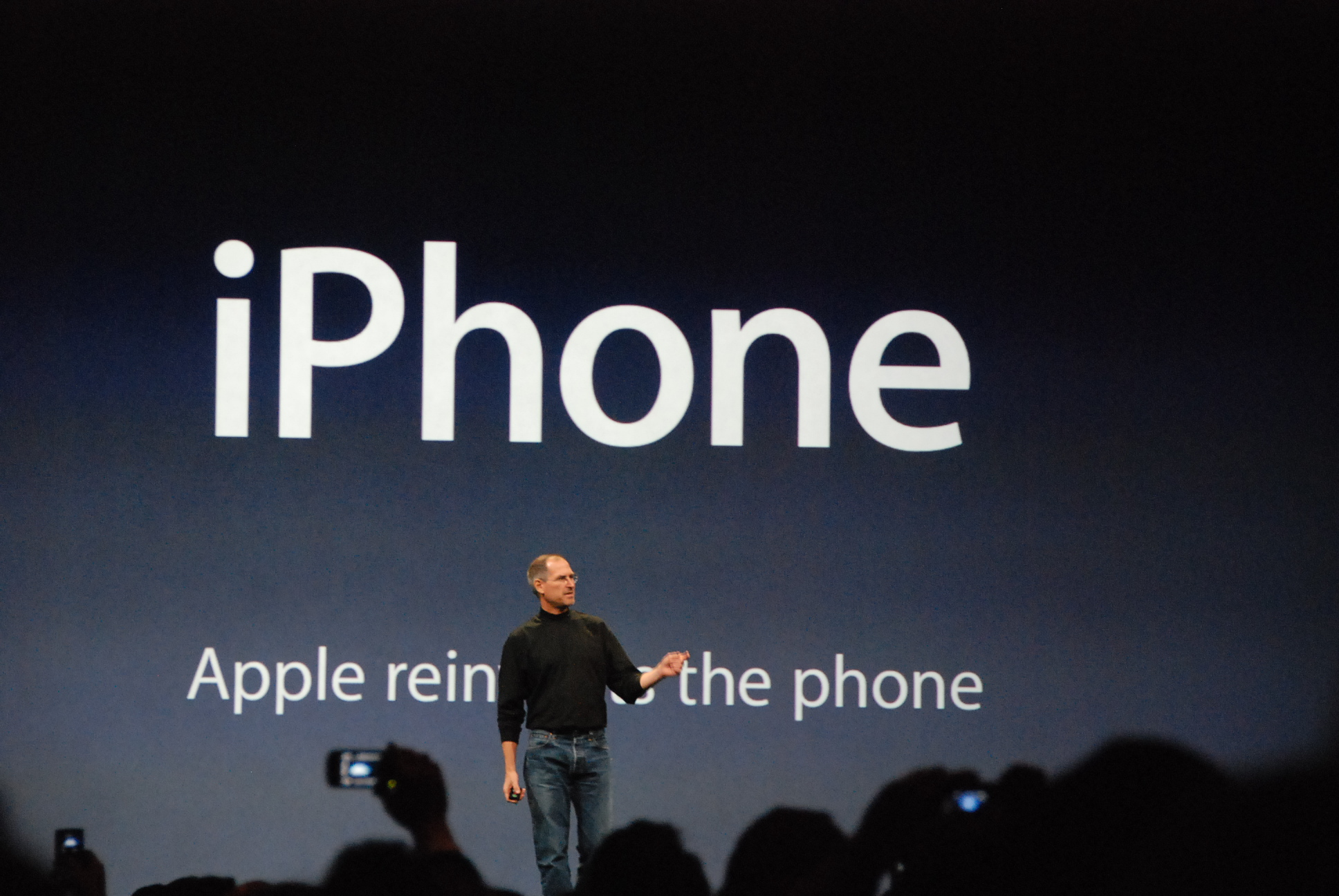
Steve Jobs announcing the first iPhone at the Macworld convention on January 9, 2007

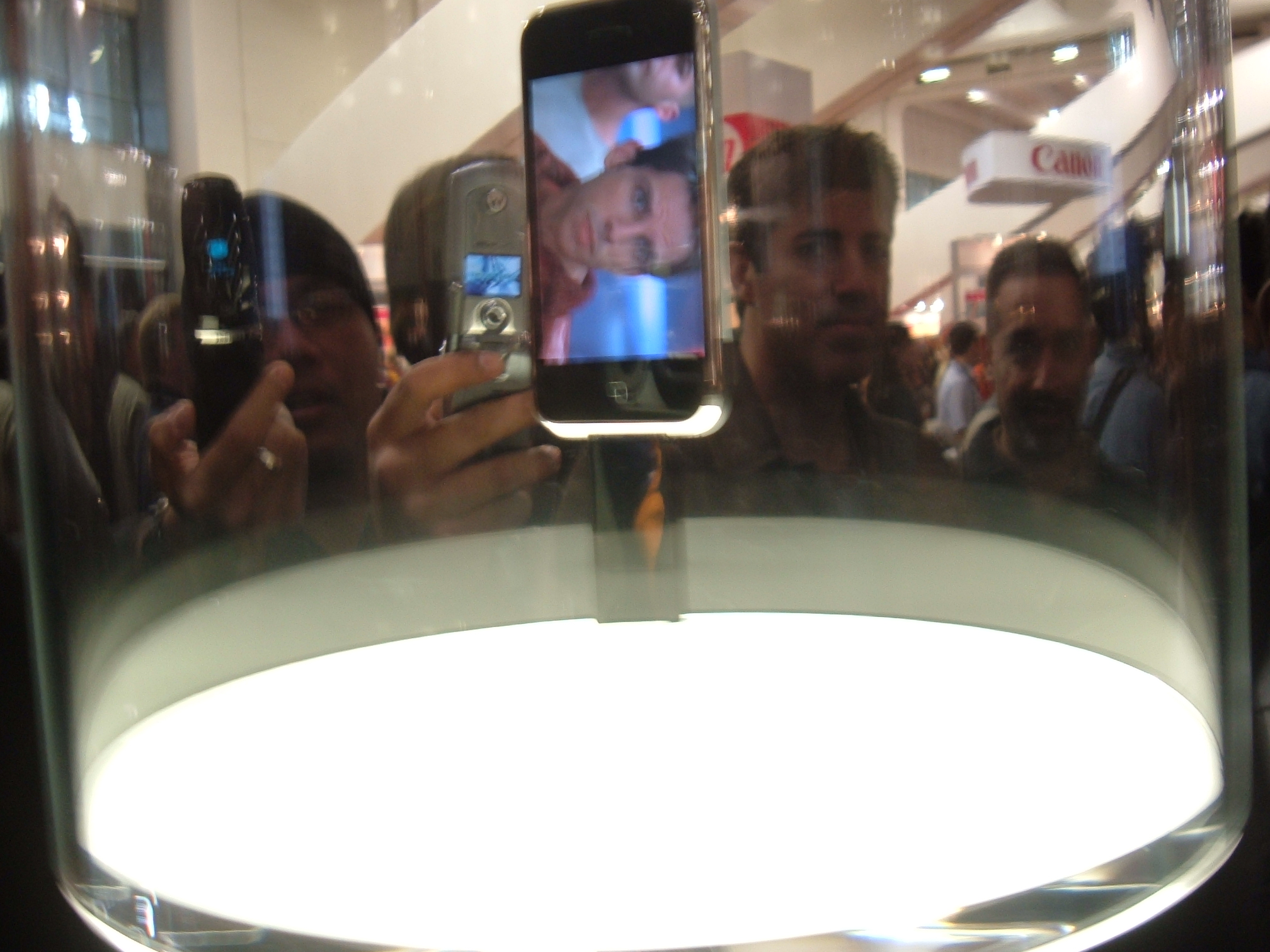
First iPhone on display under glass at Macworld 2007

The iPhone is a line of smartphones developed and marketed by Apple Inc. since 2007. Its development began in the early 2000s. The first iPhone was unveiled by then–Apple CEO Steve Jobs at Macworld 2007 and released later that year. By the end of 2009, iPhone models had been released in all major markets. Apple has continued to release new iPhone models annually, with the iPhone 17 introduced in 2025, and the iPhone 18 Pro and iPhone 18 Pro Max introduced in 2026.

== Conception and initial development ==
In the early 2000s, the success of Apple's iPod, which dominated the digital music player market, prompted speculation among analysts about Apple's potential expansion into other portable devices, including a mobile phone. Jean-Marie Hullot, a senior software engineer who worked at NeXT and later Apple, said he urged CEO Steve Jobs to launch a mobile phone project in 2000.

An official project within Apple for developing the iPhone began with a request on November 7, 2004, from Jobs to the company's hardware engineer Tony Fadell, software engineer Scott Forstall and design engineer Sir Jonathan Ive to work on the highly confidential "Project Purple". However, Jobs noted in his announcement keynote for the first iPhone that he had been looking forward to it for two and a half years, suggesting that the project began in mid-2004.

While pitting two teams of engineers led by Fadell and Forstall, Jobs decided to investigate the use of touchscreen devices and tablet computers (which later came to fruition with the iPad). Jobs ended up pushing for a touch-screen device that many have noted has similarities to Apple's previous touch-screen portable device, the Newton MessagePad. Like the MessagePad, the iPhone is nearly all screen. Its form factor is credited to Apple's chief design officer, Jonathan Ive.

Jobs expressed his belief that tablet PCs and traditional PDAs were not good choices as high-demand markets for Apple to enter, despite receiving many requests for Apple to create another PDA. In 2002, after the iPod launched, Jobs realized that the overlap of mobile phones and music players would force Apple to get into the mobile phone business. After seeing millions of Americans carrying separately a BlackBerry smartphone, a phone, and MP3 players such as the iPod; he felt eventually consumers would prefer just one device.

Jobs also saw that as cell phones and mobile devices kept amassing more features, they would challenge the iPod's dominance as a music player. To protect the iPod new product line, which by the start of 2007 was responsible for 48% of all of Apple's revenue, Jobs decided he would need to venture into the wireless world. So at that time, instead of focusing on a follow-up to their Newton PDA, Jobs had Apple focus on the iPod. Jobs also had Apple develop the iTunes software, which can be used to synchronize content with iPod devices. iTunes had been released on January 9, 2001.

Several enabling technologies made the iPhone possible. These included lithium-ion batteries that were small and powerful enough to power a mobile computer for a reasonable amount of time; multi-touch screens; energy-efficient but powerful CPUs, such as those using the ARM architecture; mobile phone networks; and web browsers. Apple approached glass manufacturer Corning in 2005 to investigate the possibility of a thin, flexible, and transparent material that could avoid the problem of metal keys scratching up phone screens. Corning reactivated some old research material that had not yet found an application to produce Gorilla Glass.

== Beta to production and announcement ==
In an effort to bypass the carriers, Jobs approached Motorola. On September 7, 2005, Apple and Motorola collaborated to develop the Motorola ROKR E1, the first mobile phone to use iTunes. Jobs was unhappy with the ROKR, among other deficiencies, the ROKR E1's firmware limited storage to only 100 iTunes songs to avoid competing with Apple's iPod nano. iTunes Music Store purchases could also not be downloaded wirelessly directly into the ROKR E1 and had to be done through a PC sync. Apple therefore decided to develop its own phone, which would incorporate the iPod's musical functions into a smartphone.

Feeling that having to compromise with a non-Apple designer (Motorola) prevented Apple from designing the phone they wanted to make, Apple discontinued support for the ROKR in September 2006, and, after creating a deal with AT&T (at the time still called Cingular), released a version of iTunes that included references to an as-yet unknown mobile phone that could display pictures and video. This turned out to be the first iPhone.

On January 9, 2007, Steve Jobs announced the first iPhone at the Macworld convention, receiving substantial media attention. On June 11, 2007, Apple announced at the Apple's Worldwide Developers Conference that the iPhone would support third party applications using the Safari engine. Third parties would be able to create Web 2.0 applications, which users could access via the Internet. Such applications appeared even before the release of the iPhone; the first of these, called OneTrip, was a program meant to keep track of users' shopping lists.

On June 29, 2007, the first iPhone was released. The iPod Touch, which came with an iPhone-style touchscreen to the iPod range, was also released later in 2007. The iPad followed on January 27, 2010.

== Connection to AT&T ==
When Apple announced the iPhone on January 9, 2007, it was sold only with AT&T (formerly Cingular) contracts in the United States. After 18 months of negotiations, Steve Jobs reached an agreement with the wireless division of AT&T to be the iPhone's exclusive carrier. Consumers were unable to use any other carrier without unlocking their device.

Apple retained control of the design, manufacturing and marketing of the iPhone. Since some customers were jailbreaking their iPhones to leave their network, AT&T began charging them a $175 early-termination fee for leaving before the end of their contract.

=== Court cases ===
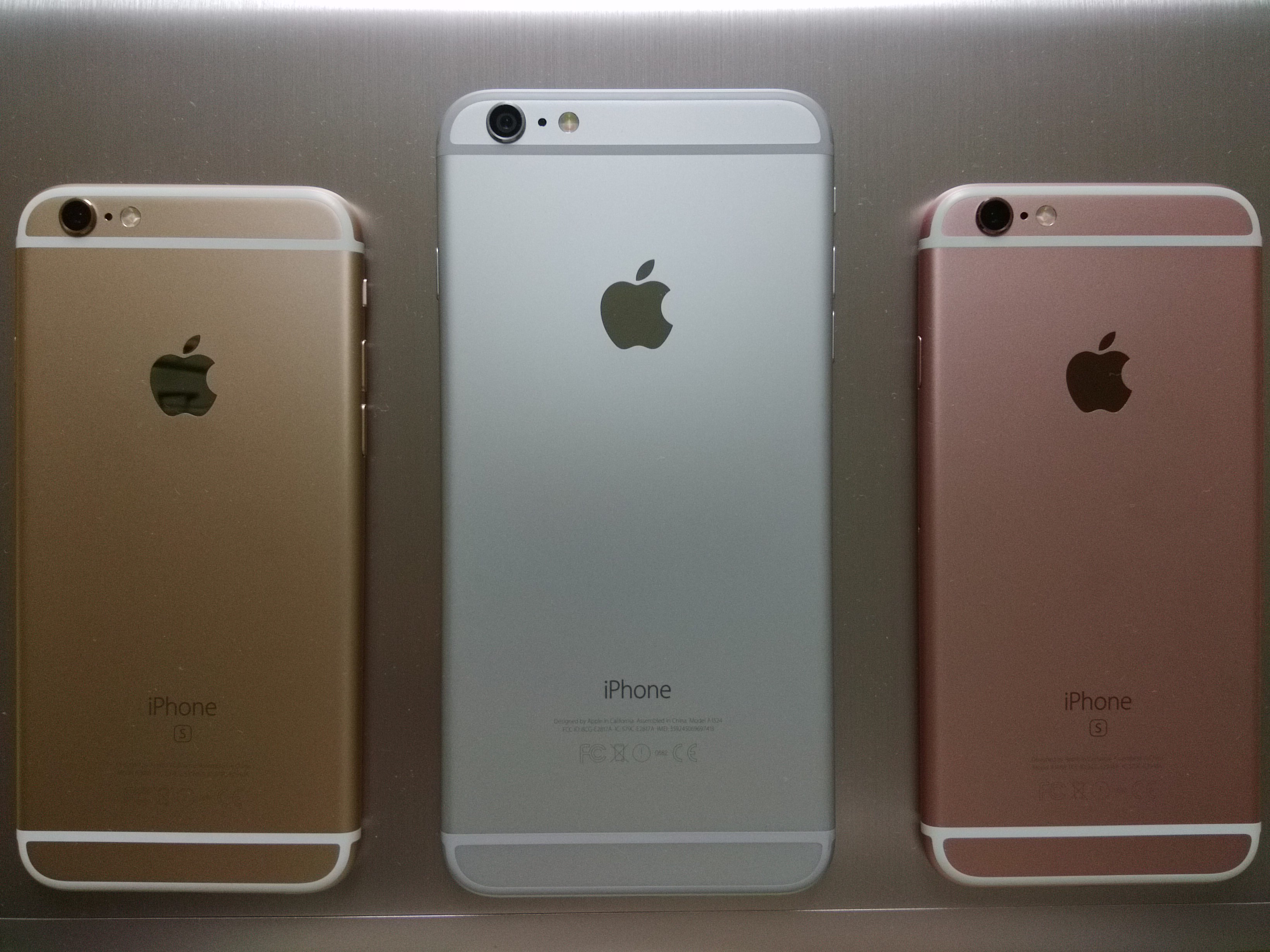
An iPhone 6 Plus alongside two models of the iPhone 6S (back)

Questions arose about the legality of Apple's arrangement after the iPhone was released. Two class-action lawsuits were filed against the company in October 2007: one in Federal court and the other in state court. According to the suits, Apple's exclusive agreement with AT&T violated antitrust law.

The state-court suit, filed by the law office of Damian R. Fernandez on behalf of California resident Timothy P. Smith, sought an injunction barring Apple from selling iPhones with a software lock and $200 million in damages. In Smith v. Apple Inc., the plaintiffs said that Apple failed to disclose to purchasers its five-year agreement with AT&T when they bought iPhones with a two-year contract and cited the Sherman Act's prohibition of monopolies.

The second case was filed in the United States District Court for the Northern District of California. The plaintiff Paul Holman filed a complaint against Apple and AT&T Mobility that he could not switch carriers or change SIM cards without losing iPhone improvements to which he was entitled. Holman also cited a Sherman Act violation by the defendants. On July 8, 2010, the case was affirmed for class certification. On December 9 the court ordered a stay on the case, awaiting the Supreme Court's decision in AT&T v. Concepcion (disputed whether the state's basic standards of fairness were met by a clause in AT&T's contract limiting complaint resolution to arbitration). On April 27, 2011, the Supreme Court ruled that AT&T met the state's fairness standards.

In 2017, Apple was sued for its practice of slowing down older phone models for battery performance. The plaintiffs, Stefan Bogdanovich and Dakota Speas, filed the lawsuit when their iPhone 6S was slower after an update. The plaintiffs were entitled to compensation due to the interferences and the economic damages they suffered.

== United States release ==
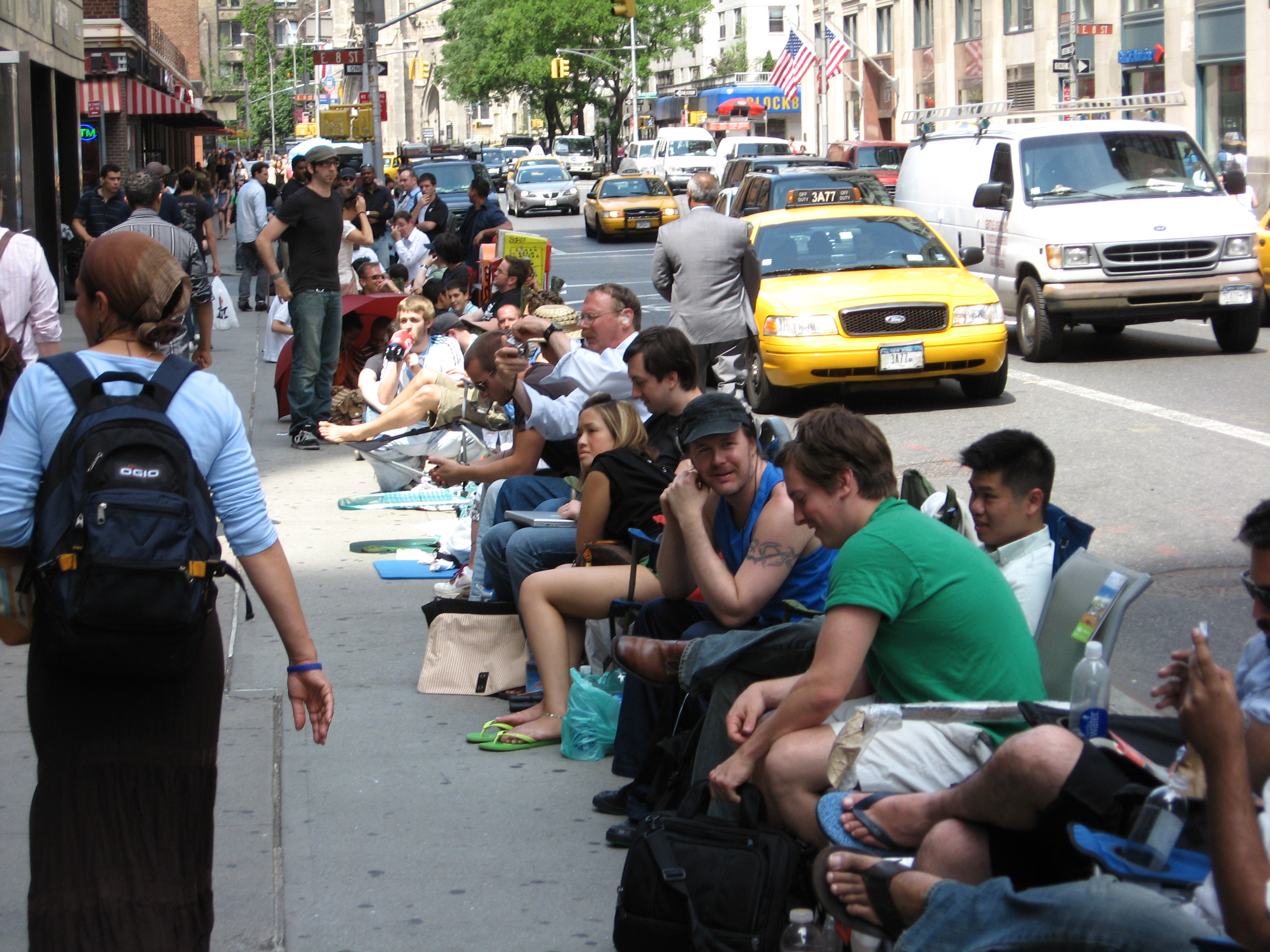
People waiting to buy the iPhone upon release in New York City, June 29, 2007

On June 28, 2007, during an address to Apple employees, Steve Jobs announced that all full-time Apple employees and those part-time employees who had been with the company for at least one year would receive a free iPhone. Employees received their phones in July after the initial demand for the iPhone subsided.

Initially priced at $499 (equivalent to $775 in 2025) and $599 (equivalent to $930 in 2025) for the 4 GB models and 8 GB models respectively, the iPhone went on sale on June 29, 2007. Apple closed its stores at 2:00 pm local time to prepare for the 6:00 pm iPhone launch, while hundreds of customers lined up at stores nationwide.

In the US and some other countries, iPhones could be acquired only with a credit card, preventing completely anonymous purchases of iPhones. At the time, there was no way to opt out of the bundled AT&T data plan. At first, iPhones could not be added to an AT&T Business account, and any existing business account discounts could not be applied to an iPhone AT&T account. AT&T changed these restrictions in late January 2008.

The Associated Press also reported in 2007 that some users were unable to activate their phones because, according to AT&T, "[a] high volume of activation requests [was] taxing the company's computer servers."

Early estimates by technology analysts estimated sales of between 250,000 and 700,000 iPhones in the first weekend alone, with strong sales continuing after the initial weekend. As part of their quarterly earnings announcement, AT&T reported that 146,000 iPhones were activated in the first weekend. Though this figure does not include units that were purchased for resale on eBay or otherwise not activated until after the opening weekend, it is still less than most initial estimates. It is also estimated that 95% of the units sold were the 8 GB model.

=== Oversized bills ===
Stories of unexpected billing issues began to circulate in blogs and the technical press a little more than a month after iPhone's heavily advertised and anticipated release. The 300-page iPhone bill in a box received by iJustine on Saturday, August 11, 2007 became the subject of a viral video, posted by the following Monday, which quickly became an Internet meme. This video clip brought the voluminous bills to the attention of the mass media. Ten days later, after the video had been viewed more than 3 million times on the Internet, and had received international news coverage, AT&T sent iPhone users a text message outlining changes in its billing practices.

==== Company ====
AT&T Mobility, the mobile phone service provider for the iPhone said through spokesman Mark Siegel that the size of this bill was exceptional. "We're not sending lots of boxed bills to customers," he told USA Today. He said that the billing is the same for all AT&T mobile users, but the popularity and functionality of the iPhone gave it new visibility, claiming "It's no different than with any other bill for any other device or any other service that we offer."

Later, on August 18, AT&T issued a statement saying: "Our customers have the option of receiving a bill that is detail-free. Also, we have for years encouraged our customers to switch to online billing because it is convenient, secure, and environmentally friendly." Then, on August 22, AT&T announced via text message to iPhone users that it was removing itemized detail from paper bills. Ezarik responded, "Looks like they may have got the message," in response to AT&T's action. Company spokeswoman Lauren Garner claimed public reaction was not the reason for the company's switch from detailed to summary billing, saying, "This was something we planned all along."

==== Industry ====
AT&T may not have anticipated the downstream effects of iPhone customers' high data usage.

Internet reporter Dana Blankenhorn stated that the size of the bill illustrated a problem with the telephone companies' "event based" or connection-oriented business model and used it to argue for open spectrum in a radio frequency spectrum auction in the US scheduled for 2008. He contrasted how telephone billing considers every action a separately billable event, while the Internet model is based on a flat fee for best-effort delivery in connectionless mode transmission.

The information technology magazine Computerworld reported on the incident, saying the company's "extraordinarily detailed billing process resulted in some users receiving bills that ran "dozens or even hundreds of pages long". It published the gaffe in its list of "Technology's 10 Most Mortifying Moments".

==== Environmental ====
Rob Enderle, a Silicon Valley tech analyst also echoed Ezarik's environmental activism, saying, "AT&T should get a new tagline – use AT&T, kill a tree." The USA Today story was also titled "How many trees did your iPhone bill kill?" According to blogger Muhammad Saleem, Apple's aim to have 10 million iPhone users by the end of 2008 would require the logging of about 74,535 trees annually, assuming an average 100-page monthly bill. An editorial in The Blade, an independent newspaper in Toledo, Ohio called the detailed billing "absurd and environmentally wasteful".

==== Security ====
One security conscious commenter on the Engadget consumer electronics blog addressed the privacy implications of the oversize bills given the limitations of personal paper shredders, by speculating on whether it would be easier to dispose of these large bills by burning them to protect personal information. An editor for the libertarian monthly Reason also speculated about the usefulness of the detailed information to government investigators. The original Ars Technica blog posting, on the other hand, dismissed privacy concerns, showing that the detail pages do not contain sensitive information.

==== Other outsized iPhone bills ====
Press accounts of this story also included related details and comments:

- The founder of a Tampa, Florida, think tank received a 42-page bill and told a reporter, "It's ridiculous."
- An Oak Harbor, Ohio, teacher called his 52-page bill "the biggest phone bill I've ever gotten in my life".
- A partner of a Macintosh consulting firm called his bill "60 pages of nothingness".
- A business consultant from Virginia received a 62-page bill and asked a reporter, "Why would you send bills that large?"
- A software company owner near Seattle, Washington, posted on his blog a picture of a Maltese dog sitting on his 127-page bill spread out on the floor and asked, "Has anyone on the Apple Environmental Team seen an AT&T bill?"
- "The Packet Rat" columnist wrote in Government Computer News that his wife received a 150-page boxed iPhone bill and commented, "OK, how many trees did they have to kill to send out the first month's bills?"

=== Price drop outcry ===
On September 5, 2007, the 4 GB model was discontinued, and the 8 GB model price was cut by a third, from US$599 to US$399. Those who had purchased an iPhone in the 14-day period before the September 5, 2007, announcement were eligible for a $200 "price protection" rebate from Apple or AT&T. However, it was widely reported that some who bought between the June 29, 2007, launch and the August 22, 2007, price protection kick-in date complained that this was a larger-than-normal price drop for such a relatively short period and accused Apple of unfair pricing.

In response to customer complaints, on September 6, 2007, Apple CEO Steve Jobs wrote in an open letter to iPhone customers that everyone who purchased an iPhone at the higher price "and who is not receiving a rebate or other consideration", would receive a $100 credit to be redeemed towards the purchase of any product sold in Apple's retail or online stores.

=== iPhone 3G pricing model changes ===
With the July 11, 2008, release of the iPhone 3G, Apple and AT&T changed the US pricing model from the previous generation. Following the de facto model for mobile phone service in the United States, AT&T would subsidize a sizable portion of the upfront cost for the iPhone 3G, followed by charging moderately higher monthly fees over a minimum two-year contract.

=== iPhone 4 CDMA release ===
There had been ongoing speculation in the United States that Apple might offer a CDMA-compatible iPhone for Verizon Wireless. This speculation increased on October 6, 2010, when The Wall Street Journal reported that Apple would begin producing a CDMA-compatible iPhone, with such a model going on sale in early 2011.

On January 11, 2011, Verizon announced during a media event that it had reached an agreement with Apple and would begin selling a CDMA iPhone 4. The Verizon iPhone went on sale on February 10, 2011. The CDMA version was a bespoke model, lacking a SIM slot and with a revised metal chassis, the design of which would be reused on the iPhone 4S.

During Apple's official unveiling of iPhone 4S on October 4, 2011, it was announced that Sprint would begin carrying the reconfigured CDMA iPhone 4 and iPhone 4S in the US on October 14. Cricket Wireless announced on May 31, 2012, that it would become the first prepaid carrier in the US to offer iPhone 4 and iPhone 4S, beginning June 22, 2012. A week later, Virgin Mobile USA became the second American prepaid carrier to offer iPhone 4 and 4S, announcing plans to release the phones on June 29, 2012. T-Mobile USA's inability to provide iPhone to customers raised its subscription churn rate, decreased the percentage of lucrative postpaid customers, and contributed to parent Deutsche Telekom's decision to sell it to AT&T in March 2011, although AT&T canceled the deal in December 2011 because of antitrust concerns. T-Mobile began offering iPhone on April 12, 2013.

== Connector changes ==
=== iPhone 5 and the Lightning connector ===
With the release of the iPhone 5 on September 21, 2012, Apple introduced a thinner and stronger design for the iPhone. This design included the availability of the colors: black and white. Gold was later introduced for the first time with the iPhone 5s. Sapphire materials were used for home button and the camera to help resist scratches and fingerprints, while anodized aluminum and ceramic glass were used for the phone's body. Support for 4G LTE internet was also added.

With the iPhone 5, Apple abandoned the 30-pin dock connector in favor of the Lightning connector. This change was a surprise to business owners and consumers alike as this swap was unexpected.

=== iPhone 15, iPhone 16e, and USB-C ===
With the releases of the iPhone 15 and iPhone 15 Pro in September 2023, Apple switched from the Lightning connector to USB-C. The iPhone's transition to USB-C ports was complete with the release of the iPhone 16e in February 2025.

== International release timeline ==
The international release of iPhone was staggered over several months. As of October 2026, the iPhone is available in most countries.

Date	Country	Carrier(s) (released date)
June 2007	United States (1)	AT&T (2007), Verizon (February 2011), Sprint (October 2011), C Spire Wireless (Late 2011), Cricket (June 2012), Virgin Mobile (June 2012), T-Mobile (April 2013), Boost Mobile (November 2013), U.S. Cellular (November 2013)
November; 2007	United Kingdom† Germany France‡ (4)	O_{2}, 3, T-Mobile, Orange, Vodafone, EE, Tesco Mobile§, Virgin Mobile (November 2013)
March; 2008	Austria† Ireland (6)	T-Mobile, O_{2}, Orange
July; 2008	Australia† Belgium‡ Canada† Denmark Finland Hong Kong†‡ Italy†‡ Japan Mexico Netherlands New Zealand Norway†‡ Portugal† Spain Sweden Switzerland† (23)	3, movistar, Optus, Orange (Mobistar, One, Optimus), Rogers Communications (Fido Solutions, Rogers Wireless), SoftBank, Swisscom, América Móvil (Telcel), TIM, TeliaSonera (NetCom), Telstra, T-Mobile, Vodafone
August; 2008	Argentina† Chile† Colombia† Czech Republic†‡ Ecuador† El Salvador† Estonia Greece†‡ Guatemala† Honduras Hungary India† Liechtenstein† Macau Paraguay Peru† Philippines Poland† Romania Singapore Slovakia† Uruguay† (45)	3, América Móvil (Claro, Comcel, Porta), Era, movistar, O_{2}, Orange, Singtel, Bharti Airtel, Aircel, Globe, Smart – December 2011, Swisscom, TeliaSonera (EMT), T-Mobile, Vodafone, Telenor
September; 2008	Brazil†‡ Latvia Lithuania South Africa Turkey† (50)	TIM, América Móvil (Claro), TeliaSonera (LMT, Omnitel), Turkcell, Vivo, Vodafone (Vodacom), MTN Group, Oi
October; 2008	Luxembourg† Russia‡ (52)	Beeline, MegaFon, MTS
November; 2008	Croatia Egypt† (54)	T-Mobile, Vodafone, Mobinil
Later; 2008	Botswana Cameroon Central African Republic Dominican Republic† Guinea Ivory Coast Jamaica Jordan Kenya Madagascar Mali Malta Mauritius Moldova Nicaragua† Niger Panama Réunion Taiwan† Qatar Senegal United States Virgin Islands Venezuela (79)	América Móvil (Claro, MiPhone), Chunghwa Telecom, movistar, Orange, Vodafone
January; 2009	Thailand (80)	True Move
February; 2009	Saudi Arabia United Arab Emirates (82)	Mobily, Etisalat, du
March; 2009	Bulgaria North Macedonia Indonesia† Malaysia (86)	GLOBUL, T-Mobile, Telkomsel, Maxis
October; 2009	China† (87)	China Unicom
November; 2009	South Korea (88)	KT
December; 2009	Guam Qatar Uganda Israel (92) Singapore	GTA Teleguam, Vodafone, Orange, Pelephone, Cellcom, StarHub, M1
March; 2010	Vietnam Armenia (94)	Viettel Mobile, MobiFone, VinaPhone, Orange
September; 2010	Tunisia (95)	Orange
June; 2011	Slovenia Trinidad & Tobago (97)	Simobil (now A1), Telekom Slovenije, bmobile
December; 2013	Sri Lanka	Dialog Axiata
May; 2014	Kosovo (98)	IPKO
October; 2014	Serbia	MTS, Telenor Serbia, Vip Mobile

† iPhone offered by multiple carriers under contract from Apple (country not carrier-exclusive)

‡ iPhone offered without contract and without carrier lock

§ MVNO with O_{2}

== Intellectual property ==
Apple has filed more than 200 patent applications related to the technology behind the iPhone.

LG Electronics claimed the design of the iPhone was copied from the LG Prada. Woo-Young Kwak, head of LG Mobile Handset R&D Center, said at a press conference: "we consider that Apple copied Prada phone after the design was unveiled when it was presented in the iF Design Award and won the prize in September 2006." Conversely, the iPhone has also inspired its own share of high-tech clones.

On September 3, 1993, Infogear filed for the US trademark "I PHONE" and on March 20, 1996, applied for the trademark "IPhone". "I Phone" was registered in March 1998, and "IPhone" was registered in 1999. Since then, the I PHONE mark had been abandoned. Infogear trademarks cover "communications terminals comprising computer hardware and software providing integrated telephone, data communications and personal computer functions" (1993 filing), and "computer hardware and software for providing integrated telephone communication with computerized global information networks" (1996 filing).

In 2000, Infogear filed an infringement claim against the owners of the iPhones.com domain name. The owners of the iPhones.com domain name challenged the infringement claim in the Northern District Court of California. In June 2000, Cisco Systems acquired Infogear, including the iPhone trademark. In September 2000, Cisco Systems settled with the owners of iPhones.com and allowed the owners to keep the iPhones.com domain name along with intellectual property rights to use any designation of the iPhones.com domain name for the sale of cellular phones, cellular phones with Internet access (WAP PHONES), handheld PDAs, storage devices, computer equipment (hardware and software), and digital cameras (hardware and software). The intellectual property rights were granted to the owners of the iPhones.com domain name by Cisco Systems in September 2000.

In October 2002, Apple applied for the "iPhone" trademark in the United Kingdom, Australia, Singapore, and the European Union. A Canadian application followed in October 2004, and a New Zealand application in September 2006. As of October 2006, only the Singapore and Australian applications had been granted.

In September 2006, a company called Ocean Telecom Services applied for an "iPhone" trademark in the United States, United Kingdom, and Hong Kong, following a filing in Trinidad and Tobago. As the Ocean Telecom trademark applications use exactly the same wording as the New Zealand application of Apple, it is assumed that Ocean Telecom is applying on behalf of Apple. The Canadian application was opposed in August 2005, by a Canadian company called Comwave who themselves applied for the trademark three months later. Comwave has been selling VoIP devices called iPhone since 2004.

Shortly after Steve Jobs' January 9, 2007, announcement that Apple would be selling a product called iPhone in June 2007, Cisco issued a statement that it had been negotiating trademark licensing with Apple and expected Apple to agree to the final documents that had been submitted the night before. On January 10, 2007, Cisco announced it had filed a lawsuit against Apple over the infringement of the trademark iPhone, seeking an injunction in federal court to prohibit Apple from using the name. In February 2007, Cisco claimed that the trademark lawsuit was a "minor skirmish" that was not about money, but about interoperability.

On February 2, 2007, Apple and Cisco announced that they had agreed to temporarily suspend litigation while they held settlement talks, and subsequently announced on February 20, 2007, that they had reached an agreement. Both companies will be allowed to use the "iPhone" name in exchange for "exploring interoperability" between their security, consumer, and business communications products.

On October 22, 2009, Nokia filed a lawsuit against Apple for infringement of its GSM, UMTS and WLAN patents. Nokia alleges that Apple has been violating ten Nokia patents since the iPhone initial release. This and further lawsuits by Nokia were eventually settled.

In December 2010, Reuters reported that some iPhone and iPad users were suing Apple Inc. because some applications were passing user information to third-party advertisers without permission. Some makers of the applications such as Textplus4, Paper Toss, The Weather Channel, Dictionary.com, Talking Tom Cat and Pumpkin Maker have also been named as co-defendants in the lawsuit.

In August 2012, Apple won a smartphone patent lawsuit in the US against Samsung, the world's largest maker of smartphones; however, on December 6, 2016, SCOTUS reversed the decision that awarded nearly $400 million to Apple and returned the case to Federal Circuit court to define the appropriate legal standard to define "article of manufacture" because it is not the smartphone itself but could be just the case and screen to which the design patents relate.

== Legal battles over brand name ==
In Mexico, the trademark iFone was registered in 2003 by a communications systems and services company, iFone. Apple tried to gain control over its brand name, but a Mexican court denied the request. The case began in 2009, when the Mexican firm sued Apple. The Supreme Court of Mexico upheld that iFone is the rightful owner and held that Apple iPhone is a trademark violation.

In Brazil, the brand IPHONE was registered in 2000 by the company then called Gradiente Eletrônica S.A., now IGB Eletrônica S.A. According to the filing, Gradiente foresaw the revolution in the convergence of voice and data over the Internet at the time. The final battle over the brand name concluded in 2008. On December 18, 2012, IGB launched its own line of Android smartphones under the tradename to which it has exclusive rights in the local market. In February 2013, the Brazilian Patent and Trademark Office (known as "Instituto Nacional da Propriedade Industrial") issued a ruling that Gradiente Eletrônica, not Apple, owned the "iPhone" mark in Brazil. The "iPhone" term was registered by Gradiente in 2000, seven years before Apple's release of its first iPhone. This decision came three months after Gradiente Eletrônica launched a lower-cost smartphone using the iPhone brand. In June 2014, Apple won, for the second time, the right to use the brand name in Brazil. The court ruling determined that the Gradiente's registration does not own exclusive rights on the brand. Although Gradiente intended to appeal, with the decision Apple can use freely the brand without paying royalties to the Brazilian company.

In the Philippines, Solid Group launched the MyPhone brand in 2007. Stylized as "my|phone", Solid Broadband filed a trademark application of that brand. Apple later filed a trademark case at the Intellectual Property Office of the Philippines (IPOPHL) against Solid Broadband's MyPhone for "confusingly similar" to the iPhone and that it may likely "deceive" or "cause confusion" among consumers. Apple lost the trademark battle to Solid Group in a 2015 decision made by IPO director Nathaniel Arevalo, who also reportedly said that it was unlikely that consumers would be confused between the "iPhone" and the "MyPhone". "This is a case of a giant trying to claim more territory than what it is entitled to, to the great prejudice of a local 'Pinoy Phone' merchant who has managed to obtain a significant foothold in the mobile phone market through the marketing and sale of innovative products under a very distinctive trademark", Arevalo later added.

== See also ==
- History of Apple Inc.
- History of mobile phones
- Timeline of Apple Inc. products
- Timeline of iPhone models
- Timeline of iOS devices
