= IPOD (disambiguation) =

The iPod is a portable media player.

IPOD may also refer to:

- IPOD (Insoluble Protein Deposit); See JUNQ and IPOD
- Independent Party of Delaware (IPoD), a political party in the US
- Iouri Podladtchikov (born 1988), a Russian-born Swiss snowboarder, nickname iPod

== See also ==
- iPad (disambiguation)
- iPhone (disambiguation)
