= IPhone (disambiguation) =

iPhone is a line of smartphones by Apple Inc.

iPhone may also refer to:

- iPhone (1st generation), the original iPhone model
- iphone, a line of Android-based smartphones sold by IGB Eletrônica
- iOS, formerly known as iPhone OS until June 2010, a mobile operating system made by Apple Inc.
- iPhone (trademark), the trademark as used by InfoGear, Linksys and Apple
- "iPhone" (song), 2020 song by Rico Nasty
- "iPhone", a song by DaBaby, featuring Nicki Minaj, from the album Kirk
- "iPhone", a song by the band Sparks from the album A Steady Drip, Drip, Drip

== See also ==
- iiPhone, the videophone by Bondwell
- Phione, a Pokémon species
