= IPhone (trademark) =

Trademark used by different companies

iPhone is a trademark used for products by InfoGear, Linksys and Apple. Initially used by Infogear for two models of an internet appliance in 1995 and 1997. In 2000, Cisco acquired InfoGear and started using the trademark in 2006 by making its subsidiary Linksys rebrand an existing series of VoIP-based phones. When Apple released their iPhone, this led to a trademark dispute with Cisco, which was resolved on February 20, 2007. It allowed both companies to continue using the trademark.

== History ==
=== InfoGear ===
InfoGear iPhone
- Manufacturer: InfoGear Technology Corporation
- Type: Internet appliance
- Website: infogear.com/products/iphone at the Wayback Machine (archived 2000-03-01)

The first iPhone was released in 1998 by InfoGear Technology Corporation. In 1997, prior to the release of iPhone, Infogear entered into a partnership with Cidco of Morgan Hill, California. The iPhone was an innovative internet appliance that featured a sliding keyboard and an LCD touchscreen that accessed an embedded web browser and an email client. It was one of the first wave of internet appliances, preceding the I-Opener, 3Com Audrey and a slew of similar devices from various manufacturers including Alcatel and Nortel. Reviewers praised it for offering a simple and "relatively inexpensive" way to access the Internet, but many criticized its size, lack of features, and US $5 per month in addition to the Internet access charge and the purchase price (US $299).

The first-generation InfoGear iPhone shipped in 1997 and the second in 1999.

Infogear was acquired by Cisco Systems in 2000,

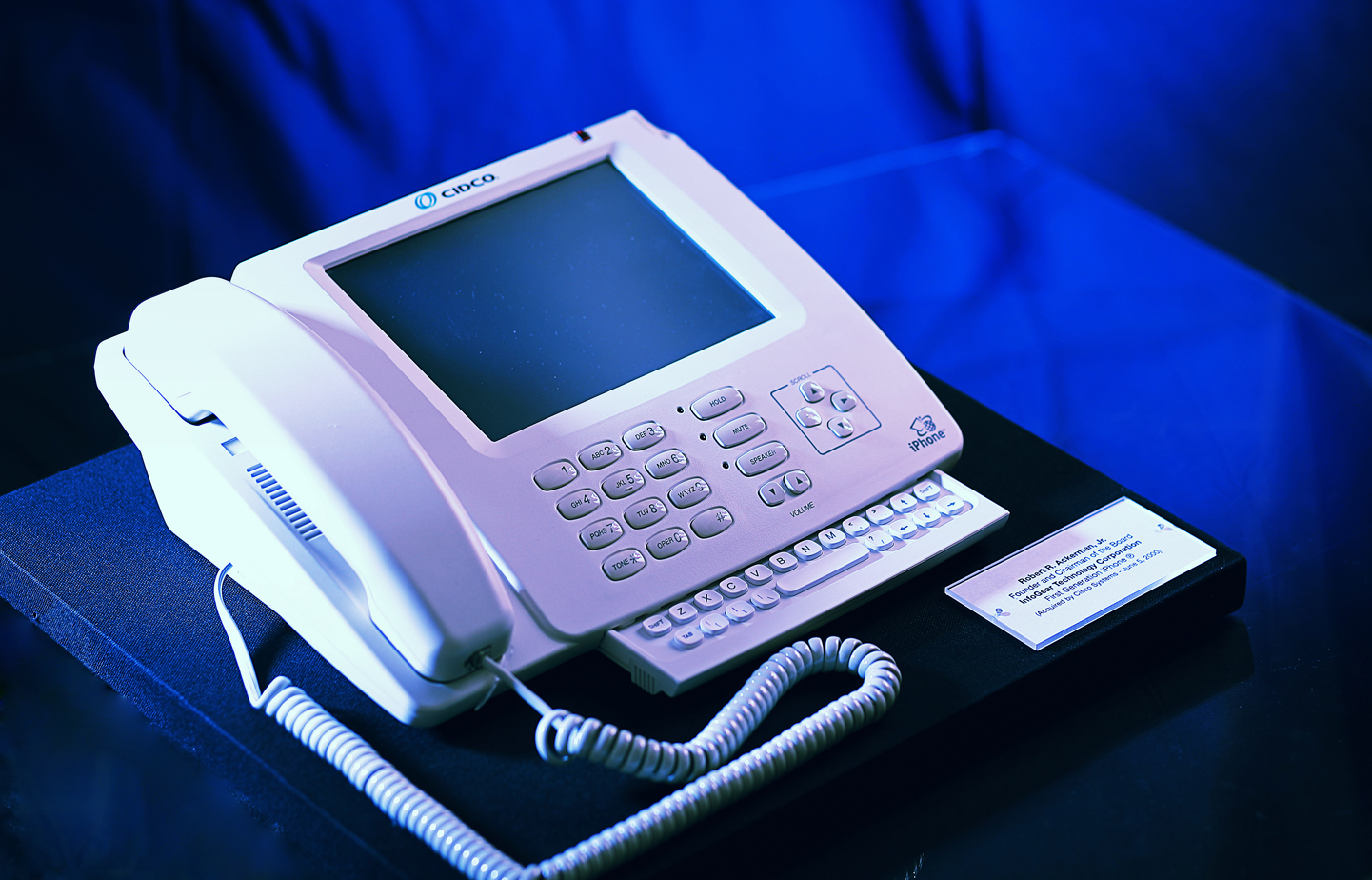
iPhone 1

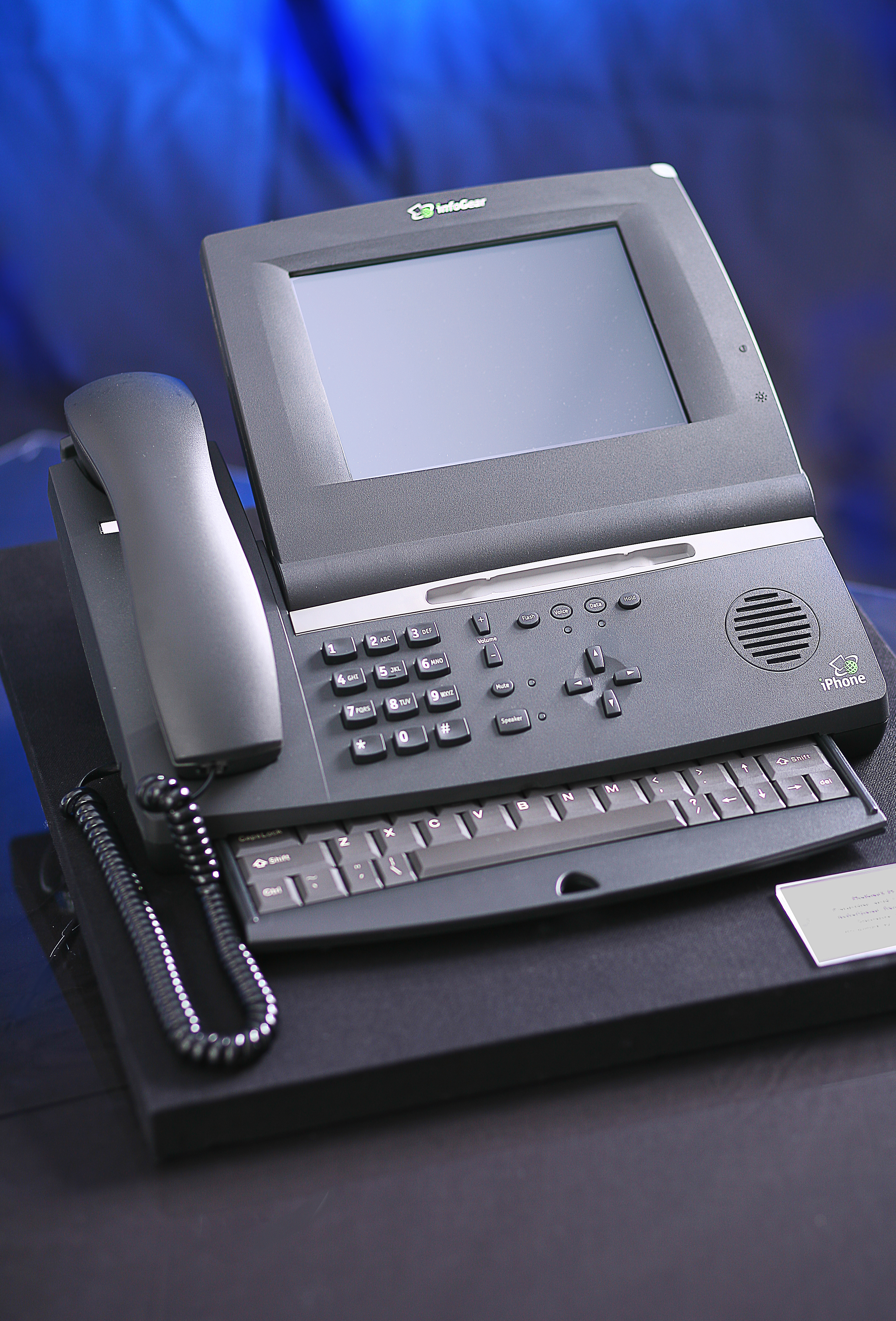
iPhone 2

=== Linksys ===
Linksys iPhone
- Developer: Linksys
- Type: VoIP phone
- Successor: Netgear SPH series
- Website: linksys.com/iphone at the Wayback Machine (archived 2008-03-30)

On December 18, 2006, Cisco Systems rebranded an existing line of Linksys Voice over IP internet phones, as it introduced some additional models.

Linksys was acquired by Cisco in June 2003, long after the production of Infogear iPhone had ceased. Unlike its name-sake predecessor, the new iPhone devices use an existing network and proprietary protocols, such as Skype. Rebranding did not involve any feature changes or introduction of new proprietary technology.

Linksys iPhone WIP line (with WIP300, WIP320 and WIP330 models) released in the same 2006, but as a new line. This line also has relatively neutral reviews.

Linksys iPhone CIT line (with CIT200, CIT300, CIT310 and CIT400 models), released in 2006, was just a rebranding and facelift of (existing from 2004) Linksys CIT line. This line has a neutral reviews.

=== Netgear ===
iPhone technology previously sold by Linksys was previously, but no longer, available from Netgear as the released in 2007 Netgear SPH200D. Handsets for the two are interchangeable. Linksys never sold additional handsets, leaving Linksys CIT400 users with only one handset although the base station for the CIT400/SPH200D supports up to four. The Netgear SPH150D supplemental handset fills that gap.

=== Apple ===
On January 9, 2007, Steve Jobs announced that Apple Inc. would begin selling its mobile smartphone called iPhone in June of that year. Cisco announced shortly after the announcement that Apple had been in negotiations to use the trademark that Cisco acquired with the purchase of Infogear. However, a day later they announced that they were filing a lawsuit against Apple.

Apple and Cisco settled their dispute on February 20, 2007. Both companies will be allowed to use the "iPhone" name in exchange for "exploring interoperability" between Apple's products and Cisco's services and other unspecified terms.
