= TippingPoint =

American computer company

- Logo as of 2008
- Industry: Telecommunications hardware
- Founded: 1999
- Headquarters: Austin, Texas
- Number of employees: 700 (2015)
- Parent: Trend Micro
- Website: tippingpoint.com at the Wayback Machine (archived 2009-03-16)

TippingPoint Technologies was an American computer hardware and software company active between 1999 and 2015. Its focus was on network security products, particularly intrusion prevention systems for networks. In 2015, it was acquired by Trend Micro.

== History ==
The company was founded in January 1999 under the name Shbang! in Texas. Its co-founders were John F. McHale, Kent A. Savage (first chief executive), and Kenneth A. Kalinoski. Its business was to develop and sell Internet appliances.

In May 1999, the company changed its name to Netpliance and in November they released the i-Opener, a low-cost computer intended for browsing the World Wide Web. The hardware was sold at a loss, and costs were recouped through a subscription service plan. When the device was found to be easily modded to avoid the service plan, Netpliance changed the terms of sale to charge a termination fee. In 2001, the Federal Trade Commission fined the company $100,000 for inaccurate advertising and unfair billing of customers.

In 2002, the company discontinued operations of its internet appliance business and renamed itself TippingPoint. CEO Savage was replaced by chairman of the board McHale. McHale stepped down in 2004, but remained chairman of the board. The position was filled by Kip McClanahan, former CEO of BroadJump.

In January 2005, TippingPoint was acquired by the network equipment company 3Com for $442 million, operating as a division of 3Com led by James Hamilton (TippingPoint President), later replaced by Alan Kessler. 3Com itself was subsequently acquired by computer manufacturer Hewlett-Packard in April 2010 for approximately $2.7 billion.

On October 21, 2015, TippingPoint was acquired by Trend Micro for approximately $300 million.

== Technology ==
The TippingPoint NGIPS is a network Intrusion Prevention System (IPS) deals with IT threat protection. It combines application-level security with user awareness and inbound/outbound messaging inspection capabilities, to protect the user's applications, network, and data from threats.

In September 2013, HP announced that it entered the next-generation firewall market with a new line of TippingPoint firewalls. The line extends TippingPoint's existing IPS appliances with traditional stateful packet filtering and application control.
