= Steve Sakoman =

American computing executive

- Born: United States
- Occupation: Computing executive
- Known for: Apple Newton, BeBox, BeOS

Steve Sakoman is an American computing executive. He retired from Apple Computer in 2005 and is now an independent consultant.

He originally worked at Hewlett-Packard as a manufacturing engineer and project manager for the industry's first battery-powered portable MS-DOS PC, the HP 110.

Sakoman moved to Apple Computer in 1984 where he would oversee the hardware groups responsible for the Apple II and Mac product lines. In 1987 he formed the team behind the Apple Newton to realize his vision of the world's first PDA.

Sakoman left Apple in 1990 before the Newton shipped to set up Be Inc. with former Apple executive Jean-Louis Gassée. At Be, he led development of the original BeBox, personally developed BeOS's support for Brooktree video-capture devices, and eventually worked as the company's Chief operating officer. During this time, he ran a webcam inside Be's offices using the CodyCam application.

In 1994 he moved to Silicon Graphics as director of Consumer Products & Technologies Group. This included work on the Nintendo 64 graphics system. He then returned to Be in 1996.

PalmSource acquired Be in 2001 and Sakoman took on a role there as Chief Products Officer, where he was a key member of the team behind Palm OS 5 and Palm OS 6.

Sakoman rejoined Apple in 2003 as Vice-President of Software Technology, reporting to Avie Tevanian.

Sakoman also set up GutenTalk in 2004, a site to discuss ebooks specially formatted for PDAs and other hand-held readers.
