= IPad (disambiguation) =

iPad is a line of tablet computers by Apple Inc.

iPad may also refer to:

- iPad models
  - iPad (1st generation), the original iPad model
- Fujitsu iPAD, retail point-of-sale device
- Proview iPAD, a computer manufactured by the company who sold the iPad trademark to Apple
- "iPad" (song), a 2022 song by the Chainsmokers
- iPad, a fictional product in episode 4 of Mad TV season 11, in 2005

== See also ==
- IPOD (disambiguation)
- Eyepad or eyepatch
