= Virgin Webplayer =

Discontinued Internet appliance

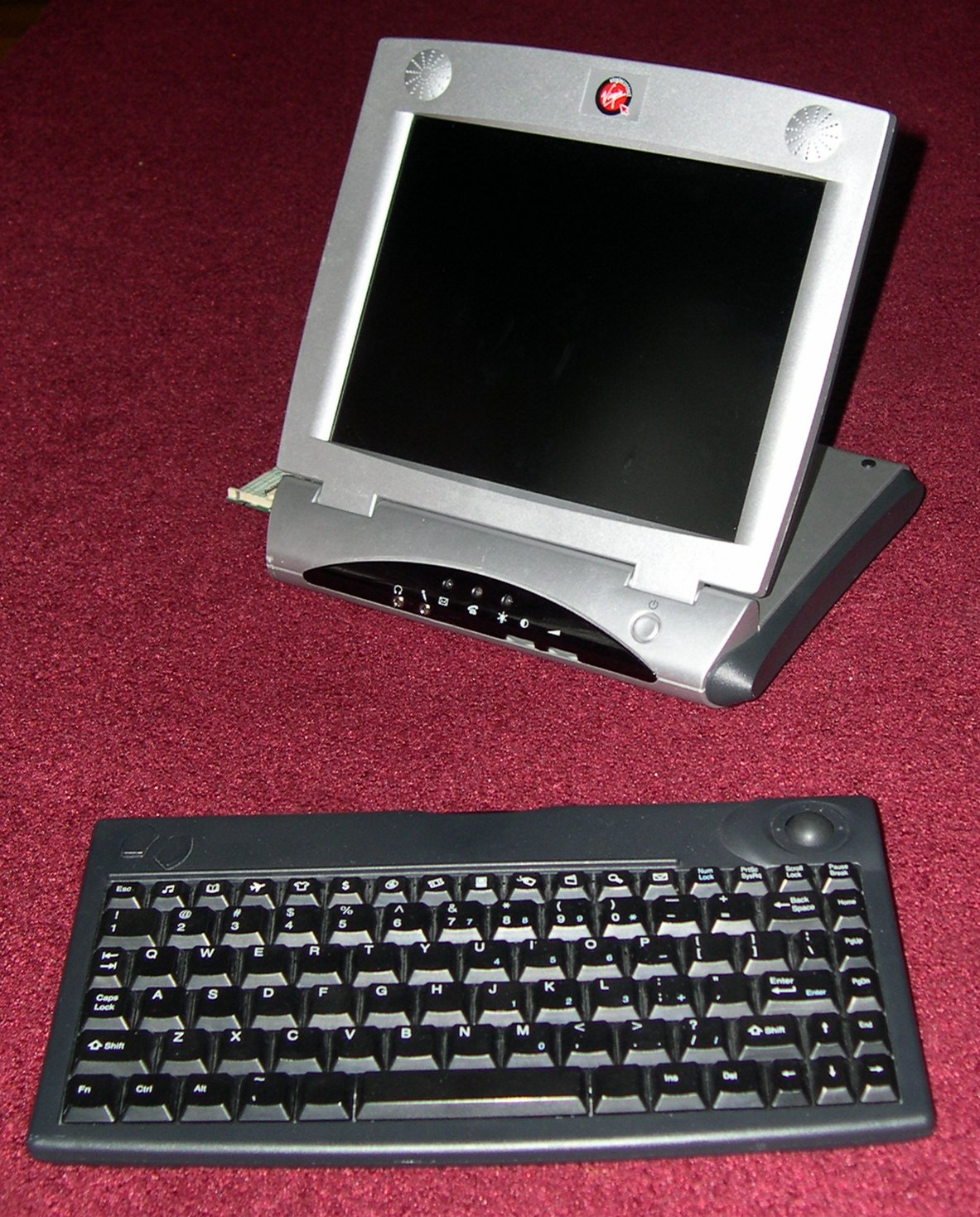
- Developer: Virgin
- Manufacturer: Acer
- Type: Internet appliance
- Lifespan: until November 15, 2000
- Media: M-Systems Disk-on-Chip 2000 (user-accessible)
- Operating system: Custom QNX-based OS, Windows 9x (unofficial), OpenBSD (unofficial)
- CPU: 200 MHz Cyrix MediaGX
- Display: 10 in 800 × 600 SVGA DSTN LCD
- Input: Infrared keyboard with built-in trackball
- Camera: n/a
- Touchpad: n/a
- Connectivity: modem, USB
- Power: 5V 5A AC adapter

The Virgin Webplayer is a discontinued Internet appliance from Virgin Group. The device was intended as a standalone Internet access device, running a specialized operating system which limited it to the Virgin Connect ISP. It was discontinued on November 15, 2000. The remaining Webplayer hardware was liquidated and embraced by the hardware hacker community.

The Virgin Connect service was innovative — for $50, a user would get the Webplayer and unlimited dial-up Internet access (provided through Prodigy) for three years. However, the Webplayer displayed advertisements while the user was online.

== Hardware ==
The Webplayer is essentially a compact x86 PC and was manufactured by Acer under contract by Boundless Technologies and is also known as the Boundless iBrow. Input came through an infrared keyboard with an integrated trackball, and the webplayer came with a modem for connecting to the Internet.

The Webplayer is powered by a 200 MHz Cyrix MediaGX CPU, 64 MB of SO-DIMM RAM, and a 48 MB M-Systems Disk-On-Chip 2000 for storage. It included two USB ports and contained a Mini PCI Type IIIB slot and 44-pin IDE header inside. CompactFlash, VGA, and PS/2 keyboard and mouse headers are present on the motherboard, but the physical connector is not included.

== Hacking ==
After the demise of official support, the Webplayer drew the attention of computer enthusiasts. A grassroots Co-Op effort was created to purchase a lot of Webplayers from a liquidator, with over 50 members signing up. Eventually, the units were shipped out at $100 each and the hacking began.

The Virgin operating system was locked to dial into Virgin Online, but a password-protected setup screen was available. A user discovered the scheme and created a utility to guess the rotating password frequently enough to allow an owner to reprogram the device to call into any ISP. However, the experience of using the Virgin OS was not what users wanted, so more serious hacking attempts quickly began.

Since the Webplayer is architecturally similar to a typical x86 PC and included an IDE header, initial attention was focused on accessing the password-protected system BIOS. An insider leaked the password schwasck and the device was quickly converted into a full-fledged PC. Users could simply purchase a 44-pin IDE cable and hard disk drive and run any PC-compatible operating system.

The next efforts included creating a version of Microsoft Windows that would fit in the 48 MB Disk-On-Chip device. This was quickly accomplished, with a version of 98lite widely distributed. Attempts to create a specialized Linux distribution were less successful, since the Webplayer included specialized graphics hardware which was not well-supported at the time.

Users eventually turned to the Mini-PCI slot, adding Ethernet and 802.11 adapters designed for notebooks. These proved far more reliable than the originally-used USB Ethernet adapters, as the Webplayer's USB hardware was not entirely stable.

Other popular modifications included increasing the system RAM (it used a standard 144-pin PC100 SO-DIMM) and overclocking the CPU. Some users modified the Webplayer case to accept a built-in CD-ROM drive, Ethernet ports, and Wi-Fi antennas.

== Issues ==
The Webplayer hardware proved to have a few stability issues:

- The USB ports are somewhat unreliable with Ethernet adapters, though they seem to work well with storage and input devices
- The audio system will distort unless the Line-In is muted
- The display adapter is not well-supported and its VGA modes are incomplete
- The ACPI/APM BIOS does not work well, with suspend and resume problems common

== See also ==
- Internet appliance
- i-Opener
- 3Com Audrey
