= 3dmiX =

3dmiX is a computer program for BeOS that displays each track of an audio as an object on the virtual 3D sound stage and allows the users to modify its panning and volume by dragging the object around. The program was previously named 3dsound and also Benoit's Mix after its creator, Benoit Schillings, now CTO at Google X. The program is often cited as an example of a cool application for BeOS.
