= EPods =

ePods, Inc., was a short-lived American technology company active from 1999 to 2000. Its flagship product was the ePodsOne (EP1), an internet appliance. ePods was founded in 1999 as a subsidiary of Salton Inc. during the dot-com bubble era. ePods and the EP1 was discontinued in 2000. The EP1 was described as:

- Compact and light Internet appliance, about the size of a magazine
- Requires only power and a phone line
- 256-color, 8.2-inch, 640 x 480 LCD touchscreen controlled by stylus; also includes onscreen keyboard
- Customized Internet content and 5 e-mail accounts ($24.99 monthly service)
- 129 MHz, 32-bit RISC processor, 16 MB RAM, 56 kbit/s modem, rechargeable NiMH battery,
- PCMCIA Slot II port, 2 USB ports, a serial port, IrDA 1.1 port, internal microphone, headphone and microphone jacks
- Windows CE operating system
- 2.2 pounds
- Partnered with Google for search
- Originally $199 (retail)

The product lives on as a hacked platform.

== Reviews ==
- Bloomberg BusinessWeek's ePodsOne: An Internet Appliance That Shows Promise.
- EdgeReview's Internet Anywhere, For Cheap (archived webpage)
- The Seattle Times The `e' in ePods? It stands for `easy'
