= SkyOS =

Operating system

- Developer: Robert Szeleney
- Working state: Discontinued
- Source model: Closed source
- Initial release: December 15, 1997; 28 years ago
- Marketing target: Desktop users
- Available in: Multilingual
- Supported platforms: IA-32
- Kernel type: Monolithic
- License: Proprietary
- Official website: web.archive.org/web/20130901090439/http://www.skyos.org/

SkyOS is a discontinued prototype commercial, proprietary, graphical desktop operating system written for the x86 computer architecture. Its first version was released in 1997, and its last beta build was released in 2008.

As of January 2009, development of the OS has been halted, with no plans to resume its development.

In August 2013, developer Robert Szeleney announced the release of a public beta on the SkyOS website. This allows public users to download a Live CD of the SkyOS operating system, for testing and to optionally install the system.

== History ==
A very early version of SkyOS

Development started in 1996, with the first version released in December 1997. Up until version 4.x, the OS was freely available. Starting with beta development of SkyOS 5 in 2003, users were required to pay US$30 to get access to beta releases. SkyOS adapted new filesystem SkyFS based on OpenBFS in 2004, and its graphics subsystem was improved in 2006 with support for desktop compositing, including double buffering and transparency. The OS also moved to ELF binaries then. The last beta build 6947 was released in August 2008, and there was no status update for several months. As the OS was mainly the work of one man, Robert Szeleney, there was increasing difficulty to add new device drivers. Considering lack of development under Robert Szeleney, going open source was viewed by the tech press as the best option for SkyOS. Although Szeleney tried to bypass the lack of drivers by using a new kernel based on Linux or NetBSD, and reported some progress in this regard, development has not resumed. SkyOS website disappeared in 2013 and final public build from August 2008 was released for free shortly thereafter.

== Features ==
SkyOS is a Unix-like operating system with a monolithic kernel. The OS supports multiple users and symmetric multiprocessing.

SkyOS has an integrated graphics subsystem with support for desktop compositing including double buffering and transparency. SkyOS GUI also allows system-wide mouse gestures.

SkyFS is a fork of the OpenBFS filesystem.

SkyOS can also be run from the following filesystems:

- FAT32/FAT16/FAT12
- ISO 9660

SkyOS offers real-time file content query searches with multiple keywords (comparable to Beagle in Linux or Spotlight in macOS), including indexing of files and programs.

== Applications ==
Most command-line applications that were written to be compiled with the GNU Toolchain can be ported to SkyOS with little or no modification.

SkyOS contains several frameworks for creating applications (including Mono port). Ported applications include Mozilla Firefox, Mozilla Thunderbird, Nvu, GIMP and AbiWord. There was also a monetary incentive for porting applications as the SkyOS community voted for desired programs and then supported developers with donations.

== Reception ==
Although SkyOS includes many interesting features, limited application and hardware support are among its weaknesses (e.g. only a few graphics cards allow 2D acceleration). Kernel and drivers updates were solely worked on by Szeleney, and because of this he was unable to keep up with new devices. This was one of the reasons the development ended for this project. In the end, the OS was not able to expand beyond a small albeit dedicated user community. Apart from a short early open source time period, the OS had a proprietary licence with a commercial model based on paid beta-testing. This led to some controversy as SkyOS developers were accused of unauthorized use of open source software. No proof of any wrongdoing was given, but the public image of the OS was tarnished nevertheless.

== See also ==
- List of operating systems
