= I-Opener =

Low-cost internet appliance

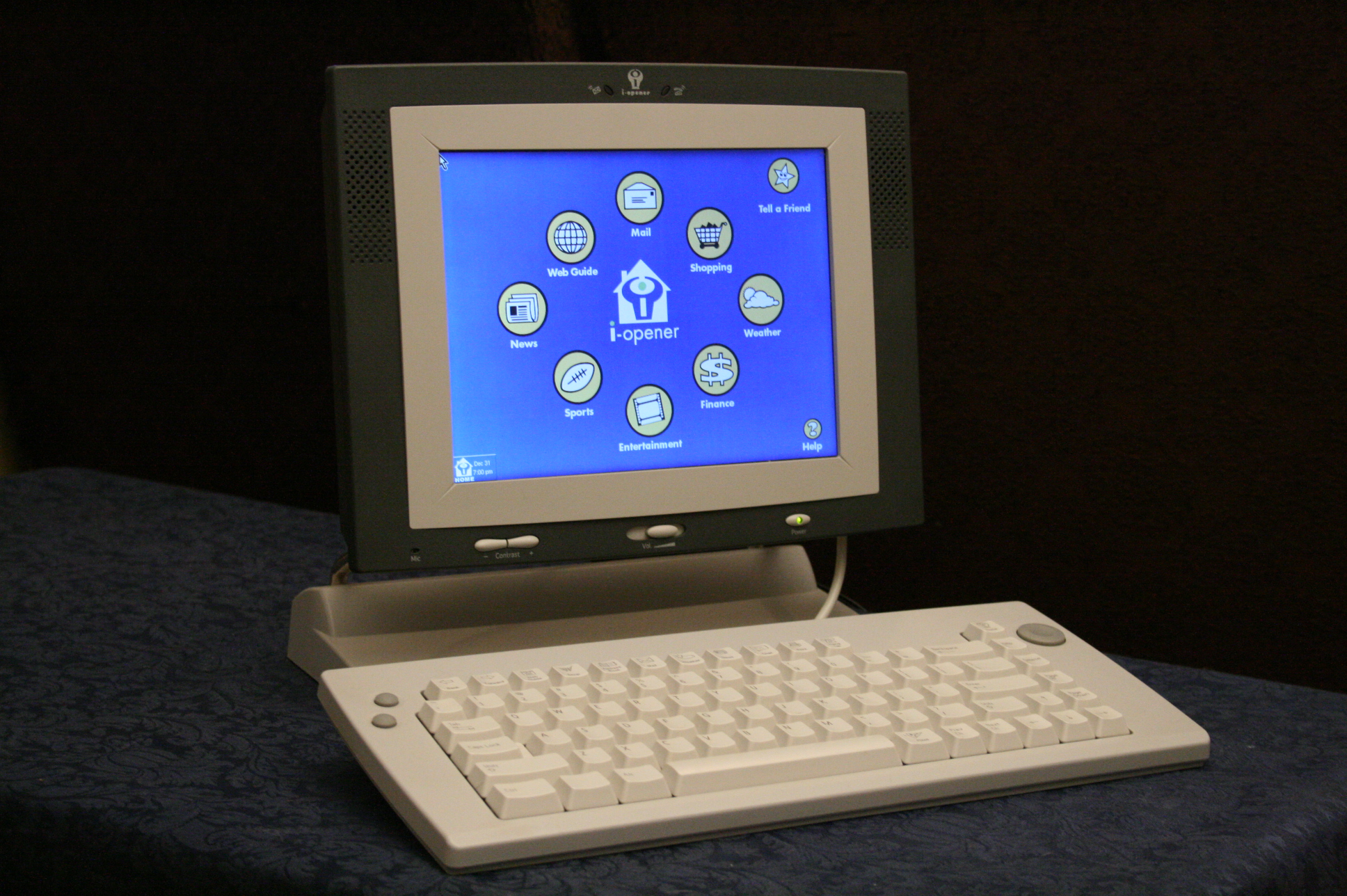
An i-Opener showing the main menu after a fresh boot-up

The i-Opener is a discontinued low-cost internet appliance produced by Netpliance (later known as TippingPoint) between 1999 and 2002. The hardware was sold as a loss leader for a monthly internet service. Because of the low cost of the hardware, it was popular with computer hobbyists, who modified it to run desktop PC software without the internet service.

== History ==
Netpliance introduced the i-Opener in November 1999 at a $99 promotional price. It was designed to be an easy-to-use, low-cost internet appliance for first-time users of the World Wide Web. Access to the internet was limited to Netpliance's own $21/month service plan, and users were limited to Netpliance's own web browser. There was no provision for installing third-party software. The keyboard had a dedicated key for ordering pizza from participating pizza parlors.

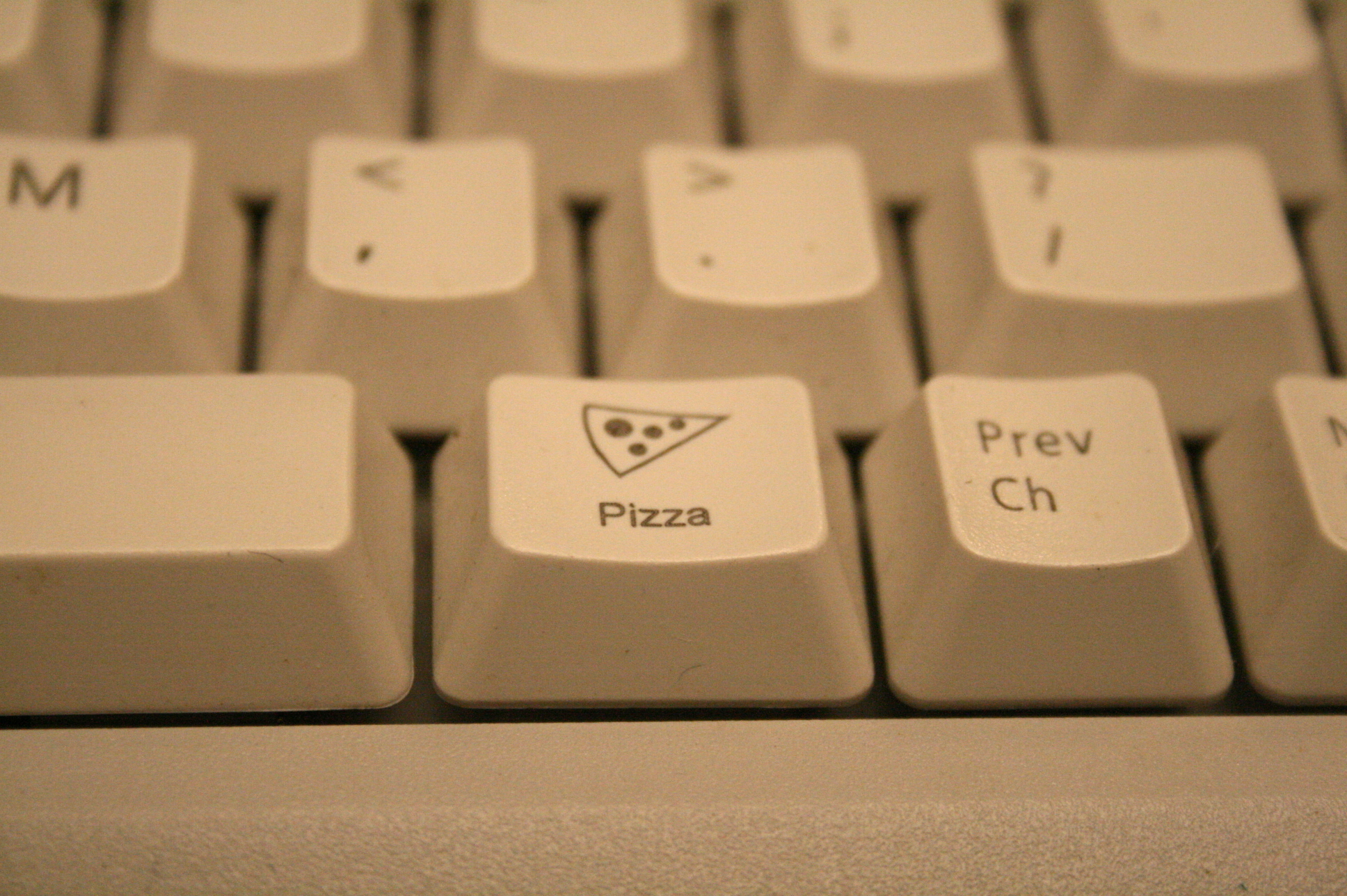
Close up of the keyboard pizza key

The hardware was sold below cost as a loss leader, with the expectation that Netpliance would recoup the money lost in manufacturing costs via its service plan. Analysts estimated the cost of the hardware to be $300–$400, and Netpliance cited costs of $499. The price was planned to increase to $199 after the promotional period. Shortly after the device's introduction, an engineer discovered that it used commodity computer hardware. By modifying the hardware, users were able to load their own software onto the i-Opener, bypassing the need for the subscription service plan. Although this disrupted Netpliance's business model, Netpliance initially welcomed these users, assuming that most customers would not be willing to install custom parts. As demand among computer hobbyists grew, retail outlets reported shortages, and Netpliance attempted to prevent custom hardware or software from being installed on new stock.Originally, the IDE port pins were flipped, needing a special cable to connect a HDD. Later, they installed a new BIOS, removing the ability to boot off of other mediums. However this was done rather hastily, leaving the other BIOS that could still boot the other mediums. Among other attempts to stop it, they resorted to clipping pins off of the IDE connector before the i-Opener was later taken off the market. Netpliance instead directed people to their developer program. In April 2000, Netpliance canceled existing orders on its website if buyers refused to accept a $499 termination fee for the service plan. Buyers protested the change in the terms of sale, and Netpliance was fined $100,000 by the Federal Trade Commission in 2001. By July 2000, the price of the i-Opener had quadrupled to $400, and Netpliance left the internet device market in January 2002.

== See also ==
- 3Com Audrey
- Virgin Webplayer
- Nettop
- Network Computer
