= 3Com Audrey =

Internet appliance by 3Com

- Logo of the Ergo product series, of which the Audrey is the only product

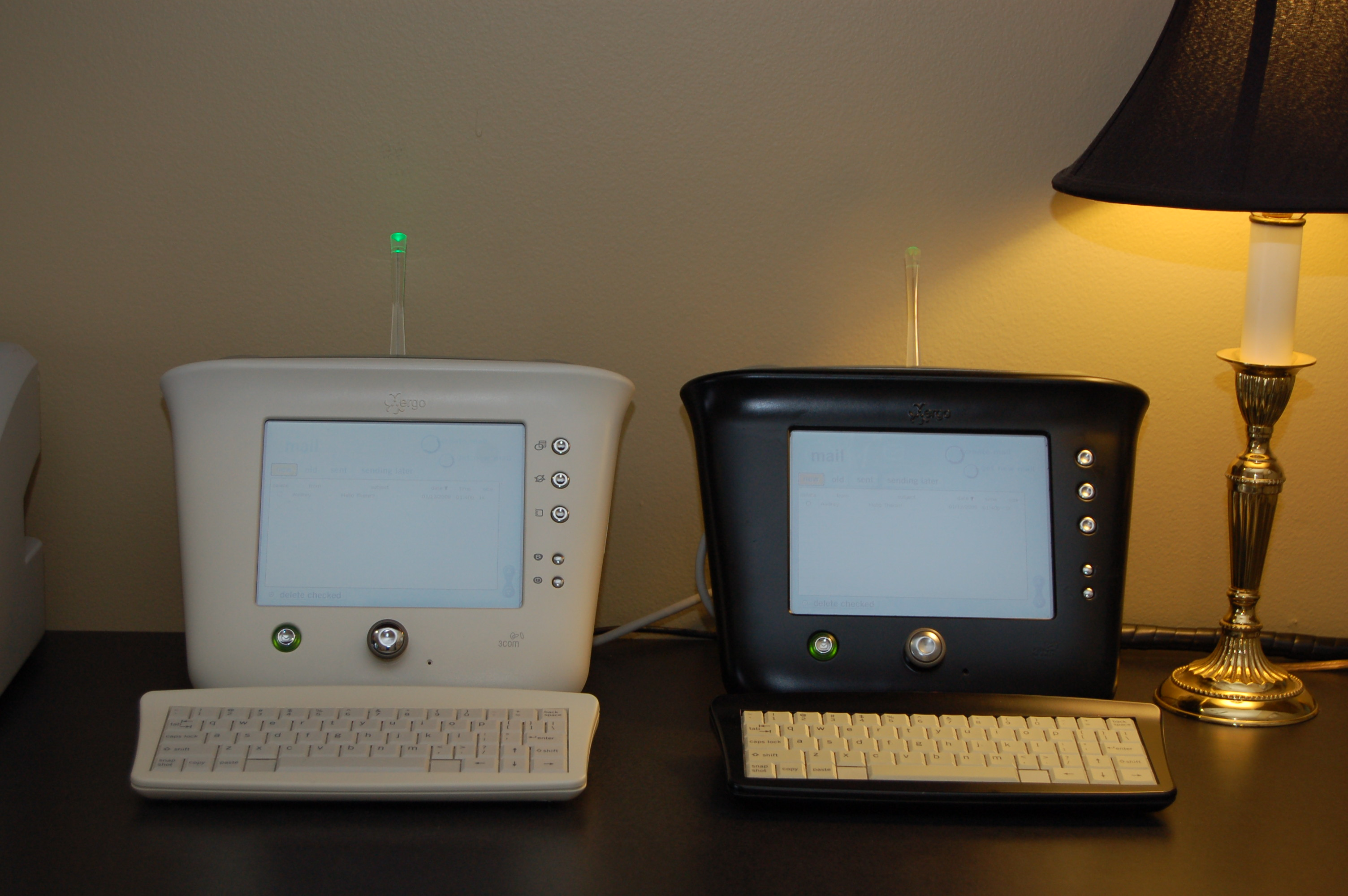
- Manufacturer: 3Com
- Type: Internet appliance
- Released: October 17, 2000
- Operating system: QNX
- CPU: Geode GX 1, 200 MHz
- Display: 640×480
- Input: touchscreen, keyboard
- Connectivity: modem, USB
- Power: AC adapter
- Website: consumer.3com.com at the Wayback Machine (archived 2001-01-24)

The 3Com Ergo Audrey is a discontinued internet appliance from 3Com. It was released to the public on October 17, 2000, for USD499 as the only device in the company's "Ergo" initiative to be sold. Once connected to an appropriate provider, users could access the internet, send and receive e-mail, play audio and video, and synchronize with up to two Palm OS-based devices.

Audrey was the brainchild of Don Fotsch (formerly of Apple Computer and USRobotics) and Ray Winninger. Fotsch and Winninger had a vision for a family of appliances, each designed for a specific room in the house. The brand Ergo was meant to convey that intent, as in "it's in the kitchen, ergo it's designed that way". There were plans to serve other rooms in the house as well. They considered the kitchen to be the heart of the home and the control room for the home manager. Fotsch coined the phrase "Internet Snacking" to describe the lightweight web browsing done in this environment.

The name Audrey was given to this first product to honor Audrey Hepburn. It was meant to deliver the elegance that she exuded. The project codename was "Kojak", named after the Telly Savalas character. The follow-on product targeted for the family room was code named "Mannix".

3Com discontinued the product on June 1, 2001, in the wake of the dot-com crash, after only seven and a half months on the market. Only 3Com direct customers received full refunds for the product and accessories. Customers who had bought Audrey devices through other vendors were not offered refunds and never even notified about the refunds. The remaining Audrey hardware was liquidated and embraced by the hardware hacker community.

== Hardware ==
The Audrey is a touchscreen, passive matrix LCD device and came equipped with a stylus. All applications were touch-enabled. Since the standard infrared keyboard was only needed for typing tasks, it could be hung out of the way on the rear of the unit. The stylus was to be placed in a receptacle on the top of the screen with an LED that flashed when emails arrived. Buttons on the right side of the screen were used to access the web browser, email application, and calendar, and a wheel knob at the bottom selected different "channels" of push content.

The 3Com Audrey is powered by a 200 MHz Geode GX 1 CPU, with 16 MB of flash ROM and 32 MB of RAM. It measures 9 x 11.8 x 3.0 inches (22.86 x 29.97 x 7.62 cm), and weighs 4.1 pounds (1.86 kg). It is powered by the QNX operating system. The Audrey is equipped with a modem, two USB ports, and a CompactFlash socket. A USB Ethernet adapter was commonly used for broadband subscribers.

The Audrey was also available in such shades as "linen" (off-white), "meadow" (green), "ocean" (blue), "slate" (grey), and "sunshine" (light yellow).

== Hacking ==
After the demise of official support, the Audrey drew the attention of computer enthusiasts. They quickly discovered an exploit to launch a term session. Using privilege escalation techniques, the root password in the passwd file could be edited, opening the box to further experimentation.

Many of the tools for the QNX operating system development platform were quickly adapted for use in the Audrey, including an updated web browser (Voyager), an MP3 player, digital rotating photoframe, and other applications.

The CompactFlash slot was also investigated. Although it could not be used for storage expansion, the Audrey was set to flash its operating system from the slot. Soon, a variety of replacement OS images were distributed among enthusiasts.

== Similar devices ==
Devices similar to the Audrey included the i-Opener, the Virgin Webplayer and the Gateway Touch Pad.
