= Fujitsu iPAD =

The Fujitsu iPAD

The Fujitsu iPAD is a lightweight handheld device that was introduced by Fujitsu, in 2002. It runs Microsoft's CE.NET operating system. It supports 802.11b wireless LAN to connect wirelessly with other company infrastructure. The device can support inventory management as well as credit card payments. In January 2010, when Apple announced the Apple iPad, there was a naming controversy between the two devices. To settle the trademark infringement allegation, Apple purchased the trademark rights from Fujitsu. Some trademark analysts estimate that Apple paid Fujitsu over US$4 million in exchange for the March 17, 2010 assignment of Fujitsu's iPad trademark rights to Apple.
