= Sony eVilla =

Internet appliance

The Sony eVilla is a discontinued Internet appliance from Sony. It debuted at the Consumer Electronics Show 2001 and was released to the public on June 14, 2001 for $499 USD after 18 months of development. With the additional $21.95 USD monthly fee, users could access the Internet, send and receive e-mail, play audio and video, and save files to Sony's Memory Stick.

After less than three months in the market, Sony discontinued the product on September 13, 2001. Customers received full refunds for the product and the monthly subscription fee. Spokesman John Dolak remarked that "[the] product did not meet our expectations, it did not operate as planned."

Sony entered the Internet appliance market as other manufacturers were getting out, canceling their plans, and discontinuing their offerings. By the time the Sony eVilla shipped, only 150,000 internet appliance devices had shipped within the past year. In addition, many customers could not justify the purchase of an inherently limited internet appliance when other manufacturers were offering more capable personal computers for the same price.

== Hardware and software ==
The Sony eVilla was powered by a 266 MHz Geode GX 1 CPU, with 64 MiB DRAM, and 24 MiB flash memory. It weighed 31.5 pounds (14.3 kg) and measured 11.81 × 16.18 × 15.82 inches (30 × 41.1 x 40.2 cm). The display was a portrait-style 15 inch (38 cm) Sony Trinitron, with 800×1024 pixel resolution.

There was no hard disk, but the system could read and write to Sony's Memory Stick cards. The included keyboard and mouse were connected by two PS/2 ports, and additional devices could be connected with two USB ports. A 56K V.90 modem was built into the case, which also housed an unused Ethernet port.

The system used the BeIA 1.0 operating system from Be Inc., and supported Java applications, Macromedia Flash animations, and some Microsoft Office file formats. Also included was RealNetworks's RealPlayer. One of the major drawbacks of the eVilla was the inability to save pictures and media from internet sites.
