= MSN Companion =

Discontinued PC terminal

- Developer: Microsoft
- Manufacturer: Vestel eMachines; Compaq
- Released: 1999
- Discontinued: 2003
- Operating system: Microsoft Windows CE

The MSN Companion was a small-scale personal computer terminal that was designed for easy access to MSN services on the Internet, such as Hotmail, while still being cheap and easy to use. They were intended for use by people with little knowledge of computers or technology, and many included several features aimed at the elderly or disabled, such as easier-to-read monitors. The device was designed by Microsoft.

== History ==
The device was first unveiled at the COMDEX conference in November 1999, where it was first described as a 'MSN-based Web companion'. In June 2000, Vestel USA Inc, Compaq and eMachines began working with Microsoft to create the first MSN Companions. Mock-ups of RCA, Acer and Inventec Companions were also seen.

While the MSN Companion was initially received with praise, it did not perform successfully in the market and Microsoft and MSN stopped providing support for Companions in October 2003.

== Early Companion models ==
All MSN Companions ran an early version of Microsoft Windows CE, and were shipped with Microsoft Internet Explorer 4.0. However, the hardware provided by each manufacturer was significantly different, with some companies choosing to use a wireless keyboard over a wired one.

The Vestel package included a 15-inch monitor (or a 10-inch LCD monitor) and a PS/2 keyboard with a touchpad. The device itself had 32MB (+16MB flash) of memory, a 200 MHz Geode processor, two USB ports, a phone jack, and a parallel port.

The eMachines package was similar, offering a 17 or 19-inch monitor instead of an LCD one and an 'eBoard' keyboard and standalone mouse.

The Compaq MSN Companion shipped with an LCD screen and a wireless keyboard with a mouse built-in. Compaq machines had 32MB (+16MB flash) of memory, a 266 MHz AMD processor, four USB ports, a phone jack, and, in some models, an ethernet port for networking.

== See also ==
- Portable Media Center
- Xbox
