= Be Inc. =

Former American computer company

- Final logo from 1999 to 2001
- Type: Public
- Traded as: Nasdaq: BEOS
- Industry: Computer hardware Computer software
- Founded: c. October 1990; 36 years ago
- Founder: Jean-Louis Gassée; Steve Sakoman
- Defunct: March 15, 2002
- Fate: Dissolved
- Headquarters: Menlo Park, California, United States
- Key people: Jean-Louis Gassée (CEO)
- Products: BeOS, BeBox, BeIA
- Number of employees: 98 (as of 1998)
- Website: be.com at the Wayback Machine (archived October 9, 2001)

Be Inc. was an American computer company that created and developed the BeOS and BeIA operating systems, and the BeBox personal computer. It was founded in 1990 by former Apple Computer executive Jean-Louis Gassée, who also served as the company's CEO, and was based in Menlo Park, California.

The company's main intent was to develop a new operating system using the C++ programming language on a proprietary hardware platform; although the result received a mainly positive reception, it had little commercial success. BeOS was initially exclusive to the BeBox before being ported to the Power Macintosh and then to the Intel x86 architecture. After a stint in Internet appliances with BeIA, Be's assets were purchased by Palm, Inc. in 2001.

== History ==
Be was founded by former Apple Computer executive Jean-Louis Gassée in 1990 with Steve Sakoman (with capital from Seymour Cray) after being ousted by Apple CEO John Sculley. Legend says that they started building a prototype computer the day after Gassée left Apple Computer, on October 1, 1990. Soon joined also Erich Ringewald, lead engineer in Apple 'Pink' OS team, as CTO, and joined by a number of other ex-Apple Computer employees. Originally named Be Labs based in San Jose, Gassée and his team worked behind closed doors for over four years before publicly revealing their product.

According to several sources including Macworld UK, the company name "Be" originated in a conversation between Gassée and Sakoman. Gassée originally thought the company should be called "United Technoids Inc.", but Sakoman disagreed and said he would start looking through the dictionary for a better name. A few days later, when Gassée asked if he had made any progress, Sakoman replied that he had got tired and stopped at "B." Gassée said, " 'Be' is nice. End of story." Its original slogan was One processor per person is not enough.

The prototype computer evolved into having five AT&T Hobbit processors. By about 1992, Be had started developing a kernel and interface for the hardware, what would eventually become the BeOS. By 1994 the project was nearing completion, but the sudden discontinuation of Hobbit (AT&T exited the processor business due to weak sales) forced Be to look elsewhere. Eventually, the company adopted the PowerPC platform, and ported the then-yet unreleased BeOS to PowerPC.

=== BeBox and BeOS ===
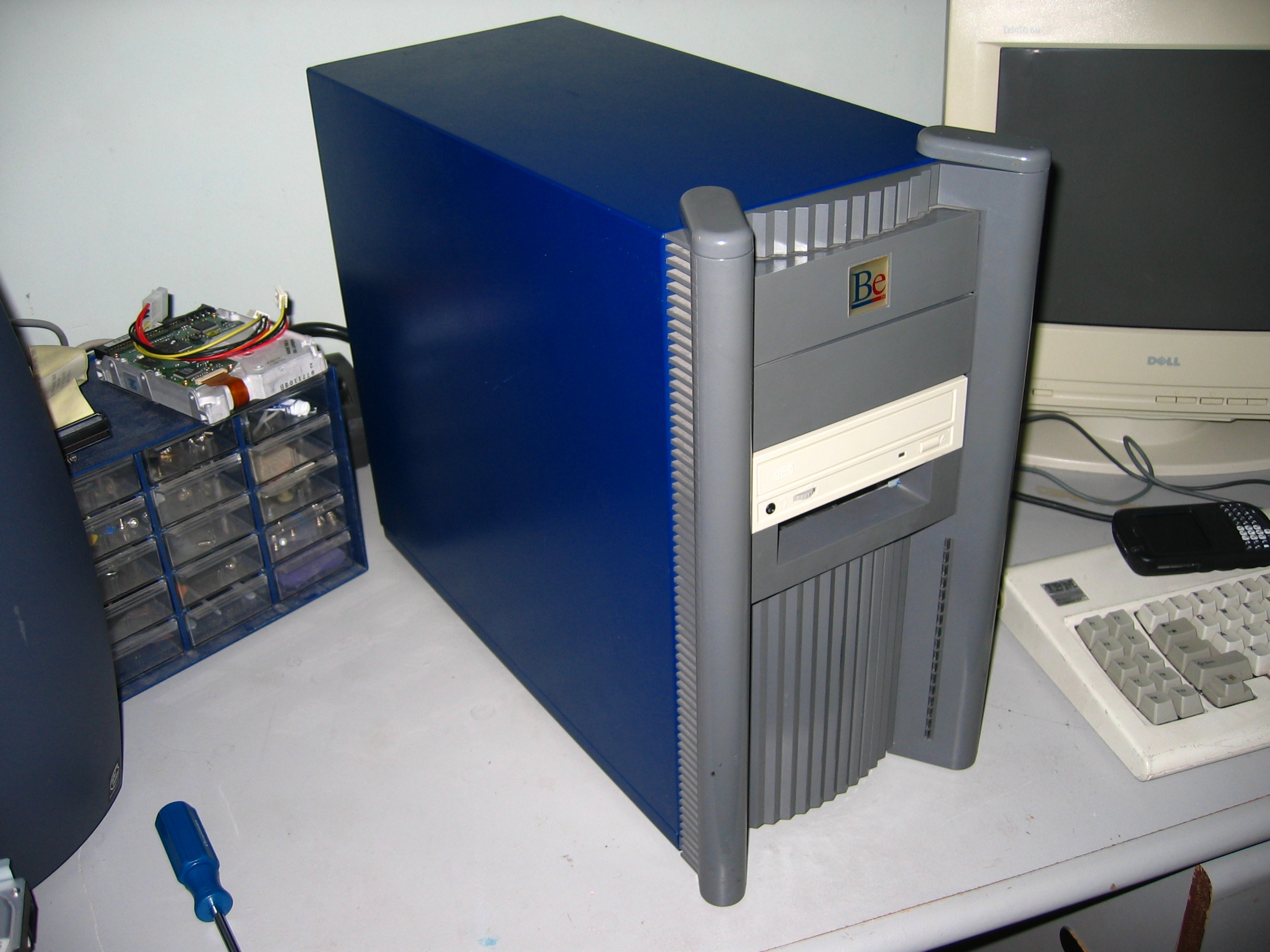
BeBox computer

In October 1995, the BeBox personal computer was released by Be, with its distinctive strips of lights along the front that indicate the activity of each PowerPC CPU, and the combined analogue/digital, 37-pin GeekPort. Due to its impressive power and showcase of multimedia applications, the BeBox received much attention at launch, especially by fans and enthusiasts of Amiga. The company's financial state was not very good after years of development, but in April 1996 managed to secure funding from "several leading Silicon Valley venture capital firms".

Toward the end of 1996, Apple Computer was still looking for a replacement to Copland in their operating system strategy. Amidst rumours of Apple's interest in purchasing BeOS, Be wanted to increase its user base, to try to convince software developers to write software for the operating system. Be courted Macintosh clone vendors to ship BeOS with their hardware, and Power Computing became a licensee in November 1996. Eventually, the two final options for Apple were BeOS and NeXTSTEP – NeXT was chosen and acquired due to the persuasive influence of Steve Jobs and the incomplete state of the BeOS product, criticized at the time for lacking such features as printing capability. It was rumoured that the deal fell apart because of money, with Be Inc allegedly wanting US$500M and a high-level post in the company, when the NeXT deal closed at US$400M. The rumours were dismissed by Gassée.

=== After BeBox ===
By the start of 1997, a combination of hardware and financial problems led to the discontinuation of BeBox and the company's exit from hardware to focus on software. The BeOS software started appearing on some Macintosh clones and was also later to Apple Computer's Power Macs despite resistance from Apple, due to the hardware specifications assistance of Power Computing. In 1998, Be acquired StarCode Software which developed the PackageBuilder and SoftwareValet software distribution tool for BeOS. The company also secured new funding, including from Intel which took a 10 percent stake (soon after BeOS was ported to Intel x86 platform). At the same time, the company received its first major partner manufacturer, Hitachi, to bundle BeOS on some of its products.

In July 1999, Be Inc. had an initial public offering, listed on Nasdaq. However the company continued to struggle with adoption, partly due to the agreements of most OEMs with Microsoft preventing the offering of BeOS. An anticipated deal with a "major OEM" later in 1999 did not materialize and led to a decline in its stock.

=== Change of focus ===
The company introduced the BeIA operating system in February 2000 with a declaration that Be Inc. would shift its focus to Internet appliances. Version 5 of BeOS was given away for free as a download, as BeOS could not take off in the market. At the event, Compaq and Hitachi announced that they would release devices running on BeIA.

Be managed to partner with consumer electronics giant Sony which adopted BeIA for its eVilla home internet appliance, unveiled at CES 2001. Be Inc.'s stock however had by 2001 declined sharply and there were reports that it would soon run out of cash.

Be Inc.'s logo from 1990 to 1999

=== Dissolution and litigation ===
The Be logo introduced in 1999

Be, Inc. announced on August 16, 2001, that Palm, Inc. would acquire the company for a sum of US$11 million. The deal was approved by Be's shareholders on November 13, at which point the company entered dissolution. CEO Gassée went to serve on the board of directors of Palm. Palm was not interested in the desktop operating system market; Palm subsequently spun off a wholly owned subsidiary PalmSource to develop its Palm OS and related software, with the Be assets being transferred to PalmSource. It likely used some BeOS code in Palm OS 6. PalmSource (and hence the rights of BeOS) was subsequently acquired by Japanese-based ACCESS.

The Be company (while under dissolution) initiated litigation against Microsoft for aggressively anti-competitive and monopolistic business practices. Joining a long history of antitrust lawsuits against Microsoft, Be specifically contested Microsoft's prohibition of OEMs to allow dual-boot systems containing both Microsoft and non-Microsoft operating systems, and that Compaq had been pressured not to market an Internet appliance in partnership with Be. Be also claimed that Microsoft acted to artificially depress Be Inc.'s initial public offering (IPO). The suit was settled out of court in September 2003 with a US$23.25 million payout to Be, Inc.

== Legacy ==
After Palm's acquisition of Be's assets, The Register wrote that Be shouldn't be viewed as a failure:

"The fact that the company survived for ten years – and through such dramatic shifts: taking it from being an independent workstation manufacturer, to an alternative Macintosh software platform, through to being an alternative x86 OS, and finally to being an embedded media appliance platform – without a discernible revenue stream is a testament to its engineering prowess, practicality and foresight. [..] For example, in its pomp Be Inc had only a sixth of the engineers of the Apple Copland project, and still managed to turn out a working operating system... and quite a good one, at that."

The open source operating system Haiku resumed BeOS's legacy in the form of a complete reimplementation. Beta 5 of Haiku was released in September 2024.
