= InfoGear =

InfoGear Technology Corporation
- Founded: November 1995; 30 years ago
- Defunct: 2000
- Fate: Acquired by Cisco
- Headquarters: California, U.S.
- Website: infogear.com at the Wayback Machine (archived 1998-06-13)

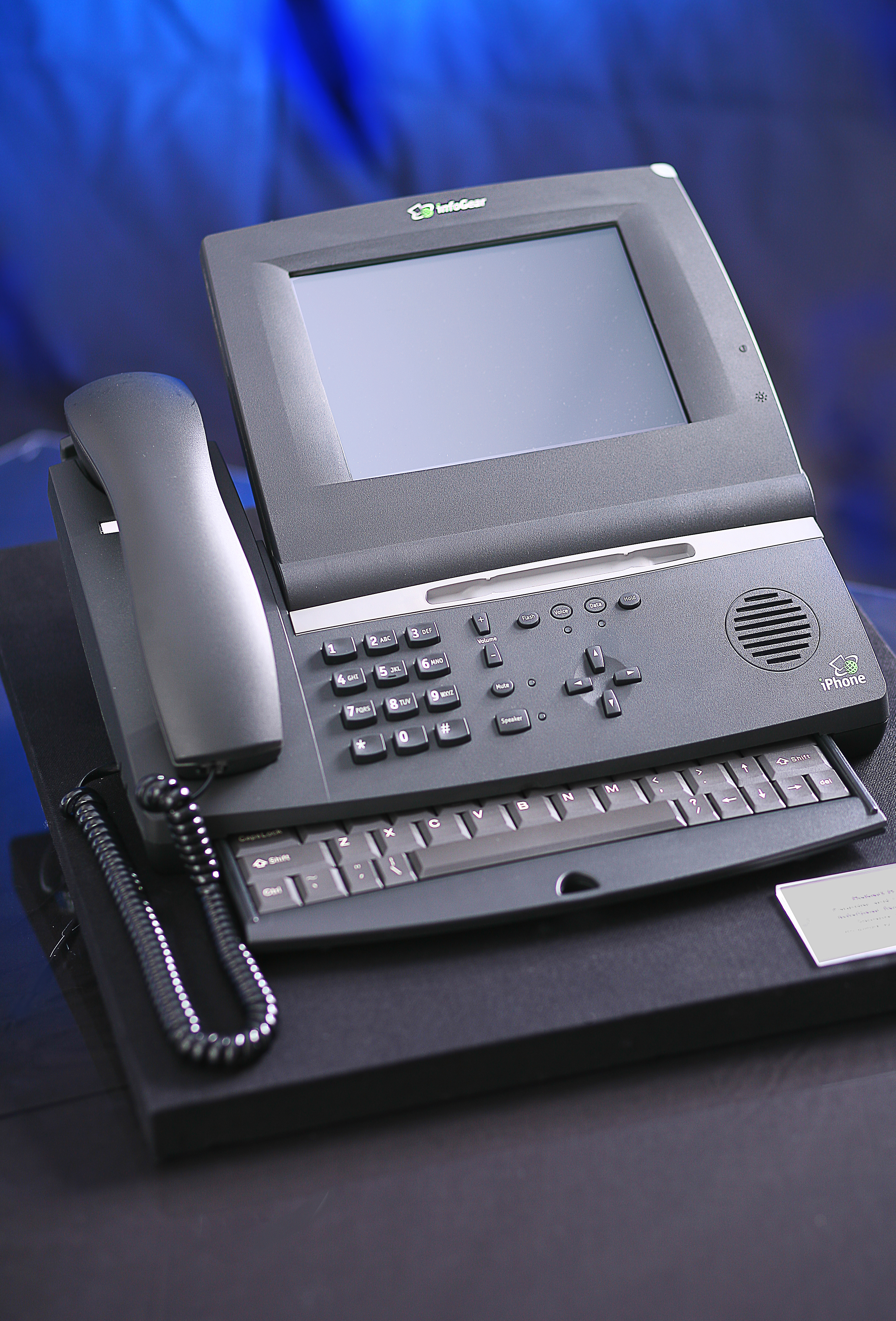

InfoGear Technology Corporation was an American information technology company founded in 1995. In 1998, it introduced the iPhone internet appliance. The company was acquired in 2000 by Cisco.

== Company history ==
The company's history can be divided into four distinct phases:

Phase 1 – May 1995 – The original iPhone product concept was developed as part of an internal innovation project at National Semiconductor – code named Project Mercury. Bob Ackerman, a strategy and technology consultant working with National Semiconductors’ Demetris Paraskevopoulos, first discovered the project in National's labs. Ackerman worked with his colleague Jeff Oscodar and the National team to spin the project out into a start-up company in 1995.

Phase 2 – 1995 - 1996 (Bob Marshall, CEO) - The company worked in partnership with CIDCO systems to introduce the first iPhone (CIDCO iPhone).

Phase 3 – 1997 – 2000 (Ed Cluss, CEO) - The company bought the iPhone II intellectual property from CIDCO and introduced the iPhone to the consumer market. It also explored the "J-Phone" concept, and ported InfoGear Networks to GSM mobile phones (code named Ducati).

Phase 4 - 2000 – Present – InfoGear was acquired by Cisco Systems on March 16, 2000. Cisco operated the InfoGear Network until later shutting it down.

== Products ==
=== iPhone ===
InfoGear had offices in California and an R&D center in Israel. InfoGear developed a line of Internet appliances, of which the best known was the Linksys iPhone, an Internet screenphone. The first-generation iPhone shipped in 1997 and the second in 1999. It was ultimately distributed in the United States, Australia, South Africa and New Zealand. The iPhone trademark was developed and owned by InfoGear.

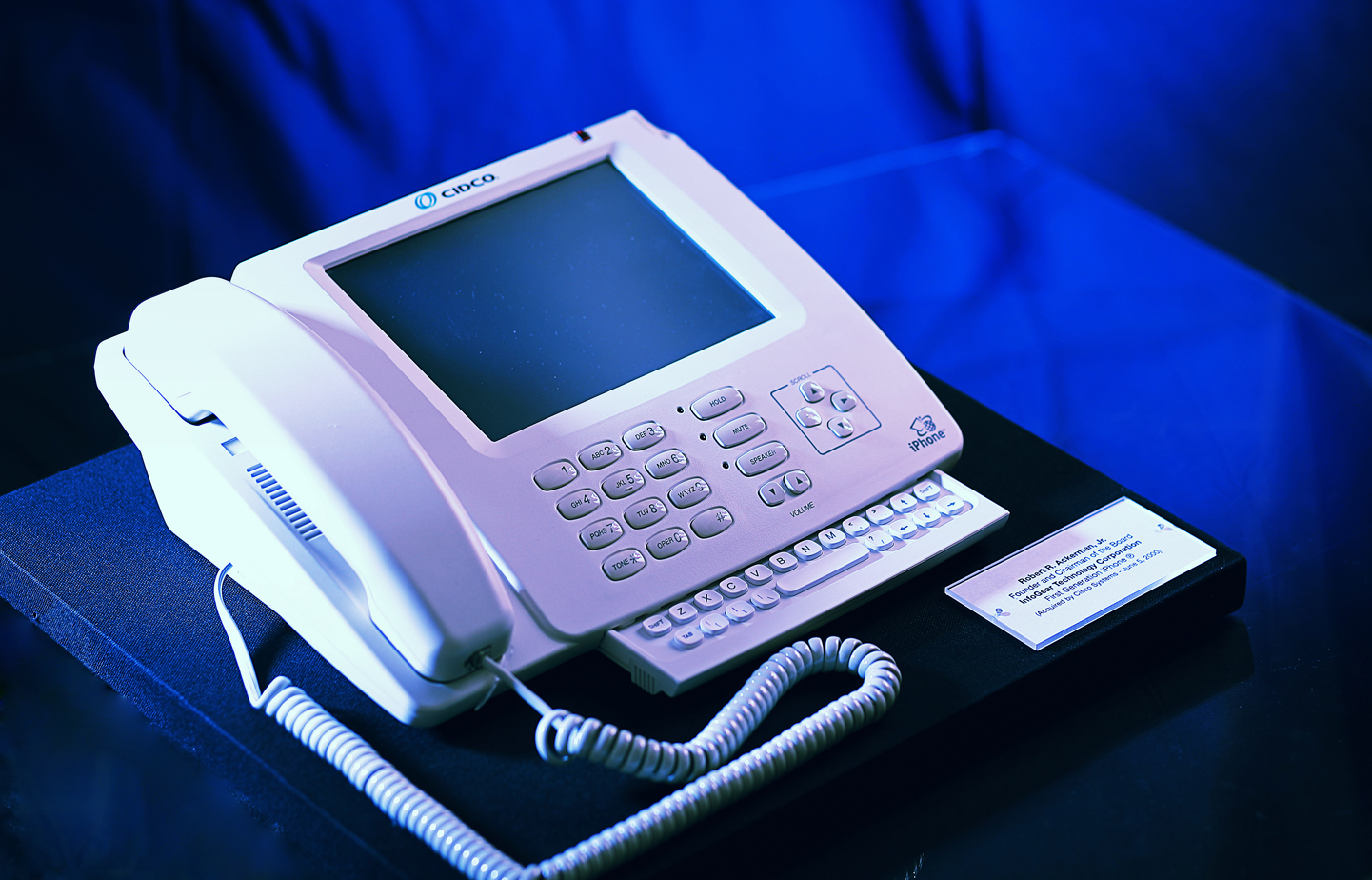

=== InfoGear Network ===
The Info Gear Network provided user-relevant information and services in conjunction with e-commerce, content and service partners.
