= Internet appliance =

Consumer device to access the Internet

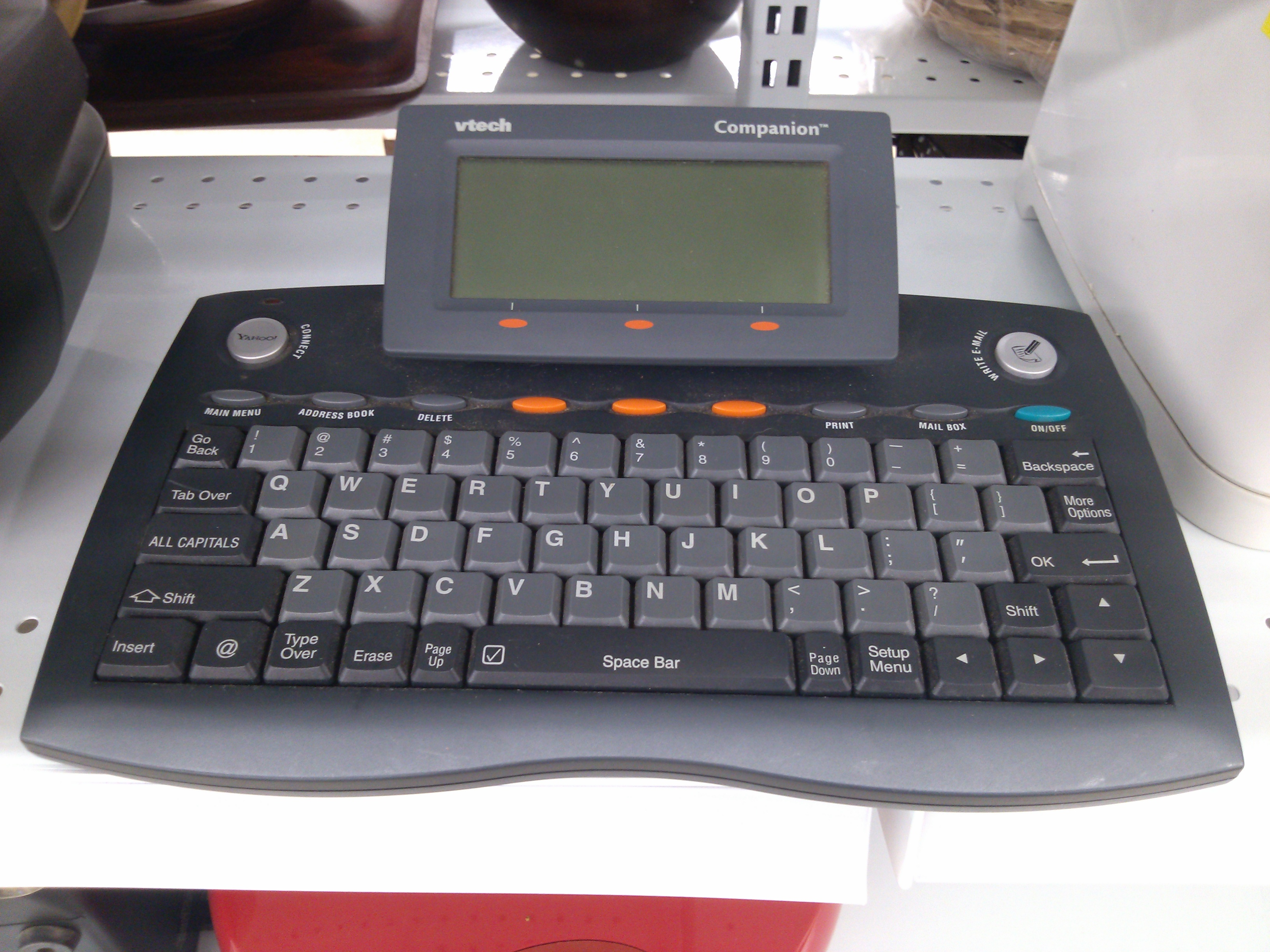
A VTech Model 80-36447, a type of Internet Appliance. Note the button on the console that would link the user to the Yahoo! webportal.

An Internet appliance is a consumer device whose main function is easy access to Internet services such as WWW or e-mail. The term was popularized in the 1990s, when it somewhat overlapped in meaning with an information appliance, desktop computer, network computer, or even thin client, but now it has fallen out of general use.

Internet appliances were contrasted with any general purpose computer, but unlike personal computers, internet appliances were low cost and low margin products, usually using highly optimised low power silicon specifically built for internet use. Modern smart phones and tablet computers do approximately the same things, but are more powerful, more successful in the market, and generally not classified as Internet appliances.

== History ==
Internet appliances were promoted by a variety of technology companies during the 1990s but, as the price of full-featured computers dropped, never met the market expectations. Jim Louderback would later describe the concept as one of the "eight biggest tech flops ever".

An Internet tablet is a type of a mobile Internet appliance. Examples include the Sony Airboard and the Nokia Internet Tablet series (including the Nokia N900).

Early in the 21st century a new breed of household devices, such as Vonage Internet Phones, PenguinRadio's Internet radio, and IPTV boxes, began to use the broadband connections in PC-independent ways.

== Notable devices ==
=== Current ===
- aigo MID
- Chromebook
- Litl Webbook
- MailBug
- Personal Internet Communicator

=== Discontinued ===
- 3Com Audrey
- Amstrad E-mailer
- CIDCo Mivo/MailStation
- Compaq
- ePod
- GlobalPC
- i-Opener
- MSN Companion
- MSN TV
- New Internet Computer
- Nokia 770 Internet Tablet
- Nokia N800
- Nokia N810
- Nokia N900
- Pepper Pad
- Sony Airboard
- Sony eVilla
- Sony Mylo
- Virgin Webplayer
- VTech Companion

== See also ==
- Computer appliance
- Ubiquitous computing
- Mobile Internet Device (MID)
- Server appliance
- Netbook
