= BeBox =

Personal computer sold by Be Inc.

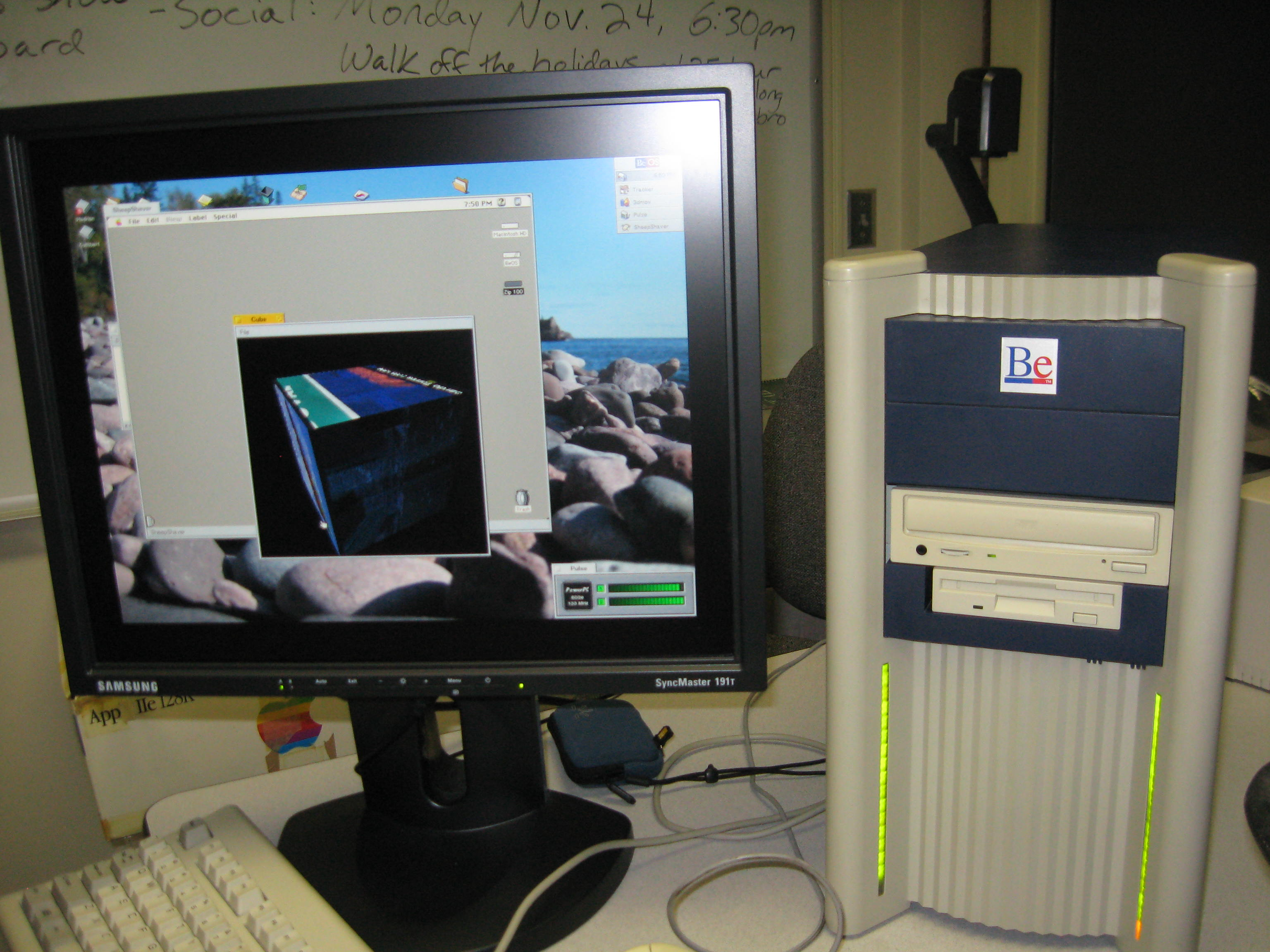
- BeBox (right) with an aftermarket monitor
- Manufacturer: Be Inc.
- Type: Workstation
- Released: October 3, 1995; 31 years ago
- Introductory price: US$1,600 (equivalent to $3,380 in 2025)
- Discontinued: January 1997; 29 years ago
- Units sold: 1,800
- Operating system: BeOS
- CPU: 2× PowerPC 603 @ 66 MHz; 2× PowerPC 603e @ 133 MHz
- Memory: Up to 256 MB (Up to eight 72-pin SIMMs)
- Dimensions: 15.68 × 8.28 × 18.15 in (39.8 × 21.0 × 46.1 cm)

The BeBox is a discontinued workstation developed by Be Inc. to run the company's operating system, later named BeOS. It features two PowerPC processors, a custom input/output port called the GeekPort, and front-panel LED arrays known as "blinkenlights".

== History ==
The BeBox originated as the Be Machine, an experimental computer developed by Be Inc. The BeBox prototypes used two 25 MHz AT&T Hobbit processors and three AT&T 9308S digital signal processors.

The production BeBox debuted in October 1995 with two 66 MHz PowerPC 603 processors. In August 1996, Be introduced a revised model with two 133 MHz PowerPC 603e processors, designated the BeBox Dual603e-133. Its introductory price was US$2,995 (equivalent to $6,150 in 2025).

Be halted BeBox production in January 1997 after porting BeOS to the Macintosh. The company shifted its focus to developing software rather than manufacturing hardware.

== Hardware ==
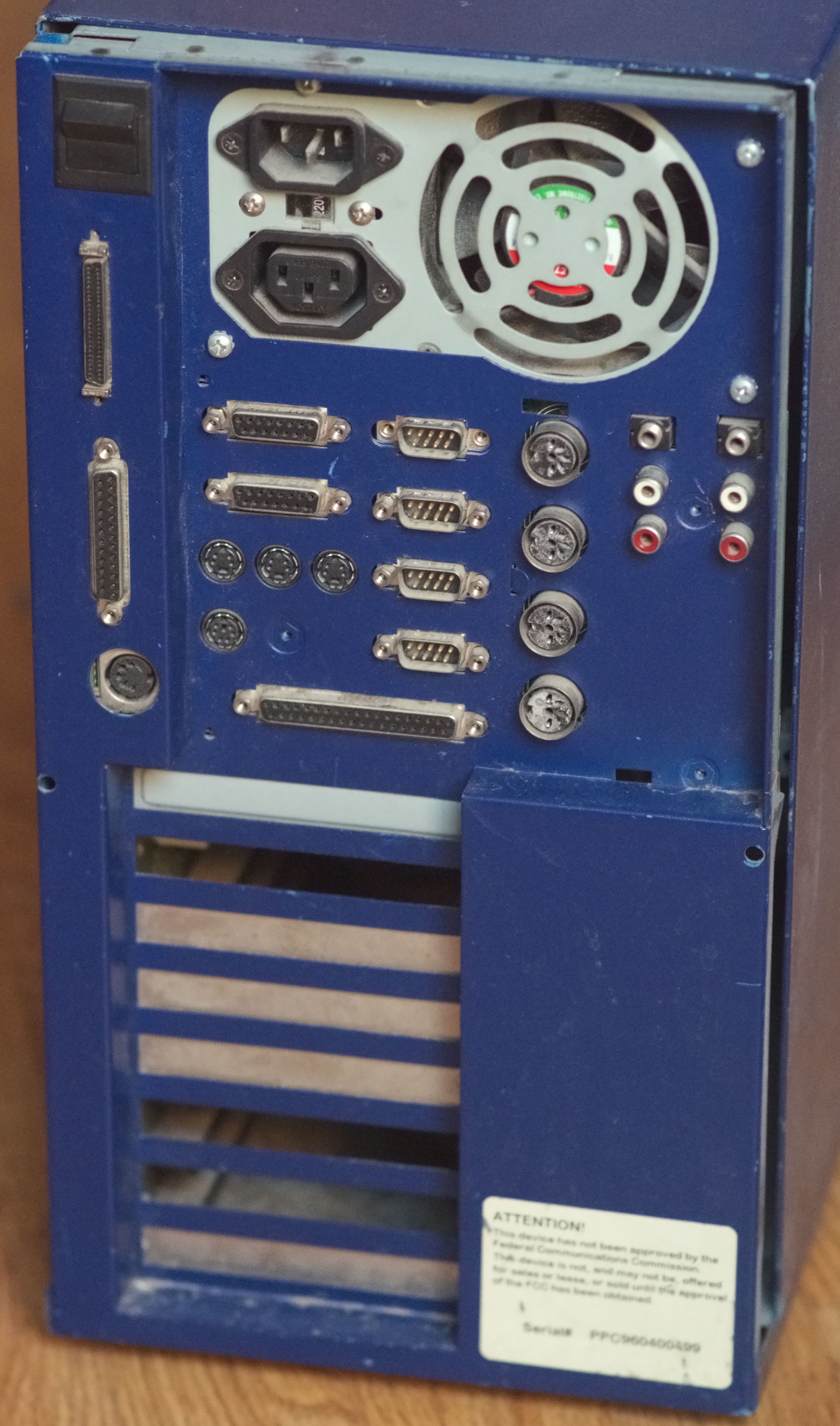
The BeBox's rear connectors

=== Processors ===
Production BeBoxes used two PowerPC processors:

- Two 66 MHz PowerPC 603 processors in the original model
- Two 133 MHz PowerPC 603e processors in the revised model

Prototypes with two 200 MHz processors and others with four processors were also developed, but were not made publicly available.

=== Mainboard ===
The BeBox mainboard uses the AT form factor, which was commonly used in IBM PC-compatible computers. Be used standard PC components to reduce manufacturing costs.

The mainboard includes:

- Two PowerPC 603 or 603e processors
- Eight 72-pin SIMM memory sockets
- 128 KB of flash ROM
- Three PCI expansion slots
- Five ISA expansion slots
- Internal SCSI and IDE connectors
- Internal floppy disk connector
- External SCSI-2 connector
- Parallel port
- AT-style keyboard port
- Three fuses for the GeekPort
- Connectors for the I/O board and front panel
- Power connector

=== I/O board ===
The BeBox I/O board provides several ports for peripheral devices and audio equipment. Its external connectors include four nine-pin D-sub serial ports, a PS/2 mouse port, two 15-pin joystick ports, and four DIN MIDI ports (two inputs and two outputs).

Audio connections include stereo pairs of RCA connectors for line-level input and output, along with 3.5 mm stereo jacks for microphone input and headphone output. Internal connectors provide connections for CD audio playback, microphone input, and headphone output. The stereo audio system uses a 16-bit digital-to-analog converter and supports sampling rates of 44.1 and 48 kHz.

The board also includes three four-pin mini-DIN ports for infrared input and output.

==== GeekPort ====
The GeekPort is a 37-pin D-sub connector designed for experimental electronics and hardware development. Connected to the ISA bus, it provides digital and analog input/output (I/O) signals and direct-current power. Three fuses on the mainboard protect its electrical connections.

Its connections include:

- Two independent bidirectional eight-bit digital ports
- Four analog input pins connected to a 12-bit analog-to-digital converter
- Four analog output pins connected to an eight-bit digital-to-analog converter
- Two signal ground reference pins
- Power connections providing +5 V, +12 V, and −12 V, along with seven ground pins

== Blinkenlights ==
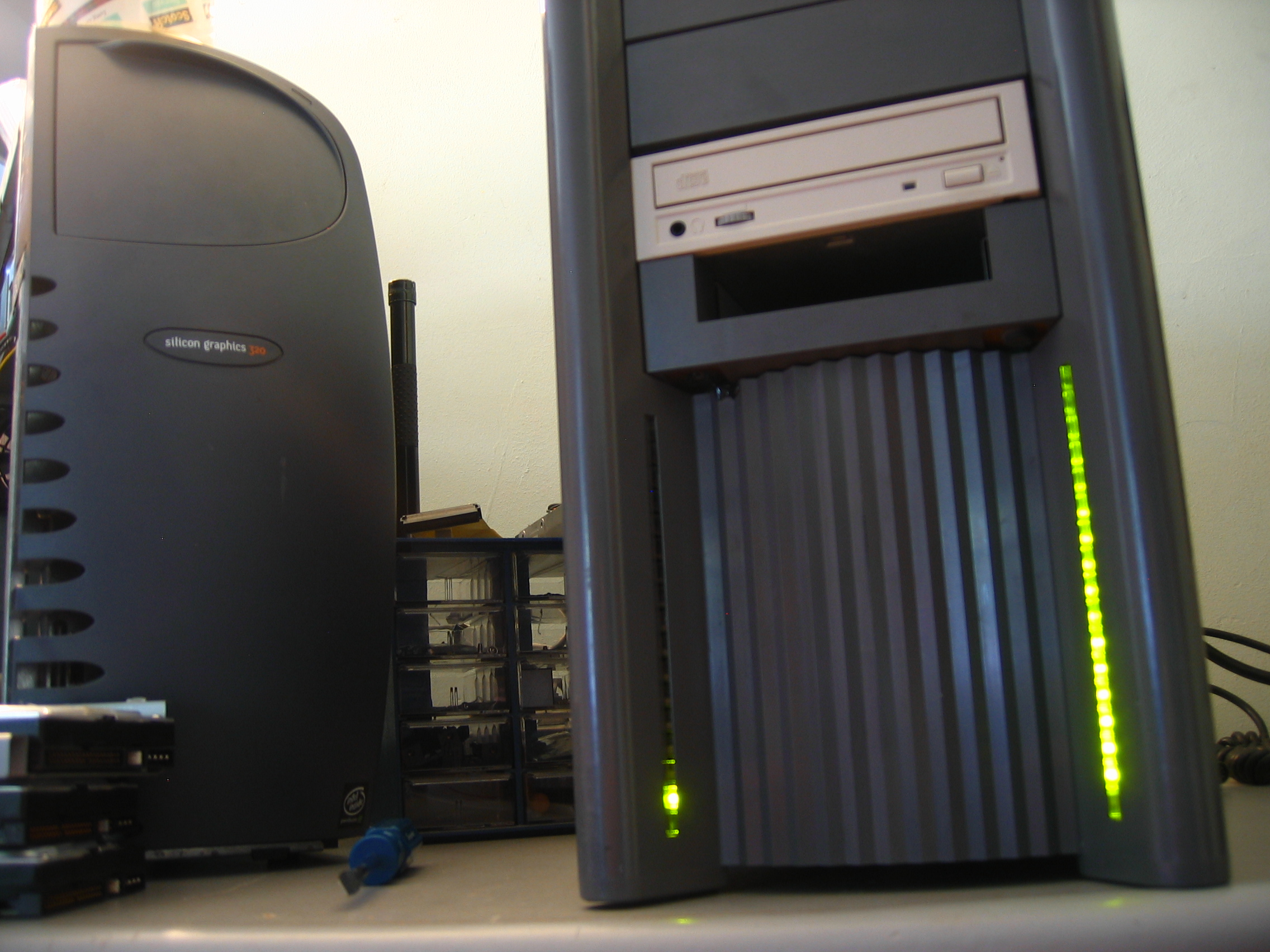
The BeBox's front-panel LED arrays

Two vertical arrays of yellow and green LEDs, nicknamed "blinkenlights", are built into the front bezel. They display the activity of the two CPUs, with each array corresponding to one processor. The bottommost LED in the right-hand array indicates hard disk activity.

== Software ==
The BeBox was developed specifically to run Be's operating system, initially called BeOS. Its dual-processor architecture was intended to support operating-system features such as preemptive multitasking and symmetric multiprocessing.

The BeBox was also the original PowerPC development target for Plan 9.

In 1996, Be Inc. and Craftworks Solutions announced an agreement to bring Be_Linux, a Linux-based operating system developed by Craftworks, to the BeBox.

== Market ==
BeBox creator Jean-Louis Gassée did not envision the computer as a general-purpose consumer product. In a September 1996 interview, he said that users should have some programming experience, identifying C++ as the standard language for the system.

== See also ==
- Multi Emulator Super System (MESS) – able to emulate both BeBox 66 and 133
