= David R. Heise =

American psychologist (1937–2021)

- Born: March 15, 1937; Evanston, Illinois, USA
- Died: September 28, 2021 (aged 84)

Academic background
- Education: University of Missouri; University of Chicago

Academic work
- Discipline: Social psychologist
- Institutions: Indiana University; University of Wisconsin; Queens College, CUNY; University of North Carolina
- Notable ideas: Affect control theory

David Reuben Jerome Heise (March 15, 1937 – September 28, 2021) was a social psychologist who originated the idea that affectual processes control interpersonal behavior. He contributed to both quantitative and qualitative methodology in sociology. He retired from undergraduate teaching in 2002, but continued research and graduate student consulting as Rudy Professor of Sociology Emeritus at Indiana University. He was most well known for his work on affect control theory.

== Biography ==
Heise was born in Evanston, Illinois. He attended Illinois Institute of Technology from 1954 to 1956, and then transferred to the University of Missouri School of Journalism where he received a B.J. degree in 1958. Additionally he received an A.B. in Mathematics and the Physical Sciences from the University of Missouri in 1959. Heise joined the Laboratories for Applied Sciences at the University of Chicago, on the non-public top floor of the Museum of Science and Industry, as a technical writer. His first publication was a by-lined full page report in the Chicago Sun-Times concerning a 1960 high-temperature physics conference held by the Laboratories.

After beginning graduate courses related to communications studies in 1961, Heise's interests generalized to social psychology, and he became a fellow in a National Institute of Mental Health (NIMH) training program directed by University of Chicago sociologist Fred Strodtbeck. While a graduate student in the University of Chicago Sociology Department (the Chicago School), he studied with Elihu Katz, James A. Davis, Peter Blau, Edward Shils, Otis Dudley Duncan, Peter Rossi, and Leo Goodman. He received his M.A. in 1962 and his Ph.D. in 1964.

From 1963 to 1969, Heise served as instructor, post-doctoral fellow, and assistant professor at the University of Wisconsin–Madison. He worked for two years as an associate professor at Queens College, City University of New York, where his colleague Patricia Kendall linked him to her husband Paul Lazarsfeld. From 1971 to 1981 he was professor of sociology at the University of North Carolina at Chapel Hill, where he directed an NIMH training program in sociological methodology, and began his signature research on affect control theory. After joining the sociology department at Indiana University in 1981, he directed another NIMH training program in methodology from 1988 to 1993, and was awarded a James H. Rudy Endowed Professorship in 1990.

Heise died on September 28, 2021, after a brief illness.

== Impression Formation and Affect Control ==
Heise worked extensively with Charles E. Osgood's semantic differential for measuring affective associations of words (connotative meanings). His dissertation included semantic differential measurements for 1,000 frequent English words, and he and his students compiled four more lexicons in the United States since then, each containing affective measurements for 1,250 or more English words. Heise used the affective measurements to begin quantitative studies of impression formation while at the University of Wisconsin. The impression formation research seeks empirically based equations for predicting how various kinds of events influence individuals' feelings about people, behaviors, and settings. This research employs structural equation modeling and path analysis (statistics), as discussed by Heise in his book Causal Analysis. In 1978 Heise reported research results regarding affective meanings and impression formation in Computer-Assisted Analysis of Social Action. An account of similar work over the prior century was provided in his 2010 book Surveying Cultures.

At the University of North Carolina, Heise began work on affect control theory, a cybernetic approach to impression management through interpersonal action. An oral presentation of the theory was given in 1972, an article on the theory was published in 1977, and a book, Understanding Events, appeared in 1979. NIMH research funding during the late 1970s supported data collection for a variety of graduate student projects related to affect control theory. The results of these projects were reported in a book, Analyzing Social Interaction, edited by Heise and his student Lynn Smith-Lovin. After Heise moved to Indiana University, he and his students, and others, continued work on impression formation and on affect control theory. Heise expanded methods for measuring affective meanings to computer-assisted personal interviewing. He prepared programs in the Java programming language to collect data over the Internet, and to publish his computer simulation system for obtaining and examining predictions from affect control theory on the World Wide Web. Heise summarized the multiple lines of research on affect control theory, delineated the theory's mathematical model, and provided a readable introduction to the theory in his 2007 book, Expressive Order. He has discussed how affect control theory's computational model of emotional facial expressions can facilitate the creation of emoting machines (affective computing).

Affect control theory (ACT) has been acclaimed both by sociologists and psychologists. Thomas Fararo discussed the theory as follows. "Heise employs a control system model. The basic idea is that momentary affective states are under the control of more enduring sentiments. His 'fundamental sentiments' are instantiations of operative ideals, whereas his momentary affective meaning states are the results of read inputs. These are compared with the fundamental sentiments from moment to moment in the affect control process. Behavior is the control of affect via the feedback loop. Undoubtedly this is the best developed empirically applicable cybernetic model in the history of theoretical sociology."

In an essay on the sociology of emotions, T. David Kemper wrote, "Indubitably, Heise has the most methodologically rigorous program of all sociologists, with the added attraction of its mathematical precision. ... Using the cultural meanings of its constituent terms, and combinations of terms, as the raw materials, ACT is, if nothing else, a simulation program par excellence. It can formulate both emotional outcomes of situations and situational outcomes of emotions in a manner that is more efficient than any other presently available in either sociology or psychology."

Psychologists Gerald Clore and Jesse Pappas discussed affect control theory as follows. "Ideas about settings, identities, actions, and emotions are part of the fabric of sociology and social psychology. Innumerable theories offer explanations for how subsets of these elements are related in particular contexts, but in lieu of such a piecemeal approach, Heise offers a general explanation for the entire set of relationships. His account, moreover, is formalized in equations and implemented in a computer program capable of making numerical predictions about ongoing human interactions. This is an astounding achievement. By comparison, the rest of us work on modest problems with blunt instruments."

== Event Structure Analysis ==
At Indiana University Heise began a second program of research on interpersonal action, this one emphasizing rationality rather than affect. Building on production systems in cognitive science, especially as applied by other sociologists, Heise developed a framework called Event Structure Analysis for analyzing reiterative social processes. The approach posits that later events are linked logically to earlier events in networks of prerequisite implications, and that narratives about incidents implicitly communicate this underlying logical structure. The analytic problem is to draw the implicit logical structure out of the narrative into an explicit model characterizing the incident and similar happenings. Heise proposed having culture experts accomplish this by judging which events in a given narrative were prerequisites for others. However, judging logical priority for all pairs of events in a lengthy narrative would be overwhelming, so Heise created a computer program to elicit answers, to process prior answers logically in order to minimize queries, and to draw a graphical representation of the logical network that implicitly underlies the analyzed narrative.

The computer program has been applied by sociological ethnographers, social historians, and organization researchers. Event structure analysis is an important part of the growing field of social sequence analysis.

== Macrosociology contributions ==
With Gerhard Lenski and John Wardwell, Heise published a quantitative analysis of sociocultural evolution. With student Alex Durig, Heise developed the concept of macroaction for analyzing organizational processes. Student Steven Lerner and Heise demonstrated that international interactions have a substantial affective basis. An empirical basis for analyzing semantic networks in order to identify major social institutions and their constituent roles was developed in a book by Heise and Neil MacKinnon, The approach was applied with multi-method analyses to identify the major social institutions of contemporary American society in Heise's book Cultural Meanings and Social Institutions: Social Organization Through Language.

== Honors and offices ==
Heise was a Guggenheim Fellow in 1977, and a research fellow of the Japan Society for the Promotion of Science in 1990. He served as editor of Sociological Methodology from 1974 to 1976, and as editor of Sociological Methods & Research from 1980 to 1983. Heise was chair of the Microcomputing Section of the American Sociological Association (ASA) in 1990 and 1991, and he was chair of the ASA's Mathematical Sociology Section in 2003 and 2004. He received the Microcomputing Section's Award for Outstanding Contributions to Computing in 1995. The ASA's Social Psychology Section gave him its Cooley-Mead Award in 1998, the Sociology of Emotions Section gave him its Lifetime Achievement Award in 2002, and the Mathematical Sociology Section gave him both its James S. Coleman Distinguished Career Award and its Harrison White Outstanding Book Award in 2010. The International Academy for Intercultural Research presented him with its Lifetime Achievement Award in 2013. In 2017 the ASA's Section on Methodology recognized Heise's contributions to sociological methodology with its Paul F. Lazarsfeld Award.
