= Mind reading computers =

Mind reading computers may refer to:

- Computers that can perform telepathy in science fiction
- Affective computing
- Brain–computer interfaces
