= Affective design =

Design focused on emotional responses

Affective design describes the design of products, services, and user interfaces that aim to evoke intended emotional responses from consumers, ultimately improving customer satisfaction. It is often regarded within the domain of technology interaction and computing, in which emotional information is communicated to the computer from the user in a natural and comfortable way. The computer processes the emotional information and adapts or responds to try to improve the interaction in some way. The notion of affective design emerged from the field of human–computer interaction (HCI), specifically from the developing area of affective computing. Affective design serves an important role in user experience (UX) as it contributes to the improvement of the user's personal condition in relation to the computing system. Decision-making, brand loyalty, and consumer connections have all been associated with the integration of affective design. The goals of affective design focus on providing users with an optimal, proactive experience. Amongst overlap with several fields, applications of affective design include ambient intelligence, human–robot interaction, and video games.

== Background ==
Emotions are an integral part of the human experience, and thus, play a role in how users and consumers interact with interfaces and products. Donald Norman, an academic in the field of human-centered design, explored the importance of emotion in design, coining the concept of user-centered design in the 1980s. He discussed design heuristics and advocated for providing users with a pleasurable experience through the application of emotional design. According to Norman, there are three levels of emotional processing that influence the user’s affective experience: visceral design, behavioural design, and reflective design.

- Visceral design relates to the immediate, subconscious responses to a product. It is triggered by an object’s perceptual properties and sensory experiences, such as the use of specific shapes or colours. Visceral level responses are rooted in biological and evolutionary processes that facilitate rapid assessment of encountered objects, including evaluations of their safety and the scope for further exploration. Product designers utilise visceral level responses to create positive user experiences by incorporating elements such as specific imagery, colour, typography, or branding to convey the desired emotional state or association to the user.
- Behavioural design is related to the joy and effectiveness of use of a given product, particularly in terms of functionality and understandability. It is also affected by the physical feel of an object, such as its weight or texture. Effective behavioural design is intuitive and meets the user’s expectations and goals, as well as instils a sense of control over the product in the consumer. Behavioural design, while subconscious, is closely related to the users’ past experiences, where the expectations for a given product originate.
- Reflective design is considered the highest level of emotional design, where the affective response stems from conscious mental processing. At this level, users reflect upon their experience with the product and how it affects their self-image. Reflective design is largely embedded within a social and cultural context, as consumers assess the social role or status communicated by using the product, particularly in light of cultural norms and preferences. Reflective design is also linked to customer retention, marking the stage where the decision to reuse the product in the future is made.

To cater to all three levels of emotional responses, designers should consider both a product’s appearance and its usability.

Bødker, Christensen, and Jørgensen presented a definition of affective design that emphasizes the importance of considering current social and cultural influences when relating to human emotions.

Along with the growth of human-computer interaction, the past few decades have seen an increase in the discussion of emotions in relation to design. Research in recent years has looked at what affects our emotions as well as how emotions affect our mental and physical states. Additionally, designers and researchers have explored how to elicit and map people’s emotions, ranging from positive to negative. Affective design encompasses more than the functionality of a product as it emphasizes user experience and is concerned with the dynamics of how humans interact with the world.

Affective design includes utilizing users’ emotions as data to guide technologies’ responses in addition to designing with predetermined elements intended to influence users’ emotions. The growth in the number and diversity of users carries with it the challenge to tailor interfaces and products to each individual. Affective design offers the potential to provide a unique, adaptive response to each user’s emotion. It has emerged as an intersection of functionality and pleasure, illustrating the significant influence of emotional components in technology and user experiences.

== Aims ==
Affective computing aims to construct affective interfaces which are capable of providing certain emotional experiences for users. Affective design attempts to understand the emotional relationships between users and products as well as how products communicate affectively through their physical features. It aims to create artefacts capable of eliciting the most pleasurable experience possible for users, across all of their senses. Affective design works to create the optimal user experience by tailoring human-interactions to individual users in response to their emotional input. It promotes affective interaction through communication, positioning itself as a mediator between human input and the computer's output. The effectiveness of affective design is measured with reference to feeling discrepancy, which defines the disparity between the target customer's emotional response and the actual emotions experienced by the user. Design that generates low feeling discrepancy is regarded as impactful affective design.

Another aim of affective design is increasing customer retention by creating memorable user experiences and ensuring brand loyalty. The integration of affective design and the subsequent emotional response elicited in customers has been shown to positively impact attachment, loyalty, and long-term commitment to the brand. This aim of affective design is grounded in the experience economy theory, suggesting that consumer engagement should occur at the emotional level. By creating positive affective responses, brands generate memorable experiences for product users, improving commercial success. This leads to positive sale-driving behaviours in consumers, such as spreading positive word-of-mouth, price insensitivity, and repurchasing.

== Challenges ==
The key challenge for affective design involves accurately identifying the user's affective needs, and, subsequently, the design of products that would address those needs. Current research focuses on the measurement and analysis of human interactions towards affective design and the assessment of the corresponding affective design features.

Another challenge for affective design is balancing the emotional and utilitarian aspects of product design. Prioritising emotional value over usability can affect users’ satisfaction with a given product if it fails to meet their functional expectations. Conversely, the overemphasis on product functionality can detract from an emotionally positive experience, leading to decreased memorability of use and brand loyalty. Therefore, effective design should encompass both product functionality and generate positive affective responses to create an optimal user experience.

Notably, while striking a balance between usability and affective design is important, generating strong emotional responses has been found to mitigate some negative experiences stemming from a lack of functionality. According to Norman, customer satisfaction at the emotional level often transcends functional inconveniences, and positive reflective memories can mitigate the negative effect of the initial experience. Emotion-centered design has also been found to have a more significant impact on a product’s success than its functionality. One example is the introduction of the colourful casing to Apple’s iMac, which, by appealing to the visceral level of emotional processing, improved the product’s sales despite the hardware components remaining mostly unchanged.

Direct measures of users’ emotional states present another challenge for affective design. Products and interfaces that incorporate affective computing into their design, specifically to create user experiences that adapt to the emotional state of the user, often rely on indirect measures, such as physiological arousal. However, the use of biological markers, such as heart rate, blood pressure, or respiratory rate, only provides an indirect measure of affective states, which can be influenced by various external factors.

== Applications ==
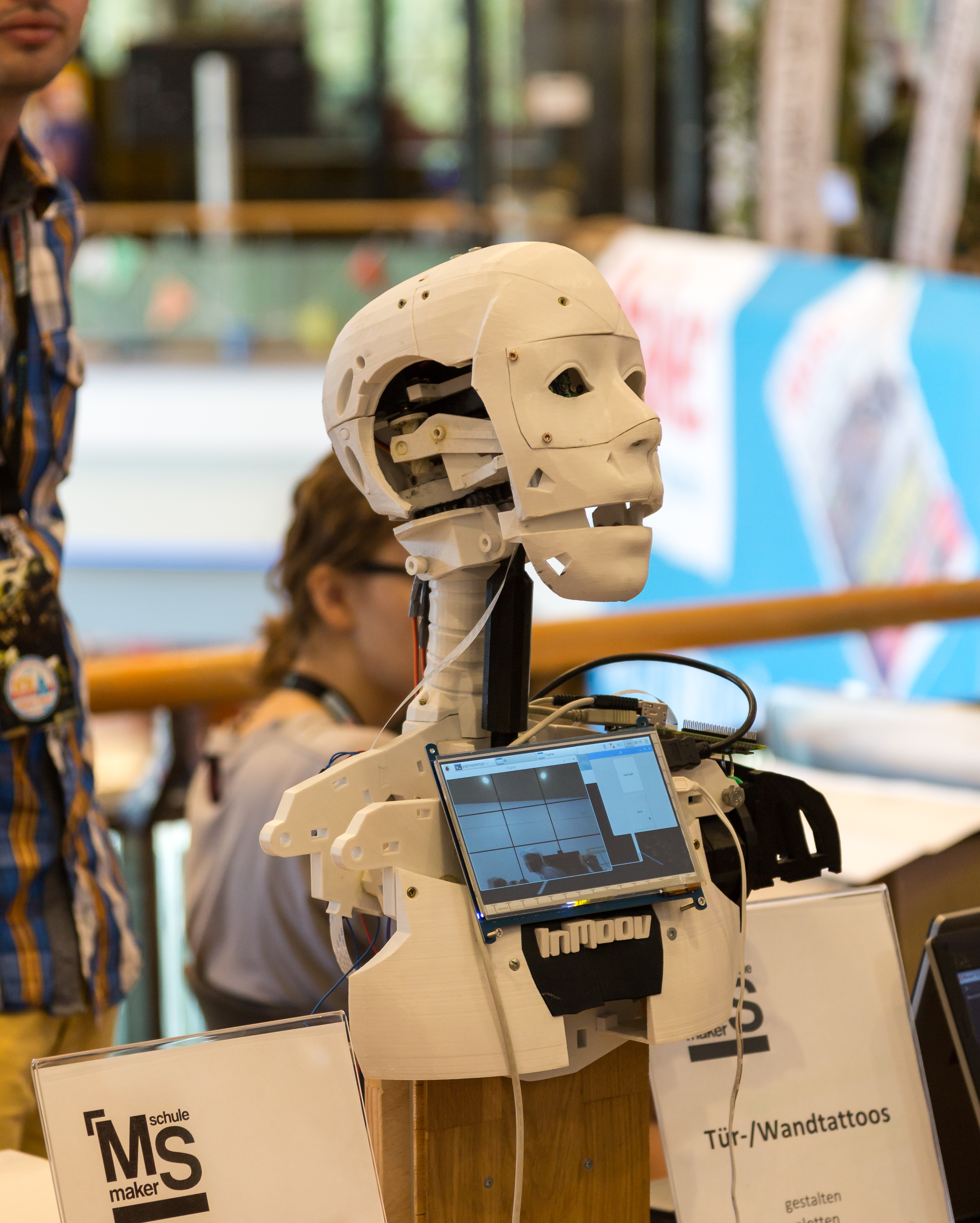
Emotion Stimulating Robot

Ambient intelligence (AmI) involves a variety of processes, including aspects of affective design, to construct systems that proactively interact with the user. It incorporates areas from computer science and engineering, including sensors, human-computer interfaces, and artificial intelligence, to construct an adaptive, intelligent user environment. Collecting information from the environment and calculating the user’s anticipated needs, AmI lies at the intersection of the Internet of things and artificial intelligence . Applying affective design, AmI considers human desires and emotional responses. One way AmI processes human emotions is through facial expressions, which allows the technology to recognize user emotions and respond accordingly. These electronic environments provide the users with an aesthetic and pleasurable experience by enhancing human-product interactions.

Human–robot interaction is another area in which affective design is applied, specifically with emotional robots. Recognizing human emotions, emotional robots are aware of the user’s emotions and engage in an emotional interaction with the user. Emotional robots are designed to mimic human emotions and cognition. They analyze the user’s emotions by gathering data through various methods, including facial recognition, body language, and physiological signals, and then they exhibit a behavioral response. One example of an emotional robot is Erica, developed by Hiroshi Ishiguro and his team at Osaka University. Erica is an intelligent robot capable of carrying out a conversation with people and expressing emotions.

Video games serve as an immersive form of entertainment that can apply affective design in their development. Emotions impact the user’s engagement and relationship with the video game, prompting designers to consider affective design in their creation of video games. Affective gaming, for example, explores how video games can analyze the player's emotions and change game features accordingly. This has the potential to increase the personalization and adaptability of the games with the intention to increase user interest and commitment. It has been recognised as a potential solution to the issue of games providing an unbalanced player experience, often oscillating between excessively difficult and overly simplistic gameplay. Researchers suggest that game adaptability can also play a crucial role in facilitating a state of flow in players, which has been considered an integral part of enjoyable gaming experiences. Biofeedback and physiological arousal measures have been suggested as tools for games to adapt the gameplay, thus increasing player satisfaction by minimising frustration and maintaining an optimal level of challenge.

== See also ==
- Affective computing
- Human–computer interaction
- User-centered design
- User experience design
