= Character computing =

Field of research

Character computing is a trans-disciplinary field of research at the intersection of computer science and psychology. It is any computing that incorporates the human character within its context. Character is defined as all features or characteristics defining an individual and guiding their behavior in a specific situation. It consists of stable trait markers (e.g., personality, background, history, socio-economic embeddings, culture,...) and variable state markers (emotions, health, cognitive state, ...). Character computing aims at providing a holistic psychologically driven model of human behavior. It models and predicts behavior based on the relationships between a situation and character. Three main research modules fall under the umbrella of character computing: character sensing and profiling, character-aware adaptive systems, and artificial characters.

== Overview ==
Character computing can be viewed as an extension of the well-established field of affective computing. Based on the foundations of the different psychology branches, it advocates defining behavior as a compound attribute that is not driven by either personality, emotions, situation or cognition alone. It rather defines behavior as a function of everything that makes up an individual i.e., their character and the situation they are in. Affective computing aims at allowing machines to understand and translate the non-verbal cues of individuals into affect. Accordingly, character computing aims at understanding the character attributes of an individual and the situation to translate it to predicted behavior, and vice versa.

''In practical terms, depending on the application context, character computing is a branch of research that deals with the design of systems and interfaces that can observe, sense, predict, adapt to, affect, understand, or simulate the following: character based on behavior and situation, behavior based on character and situation, or situation based on character and behavior.'' The Character-Behavior-Situation (CBS) triad is at the core of character computing and defines each of the three edges based on the other two.

Character computing relies on simultaneous development from a computational and psychological perspective and is intended to be used by researchers in both fields. Its main concept is aligning the computational model of character computing with empirical results from in-lab and in-the-wild psychology experiments. The model is to be continuously built and validated through the emergence of new data. Similar to affective and personality computing, the model is to be used as a base for different applications towards improving user experience.

== History ==
Character computing as such was first coined in its first workshop in 2017. Since then it has had 3 international workshops and numerous publications. Despite its young age, it has already drawn some interest in the research community, leading to the publication of the first book under the same title in early 2020 published by Springer Nature.

Research that can be categorized under the field dates much older than 2017. The notion of combining several factors towards the explanation of behavior or traits and states has long been investigated in both Psychology and Computer Science, for example.

== Character ==
The word character originates from the Greek word meaning “stamping tool”, referring to distinctive features and traits. Over the years it has been given many different connotations, like the moral character in philosophy, the temperament in psychology, a person in literature or an avatar in various virtual worlds, including video games. According to character computing character is a unification of all the previous definitions, by referring back to the original meaning of the word. Character is defined as the holistic concept representing all interacting trait and state markers that distinguish an individual. Traits are characteristics that mainly remain stable over time. Traits include personality, affect, socio-demographics, and general health. States are characteristics that vary in short periods of time. They include emotions, well-being, health, cognitive state. Each characteristic has many representation methods and psychological models. The different models can be combined or one model can be preset for each characteristic. This depends on the use-case and the design choices.

== Areas ==
Research into character computing can be divided into three areas, which complement each other but can each be investigated separately. The first area is sensing and predicting character states and traits or ensuing behavior. The second area is adapting applications to certain character states or traits and the behavior they predict. It also deals with trying to change or monitor such behavior. The final area deals with creating artificial agents e.g., chatbots or virtual reality avatars that exhibit certain characteristics.

The three areas are investigated separately and build on existing findings in the literature. The results of each of the three areas can also be used as a stepping stone for the next area. Each of the three areas has already been investigated on its own in different research fields with focus on different subsets of character. For example, affective computing and personality computing both cover different areas with a focus on some character components without the others to account for human behavior.

== The Character-Behavior-Situation triad ==
Character computing is based on a holistic psychologically driven model of human behavior. Human behavior is modeled and predicted based on the relationships between a situation and a human's character. To further define character in a more formal or holistic manner, we represent it in light of the Character–Behavior–Situation triad. This highlights that character not only determines who we are but how we are, i.e., how we behave. The triad investigated in Personality Psychology is extended through character computing to the Character–Behavior–Situation triad. Any member of the CBS triad is a function of the two other members, e.g., given the situation and personality, the behavior can be predicted. Each of the components in the triad can be further decomposed into smaller units and features that may best represent the human's behavior or character in a particular situation. Character is thus behind a person's behavior in any given situation. While this is a causality relation, the correlation between the three components is often more easily used to predict the components that are most difficult to measure from those measured more easily. There are infinitely many components to include in the representation of any of C, B, and S. The challenge is always to choose the smallest subset needed for prediction of a person's behavior in a particular situation.
