= IPhone 5 =

Smartphone developed by Apple (2012–2013)

iPhone 5

- iPhone 5 in Slate Color
- Developer: Apple
- Manufacturer: Foxconn (on contract)
- Type: Smartphone
- Generation: 6th
- First released: September 21, 2012; 14 years ago
- Availability by region: September 21, 2012: United States; United Kingdom; Canada; France; Germany; Australia; Japan; Hong Kong; Singapore; September 28, 2012: Austria; Belgium; Czech Republic; Denmark; Estonia; Finland; Hungary; Ireland; Italy; Liechtenstein; Lithuania; Luxembourg; Netherlands; New Zealand; Norway; Poland; Portugal; Slovakia; Slovenia; Spain; Sweden; Switzerland; November 2, 2012: India; Mexico; Thailand; November 9, 2012: Colombia; December 7, 2012: South Korea; December 14, 2012: Albania; Antigua and Barbuda; Armenia; Bahamas; Bahrain; Bolivia; Brazil; Chile; China; Costa Rica; Cyprus; Ecuador; Grenada; Indonesia; Israel; Jamaica; Jordan; Kuwait; Macedonia; Malaysia; Moldova; Montenegro; Panama; Paraguay; Philippines; Qatar; Russia; Saudi Arabia; South Africa; Taiwan; Turkey; United Arab Emirates; Venezuela; December 21, 2012: Angola; Barbados; Botswana; Cameroon; Central African Republic; Egypt; Guinea; Ivory Coast; Kenya; Madagascar; Mali; Mauritius; Morocco; Niger; Nigeria; Senegal; St. Kitts; St. Lucia; St. Vincent & the Grenadines; Tunisia; Uganda; Vietnam
- Discontinued: September 10, 2013; 13 years ago
- Units sold: Two million units in the initial 24 hours of pre-order; Five million units in the first three days of release
- Predecessor: iPhone 4s
- Successor: iPhone 5c; iPhone 5s
- Compatible networks: GSM, CDMA, 3G, EVDO, HSPA+, LTE
- Form factor: Slate
- Dimensions: 123.8 mm (4.87 in) H; 58.6 mm (2.31 in) W; 7.6 mm (0.30 in) D
- Weight: 112 g (3.95 oz)
- Operating system: Original: iOS 6.0; Last: iOS 10.3.4, released July 22, 2019
- System-on-chip: Apple A6
- CPU: 1.3 GHz dual core 32-bit ARMv7-A "Swift"
- GPU: PowerVR SGX543MP3, up to 68 GFLOPS
- Memory: 1 GB LPDDR2-1066 RAM
- Storage: 16, 32 or 64 GB eMMC 4.5
- Battery: 3.8 V, 5.45 Wh (1,440 mAh) Lithium-ion battery: Talk time: Up to 8 hours; Standby time: Up to 225 hours (9 days, 9 hours); Internet use: Up to 8 hours (3G), up to 8 hours (LTE), up to 10 hours (Wi-Fi); Video playback: Up to 10 hours; Audio playback: Up to 40 hours (1 day, 16 hours)
- Rear camera: Sony Exmor R IMX145; 8 MP iSight back-side illuminated sensor HD video (1080p) at 30 frame/s IR filter Aperture f/2.4 5 element lens face detection (stills only); Image stabilization
- Front camera: 1.2 MP, HD video (720p)
- Display: 4 in (100 mm) diagonal (16:9 aspect ratio), multi-touch display, LED backlit IPS TFT LCD, 1,136×640 pixels at 326 ppi, 800:1 contrast ratio (typical), 500 cd/m^{2} max. brightness (typical), Fingerprint-resistant oleophobic coating on front
- Sound: Single loudspeaker 3.5 mm TRRS, 20 Hz to 20 kHz frequency response (internal, headset); 3.5mm audio jack Microphone
- Connectivity: Wi-Fi (802.11 a/b/g/n) (802.11n: 2.4 and 5 GHz), Bluetooth, GPS & GLONASS, Quad-band GSM/GPRS/EDGE (850, 900, 1800, 1900 MHz), Quad-band UMTS/HSDPA+/DC-HSDPA (850, 900, 1900, 2100 MHz), 8-pin Lightning connector. • GSM model (A1428): Dual-band LTE (Bands 4, 17: 1700 (AWS), 700 MHz). • GSM model (A1429): Tri-band LTE (Bands 1, 3, 5: 2100, 1800, 850 MHz). • CDMA model (A1429): Tri-band 2G CDMA (800 (CDMA over ESMR), 850, 1900 MHz). Dual-band 3G CDMA/EV-DO Rev. A and Rev. B (850, 1900 MHz). Penta-band LTE (Bands 1, 3, 5, 13, 25: 2100, 1800, 850, 700c, 1900 MHz).
- Data inputs: Multi-touch touchscreen display; 3-axis gyroscope; 3-axis accelerometer; Digital compass; Proximity sensor; Ambient light sensor
- Model: A1428 (GSM); A1429 (CDMA); A1442 (CDMA, China)
- Made in: China
- Website: Apple – iPhone 5 – The thinnest, lightest, fastest iPhone ever. at the Wayback Machine (archived September 30, 2012)

The iPhone 5 is a smartphone that was developed and marketed by Apple. It is the 6th generation iPhone, succeeding the iPhone 4s, and preceding both the iPhone 5s and iPhone 5c. It was formally unveiled as part of a press event on September 12, 2012, and subsequently released on September 21, 2012. The iPhone 5 was the first iPhone to be announced in September, and setting a trend for subsequent iPhone releases, the first iPhone to be completely developed under the guidance of Tim Cook and the last iPhone to be overseen by Steve Jobs. The iPhone 5's design was used three times, first with the iPhone 5 itself in 2012, then with the iPhone 5s in 2013, and finally with the first-generation iPhone SE in 2016.

The iPhone 5 featured major design changes in comparison to its predecessor. These included an aluminum-based body which was thinner and lighter than previous models, a taller 4-inch screen with a nearly 16:9 aspect ratio, the Apple A6 system-on-chip, LTE support, and Lightning, a new compact dock connector which replaced the 30-pin design used by previous iPhone models. This was the second iPhone after the iPhone 4s to include Apple's new Sony-made 8 MP camera.

Apple began taking pre-orders on September 14, 2012, and over two million were received within 24 hours. Initial demand for the iPhone 5 exceeded the supply available at launch on September 21, 2012, and was described by Apple as "extraordinary", with pre-orders having sold twenty times faster than its predecessors. While reception to the iPhone 5 was generally positive, consumers and reviewers noted hardware issues, such as an unintended purple hue in photos taken, and the phone's coating being prone to chipping. Reception was also mixed over Apple's decision to switch to a different dock connector design, as the change affected iPhone 5's compatibility with accessories that were otherwise compatible with previous iterations of the line.

Alongside the iPhone 4, the iPhone 5 was officially discontinued by Apple on September 10, 2013, with the announcement of its successors, the iPhone 5s and the iPhone 5c. The iPhone 5 has the joint second-shortest lifespan of any iPhone ever produced with only twelve months in production, breaking with Apple's standard practice of selling an existing iPhone model at a reduced price upon the release of a new model. This was broken by the iPhone X which only had ten-months in production from November 2017 to September 2018, and tied with the iPhone XS which had twelve-months from September 2018 to September 2019. The iPhone 11 Pro and subsequent "Pro" designated iPhones have also had twelve month availability, being discontinued upon release of its successor.

The iPhone 5 was replaced as a midrange and then an entry-level device by the iPhone 5c; the 5c internal hardware specifications are almost identical to the 5 albeit having a less expensive polycarbonate exterior shell. The iPhone 5 supports iOS 6, 7, 8, 9 and 10. The iPhone 5 does not support iOS 11 due to it dropping support for 32-bit devices. The iPhone 5 is the second iPhone to support five major versions of iOS following the iPhone 4s.

== History ==
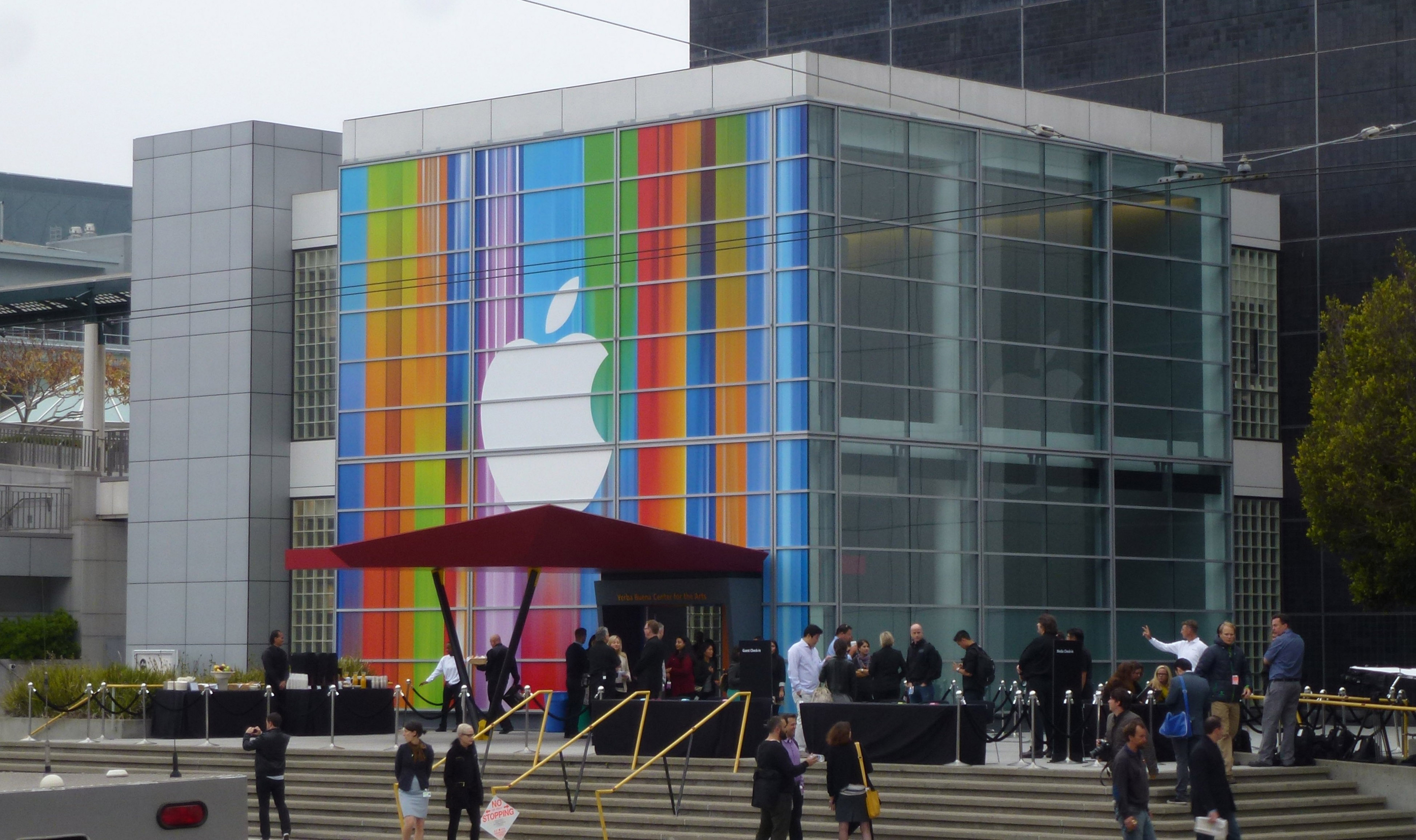
The Yerba Buena Center for the Arts in San Francisco, where the iPhone 5 was unveiled on September 12, 2012

Rumors about the iPhone 5 began shortly after the announcement of the iPhone 4s, though detailed leaks did not emerge until June 2012. On July 30, 2012, reports pinpointed the dates on which the iPhone 5 would be unveiled and released, along with some accurate predictions of its features. On September 4, 2012, Apple announced they would be hosting an event at the Yerba Buena Center for the Arts in San Francisco on September 12, 2012. A shadow of the numeral 5 was featured in the invitations sent to the media, suggesting that the next iPhone would be unveiled at the event.

At the unveiling, Apple announced the iPhone 5 and also introduced new iPod Nano and iPod Touch models. They also stated that pre-orders would be accepted starting September 14, 2012. Over two million pre-orders were received within 24 hours. The iPhone 5 was made available for sale to the public on September 21, 2012. Initial demand for the new phone exceeded the record set by its predecessor, the iPhone 4s, by selling over 5 million units in the first three days. On November 30, 2012, Apple added an unlocked version of the iPhone 5 to their online US store, with the 16 GB model starting at US$649.

The iPhone 5 was officially discontinued by Apple on September 10, 2013, with the announcement of its successors, the iPhone 5s and the iPhone 5c. While the 5c shared almost the same internal hardware as the iPhone 5, the 5c used a lower-cost polycarbonate plastic case in place of the original 5's aluminum form. The introduction of the 5c deviated from Apple's previous market strategy, where the previous iPhone model would remain in production, but sold at a lower price point below the new model.

On April 28, 2014, Apple initiated an out of warranty recall program to replace any failing power buttons of iPhone 5 models which were manufactured prior to March 2013 at no cost. On August 23, 2014, Apple announced a program to replace batteries of iPhone 5 models that "may suddenly experience shorter battery life or need to be charged more frequently" which were sold between September 2012 and January 2013.

=== Litigation ===
Following the release of the iPhone 5, Samsung announced that it was filing a lawsuit against Apple for infringing eight of its patents. The case was scheduled to begin in 2014. In a statement, Samsung said it had "little choice but to take the steps necessary to protect our innovations and intellectual property rights". Litigation between the two involving patent infringement continued in multiple countries, and was eventually settled out of court in 2018.

== Production ==
The components and labor required to construct the most basic iPhone 5 are estimated to cost US$207, which is US$19 more than the cost of components for the corresponding iPhone 4s model. The LTE module in the iPhone 5 alone costs $34, $10 more than the cellular module in the iPhone 4s. Similarly, screens used in the iPhone 5 cost $44, which is $7 more than the screen of its predecessor. Mashable noted that the profit margin of selling each device is "huge" as the iPhone 5 retails for US$649.

After the announcement of the device, a lack of supply was evident. This was due to a shortage of components such as the screen. Reports emerged, stating that Sharp was unable to ship the screen before the debut of the iPhone 5, and other manufacturers reported that it was difficult to keep up with demand. As a result, the number of pre-orders rose due to the uncertainty of stock at retail stores, and the delivery dates for pre-orders were postponed to dates that were after the initial release date of the device.

=== Quality control inspectors strike ===
China Labor Watch, a New York State–based NGO, reported that "three to four thousand" Foxconn workers who work at the iPhone 5 production plant in Zhengzhou stopped working on October 5, 2012. The strikes occurred after Apple implemented a stricter quality standard on their products, which includes a 0.02 mm restriction on indentations inflicted during production, and imposed demands related to scratches on frames and back covers. The strikes were also attributed to the employer forcing employees to work on a public holiday. The report stated training was inadequate for quality demands expected and led to employees producing products that did not meet standards. During the strike, conflicts between quality control inspectors and employees resulted in brawls. China Labor Watch also claimed that concerns raised by inspectors were not addressed by factory management. Foxconn spokesmen admitted that a micromanagement problem exists, but also said that there were only 300 to 400 workers absent and the conflicts did not influence production processes. In November 2012 Foxconn chairman Terry Gou reported that the delay in production was due to undisclosed difficulties in assembly.

== Features ==
=== Operating system and software ===
The iPhone 5 features iOS, Apple's mobile operating system. The user interface of iOS is based on the concept of direct manipulation, using multi-touch gestures. Interface control elements consist of sliders, switches, and buttons. Interaction with the OS includes gestures such as swipe, tap, pinch, and reverse pinch, all of which have specific definitions within the context of the iOS operating system and its multi-touch interface. Internal accelerometers are used by some applications to respond to shaking the device (one common result is the undo command) or rotating it vertically (one common result is switching from portrait to landscape mode).

The iPhone 5 is shipped with iOS 6, which was released on September 19, 2012. Many of the iPhone 5's features that work specifically with the included iOS 6.0 operating system only worked in certain territories on release. Apple has said this is a rolling program, which will take longer to implement across more regions.

The phone can act as a hotspot, sharing its internet connection over WiFi, Bluetooth, or USB, and also accesses the App Store, an online application distribution platform for iOS developed and maintained by Apple. The service allows users to browse and download applications from the iTunes Store that were developed with Xcode and the iOS SDK and were published through Apple.

The iPhone 5 can play music, movies, television shows, ebooks, audiobooks, and podcasts and can sort its media library by songs, artists, albums, videos, playlists, genres, composers, podcasts, audiobooks, and compilations. Options are always presented alphabetically, except in playlists, which retain their order from iTunes. Users can rotate their device horizontally to landscape mode to access Cover Flow. Like on iTunes, this feature shows the different album covers in a scroll-through photo library. Scrolling is achieved by swiping a finger across the screen. Alternatively, headset controls can be used to pause, play, skip, and repeat tracks. On the iPhone 5, the volume can be changed with the included Apple Earphones, and the Voice Control feature can be used to identify a track, play songs in a playlist or by a specific artist, or create a Genius playlist.

Like the iPhone 4s, the iPhone 5 supports Siri, that allows the user to operate the iPhone by spoken commands. The software was improved in iOS 6 to include the ability to make restaurant reservations, launch apps, dictate Facebook or Twitter updates, retrieve movie reviews and detailed sports statistics.

On the iPhone 5, texting can be aided by the voice assistant, which converts speech to text. In addition to regular texting, messaging on the iPhone 5 supports iMessage, a specialized instant messaging program and service that allows unlimited texting to other Apple devices running iOS 5 or later. This supports the inclusion of content such as images and sound in text messages, integration with the device's voice-controlled software assistant, and read acknowledgments for sent messages. Input to the device comes from a keyboard displayed on the multi-touch screen or by voice-to-text by speaking into the microphone. Entered text is supported by predictive and suggestion software; there is a multi-language spell-checker which recognizes many regional accents of different languages.

iOS 6 features several new and/or updated apps, which includes Apple Maps and Passbook. Apple's built-in Maps app, which replaced the former Maps app powered by Google Maps, had been universally derided and lacked many features present in competing maps apps. It uses Apple's new vector-based engine that eliminates lag, making for smoother zooming. New to Maps is turn-by-turn navigation spoken directions, 3D views in some major cities and real-time traffic. iOS 6 is able to retrieve documents such as boarding passes, admission tickets, coupons and loyalty cards through its new Passbook app. An iOS device with Passbook can be scanned under a reader to process a mobile payment at locations that have compatible hardware. The app has context-aware features such as notifications for relevant coupons when in the immediate vicinity of a given store.

Facebook is integrated through Apple's native apps with iOS 6. Facebook features can be directly accessed from within native apps such as Calendar which can sync Facebook events, or use Facebook's like button from within the Apple App Store.

New privacy settings are available to users. In addition to location services, the following have been added in iOS 6: photos (already partially restricted in iOS 5), contacts (address book), calendars, reminders, Bluetooth sharing, Twitter, Facebook, and Sina Weibo. iOS 6 also came with a "Limit ad tracking" user control feature in the general settings menu to allow users the option to prevent targeted advertising. Apple's Advertising Identifier replaces the company's existing Unique Device Identification (UDID) standard. Advertising networks not yet using Apple's Advertising Identifier device identifier standard would not be affected, although Apple will require the standard in the future.

=== Design ===
Similar to its predecessor, the iPhone 5 features a boxlike look with flat sides. The stainless steel frame used in the iPhone 4 was replaced with an aluminum frame featuring chamfered edges. Apple emphasized the improved build quality of the iPhone 5 at its press event.

The iPhone 5 is 18% thinner, 20% lighter, and has 12% less overall volume than its predecessor, the iPhone 4s. The phone's aluminum body is 0.30 in (7.6 mm) thick. At the September 2012 conference Apple claimed it was the thinnest smartphone in the world at 7.6 mm, though that claim was disputed as the Chinese Oppo Finder was thinner and some other smartphones could be considered to be thinner, depending upon where thickness is measured. The Oppo Finder measured 6.65 mm (0.262 in) at its thinnest point and 7.1 mm (0.28 in) at its thickest point making it overall thinner than the iPhone. This design was used three times, first with the iPhone 5 in 2012, then with the 5s in 2013, and finally with the first-generation iPhone SE in 2016.

=== Hardware ===
The iPhone 5 uses a system on chip (SoC), called the Apple A6. The SoC comprises a 1.3 GHz dual-core processor, 1 GB of RAM and a tri-core PowerVR SGX543MP4 running at 266 MHz. The iPhone 5's operating memory (LPDDR2-1066 eDRAM) was doubled, from 512 MB to 1 GB. Storage capacities available are fixed at 16, 32 or 64 GB, the same as the 4s; plug-in memory cards are not supported. The two color options are black (with black glass and slate-colored metal trim), and white (with white ceramic and silver-colored metal trim); again the same color options (though differently implemented) as its predecessor the 4s had. The iPhone 5 retains the 8 megapixel back camera on the iPhone 4s, but has improved low-light performance, and has a 40% faster photo capture than its predecessors, while having a purple hue when a strong source of light is present in the photograph. The front camera, which is accessible through the FaceTime and camera app has a lower resolution, at 1.2 megapixels. The rechargeable lithium-ion battery with a charge capacity of 1440mAh is built in and cannot be replaced by the user; it is rated at ≤225 hours of standby time and ≤8 hours of talk time. There are three separate models of the phone available: one supporting CDMA and two GSM versions. This can have knock-on effects for which version of the device will actually work in which countries/regions. The phone takes a nano-SIM, smaller than the micro-SIM of the iPhone 4 and iPhone 4s.

Hardware benchmarking conducted using Geekbench and GLBenchmark validates several claims that Apple included on their website and mentioned at the unveiling of the device, these include two times faster and two times the graphics performance. In the Geekbench overall hardware assessment, the iPhone 5 received a score that was approximately 2.5 times higher than the iPhone 4s. The benchmark conducted using GLBenchmark for the iPhone 5 returned a score that was 2 times better than the iPhone 4s. The result was however inconsistent as a 3D graphics benchmark assessment using Passmark returned a score that was only approximately 1.45 times better than the iPhone 4s. Battery life assessments conducted by AnandTech concluded that the battery life is shorter on the iPhone 5 than its predecessor when performing certain tasks, however when performing other tasks the iPhone 5 battery outlasts the iPhone 4s.

The Retina Display is 1,136 × 640 pixels with an aspect ratio of almost exactly 16:9, (minus one extra row of horizontal pixels). With a diagonal of 4" it has a display size of 6.7 square inches, compared to 5.7 in iPhone 4 and 4s. The pixel density remains the same as the 4s model, which is 326 pixels per inch. Screen icons of the iPhone 5 are arranged in a matrix of six rows of four icons each. The increased screen size allows the sixth row of icons to be added to the five rows that were present in the iPhone 4. In-cell touch sensor technology from Sharp slims the screen which allows for a thinner phone. The screen's color saturation is 44% greater than its predecessor.

There are three microphones (placed on the front, side and back) for noise cancellation and video calls.

On April 28, 2014, Apple initiated an out of warranty recall program to replace any failing power buttons of iPhone 5 models which were manufactured prior to March 2013 at no cost.

On August 23, 2014, Apple announced a program to replace batteries of iPhone 5 models that "may suddenly experience shorter battery life or need to be charged more frequently" which were sold between September 2012 and January 2013.

=== Accessories ===
Apple Lightning connector

The iPhone 5, as well as the iPod Touch (5th generation), iPod Nano (7th generation), iPad (4th generation), and iPad Mini feature a new dock connector named Lightning, which replaces the 30-pin Apple Dock connector introduced in 2003 by Apple on the iPod (3rd generation). The Apple Lightning connector has eight pins and all signaling is digital. This new connector is smaller than the previous one, helping the iPhone 5 to be slimmer than its predecessors. Apple Lightning cables have duplicate pins on two sides of each plug, so it can be inserted either way round. Various accessories will be available to convert the Apple Lightning connector to the older 30-pin Apple Dock connector or USB, although not all old accessories will work, as not all signals are available, in particular video output and the iPod Out feature for BMW automobiles.

Earphones known as Apple EarPods are included with the iPhone 5 and other devices announced at the Apple media event on September 12, 2012. They superseded earphones that were included with previous generation iPhones and iPods. According to technology commentators, the redesign of the earphones is aimed to improve sound quality by allowing air to travel in and out more freely. Apple states that the redesign of their earphones allows it to "rival high-end headphones that cost hundreds of dollars more". Reviews by Gizmodo and TechRadar reported that although the redesigned earphones sounded better than its predecessor, reviewers felt that quality of sound produced is poor.

=== Network compatibility ===
Model	FCC id	Carriers/region	CDMA bands	GSM bands	UMTS bands	LTE bands	Notes
A1428, serial number ending with FH19, FH1C, FH1D, FH1F, FH1G, FH1H	BCG‑E2599A	T-Mobile US, AT&T Mobility, and other GSM carriers in North America	N/A	Quad	850, 900, 1700, 1900, 2100	2/4/5/17	Tap "Settings > General > About" to check serial number
A1428, other serial numbers	BCG‑E2599A	AT&T Mobility and other GSM carriers in North America	N/A	Quad	850, 900, 1900, 2100	2/4/5/17	Early A1428 model that does not support T-Mobile US. Beginning December 4, 2013, Apple is shipping A1428 models with UMTS band 1700 enabled. The phones shipped before December 4, 2013, will not be updated to support that band
A1429	BCG‑E2599A	Verizon Wireless, Sprint Corporation, other CDMA carriers	0, 1, 10	Quad	850, 900, 1900, 2100	1/3/5/13/25	
A1429	BCG‑E2599A	GSM carriers outside of North America	Disabled	Quad	850, 900, 1900, 2100	1/3/5	According to the FCC filing there is no difference between GSM and CDMA A1429 model. CDMA bands and LTE bands 13, 25 are disabled in A1429 phones configured to work on GSM networks.

AT&T, Verizon, and Sprint offer LTE access in the US, while in the UK, only EE and Three are able to offer LTE access. On March 26, 2013, T-Mobile announced they would begin carrying the iPhone 5, making it the first iPhone to be available on all four nationwide carriers in the United States. The T-Mobile version of the iPhone features a modified version of the A1428 iPhone 5 model enabling Advanced Wireless Services (AWS) support. All carriers in Canada selling the iPhone 5 have their own LTE networks, including Rogers Wireless, Fido Solutions, Bell Mobility, Virgin Mobile Canada, Telus Mobility and Koodo Mobile.

42 officially recognized bands exist for LTE, however rollouts are coalescing around the more-popular bands, based on what historically has been made available in specific regions. In Europe, bands available for LTE include, 2.6 GHz (the 3G-expansion band) and 800 MHz (cleared of analogue TV), with 1,800 MHz appearing in a few places including the UK. In Germany, the only carrier network supported is that of T-Mobile with its 1,800 MHz band allocated to LTE. Some countries in Europe, including Denmark, Norway, Sweden, and others—will not be able to offer LTE connectivity via the iPhone 5 to their customers on their current LTE networks, as they have already deployed LTE in the 2.6 GHz band, which the iPhone 5 does not support. In November 2012, a representative of Swisscom reported that the iPhone 5 only supports LTE on networks that have been tested and certified by Apple.

Unlike the iPhone 4s, which was the only "world phone" produced by Apple, there are three versions of the iPhone 5, which differ by the frequency used. All three work on 2G GSM/GPRS and 3G UMTS/EDGE networks on both the 800 and 1900 MHz bands used in the Americas, and the 900 and 1800 MHz bands used elsewhere. The CDMA A1429 model works on CDMA networks, such as that of Sprint and Verizon. Another version supports LTE only on the 1700/2100 MHz AWS band, and the 700 MHz band recovered after the conversion to digital television in the US (channels 52 to 56), currently the only network that supports the band is AT&T. GSM A1429 supports several other LTE bands available in other countries, such as LTE bands 1, 3, 5.

== Reception ==
=== Critical reception ===
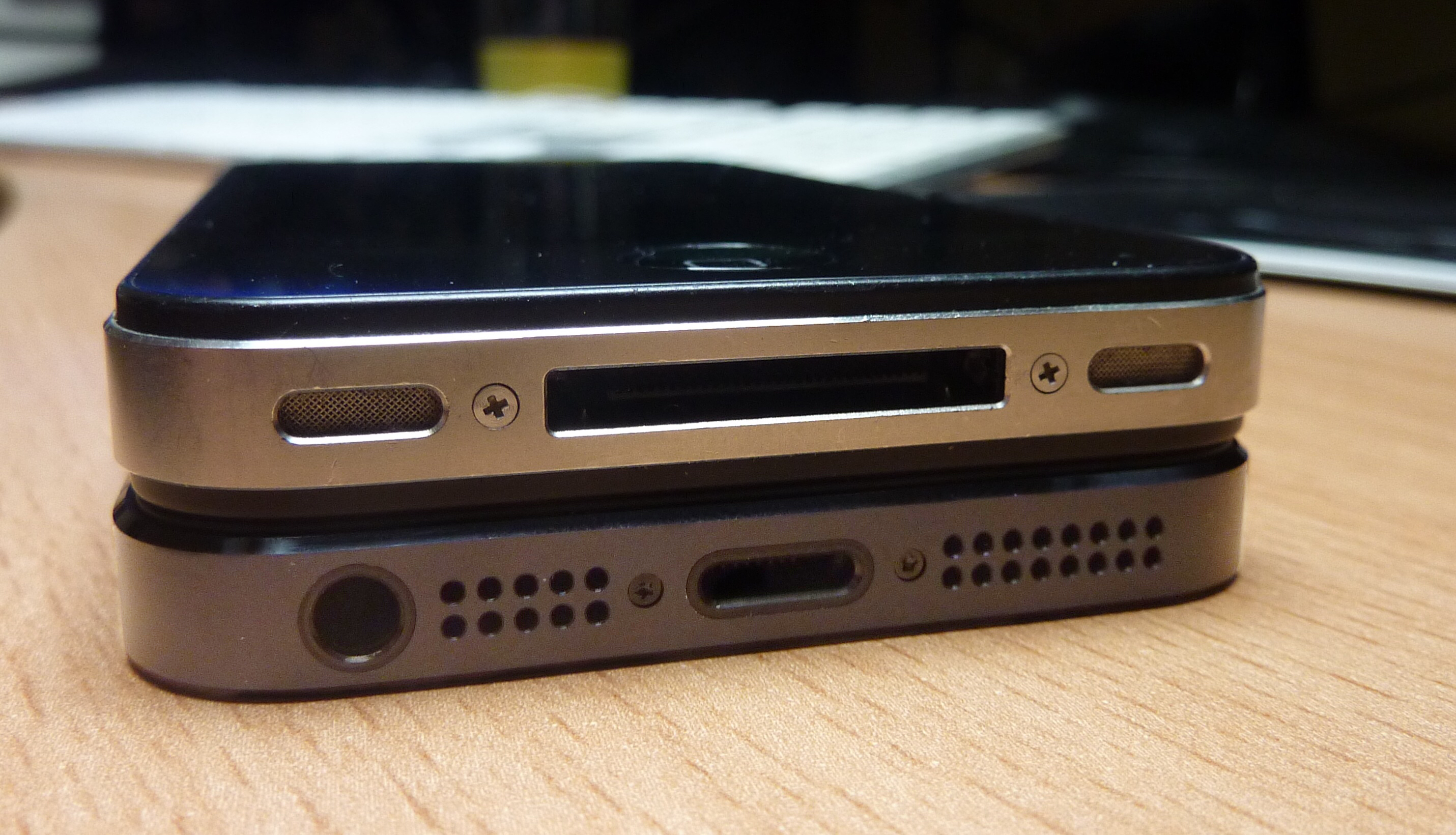
Comparison between the 30-pin port of the iPhone 4s (top) and Lightning port of the iPhone 5 (bottom)

The iPhone 5 received mainly positive reviews from commentators and reviewers. Tim Stevens from Engadget praised the iPhone 5 for its high resolution screen surpassing that of the iPhone 4s, which he considered to be one of the best phone screens available on the market. Stevens was critical of the new connector, which is incompatible with devices and cables that use the superseded 30-pin connector, although the LA Times reported that this was a change necessary to make the device smaller than its predecessor. Engadget agreed that Apple fulfilled most of the promises stated on its website, such as "better battery performance", "two times the graphics performance" and "two times faster." David Pogue of The New York Times considered the 4-inch Retina display a "nice but not life-changing change", and praised the Lightning connector for its size, sturdiness, and reversibility, while noting its lack of support for older accessories, remarking that "Apple has a long history of killing off technologies, inconveniently and expensively, that the public had come to love". Technology columnist Ed Baig of USA Today was impressed that Apple had met the public's "lofty expectations" for the iPhone 5 in a competitive market. In a repair-ability review, iFixit found the iPhone 5 easier to disassemble and repair than its predecessor.

Wired reported that the iPhone 5 design, carried on in the iPhone 5s and first-generation iPhone SE, was regarded as "long been the golden child of Apple phone design and a benchmark for phones in general", while the succeeding iPhone 6/6s design was less critically acclaimed as it "felt a little bit wrong, as though you were holding a slick $650 bar of soap". Wired described the iPhone 5 as "elegance rooted in the way the aluminum and glass work together. It felt streamlined, yet substantial, which is different from the iPhone 6, which feels substantial in size alone. Plus, unlike the ubiquitous rounded corners of the 6, the iPhone 5 didn't really look like anything else on the market at the time". However, the iPhone 5's design was not suited to scaling up, in contrast to the iPhone 6/6s which could better accommodate the growing consumer trend towards larger screen sizes and indeed spawned the 6/6S Plus phablet models.

==== Criticism ====
Reviewers and commentators were critical of the new Maps app that replaced Google Maps in iOS 6. It had been reported to contain errors such as misplacement of landmark tags, directing users to incorrect locations and poor satellite images. Nine days after Maps' release, Apple issued a statement apologizing for the frustration it had caused customers and recommending that they try alternate mapping services.

==== Errors ====
Gizmodo editor Diaz discussed the correspondence between Apple and a reader about purple flare in pictures taken on iPhone 5 camera. Apple's response to the issue was that it is normal and advised the customer to aim the camera away from bright light sources when taking photos. Tests conducted by TechCrunch indicate that the problem existed on the iPhone 4s but was more distinct and pronounced on the iPhone 5. Consumer Reports found that the purple haze effect occurred on several other manufacturers' phones including the Samsung Galaxy S III and Motorola Droid Razr Maxx, and that it was not less pronounced on the iPhone 4s. The report concluded that digital cameras in general, including higher-end SLRs, can all suffer from lens flare in which a purple-tinted effect was not uncommon.

==== Problems ====
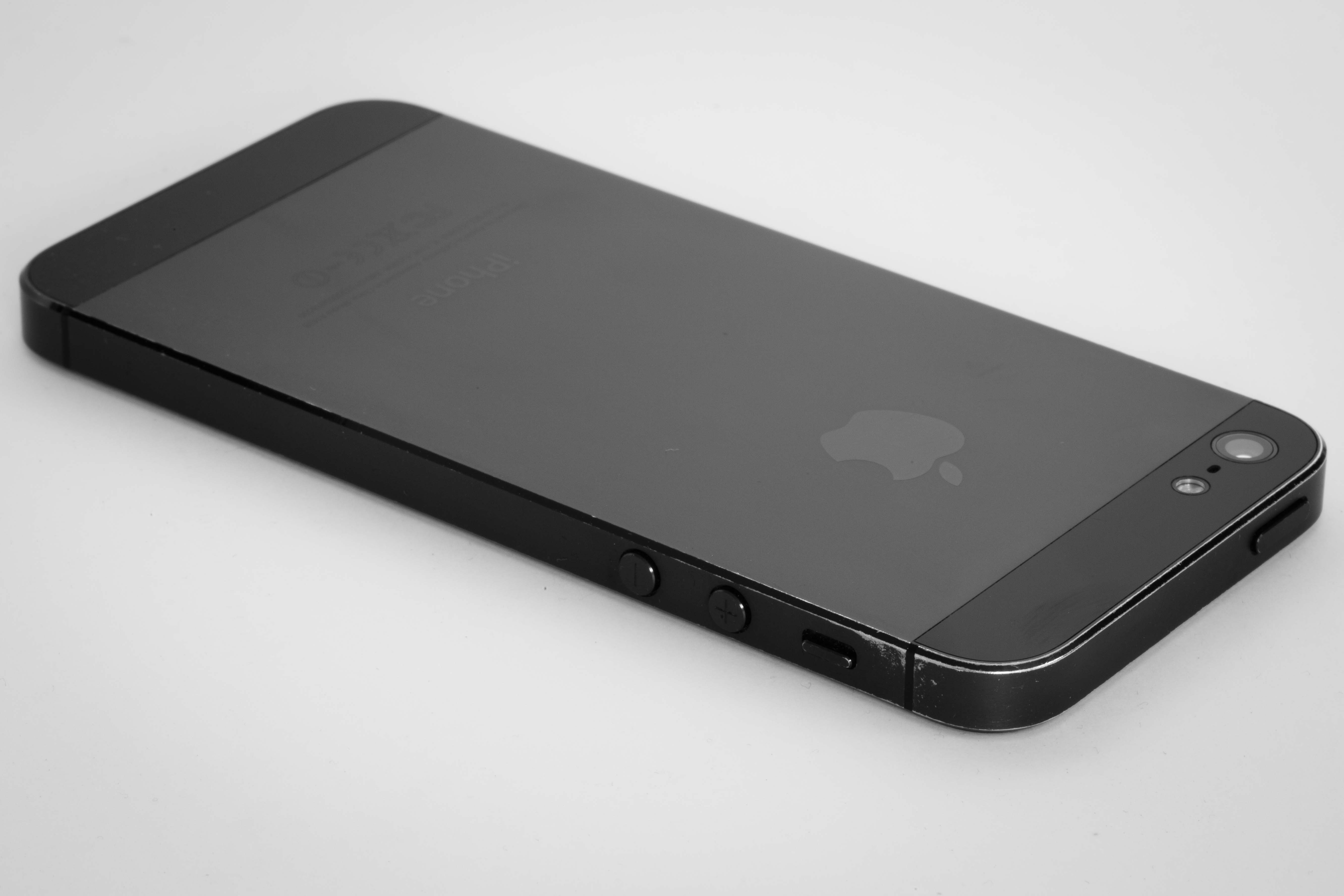
Example of an iPhone 5 with chipped coating

There were anecdotal claims of the coating of primarily black iPhone 5s chipping off, exposing the bright aluminium underneath. Apple executive's response to email correspondence from an affected customer summarized that it was normal for aluminum to scratch. The term "scuffgate", a reference to "antennagate" which affected the iPhone 4, was applied by various sources such as CNET, Yahoo News, and All Things Digital to describe the scuffing issue.

Some users reported on the Internet that the white model leaked light behind the screen, though the issue was not unique to the iPhone 5, as it also affected other Apple devices.

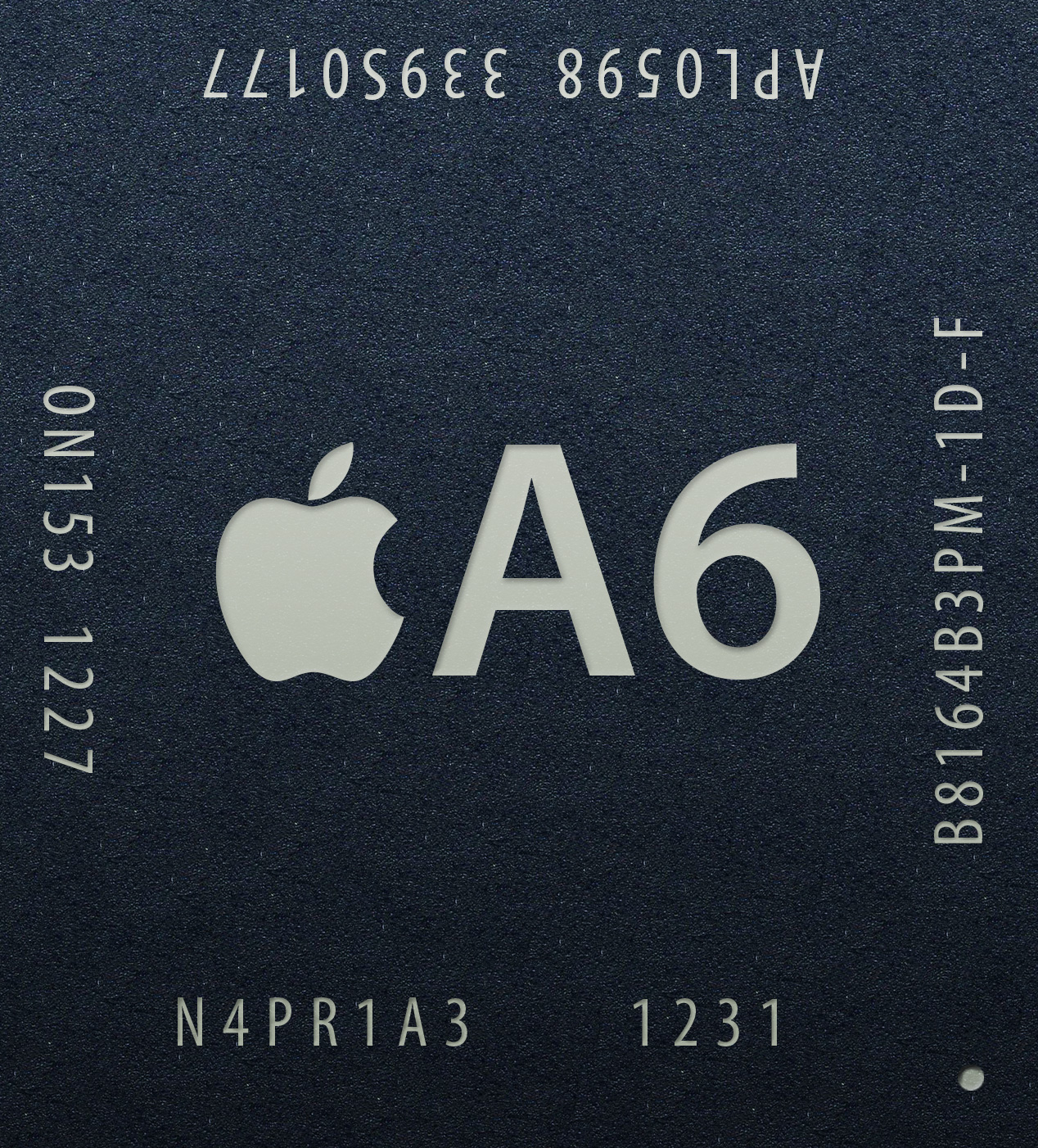
Apple's A6 chip is 22% smaller than the Apple A5 and consumes less power.

=== Commercial reception ===
Techcrunch reported that the iPhone 5 sold out twenty times faster than the 4 and 4s models. Apple said that they were "blown away by the customer response". Phil Schiller, Apple's vice-president of worldwide marketing, said that over two million iPhone 5 orders had been received in the first 24 hours. AT&T said that the iPhone 5 was the fastest-selling iPhone the company had ever offered, selling over five million units on launch weekend and exceeding the supply available. The release and sale of the iPhone 5 has also slowed down the growth of Android according to market share reports released by Kantar Worldpanel ComTech. During the first 16 days after the phone's initial release it comprised over 20% of all phones sold in that period.

J.P. Morgan's chief economist, Michael Feroli said that "sales of iPhone 5 could boost annualized US GDP growth by $3.2 billion, or $12.8 billion at an annual rate." Shortly after the announcement of the iPhone 5 and preceding the launch, Apple's stock price rose to a record $705.07, but within three months fell to $507.48. According to the analysis of Eric Savitz, Apple's stock decline and resulting losses were not the result of any issue with the new Maps application, but disappointed investors. He points to initial hardware sales of only five million, compared to projections up to twice that, as the primary cause.

Since the release of the iPhone 5, discounts on previous generation iPhones have enabled Apple to maintain a market lead in the United States and Japan, but the iPhone continued to lag behind the combined total of Android phones in the global market.

== See also ==
- List of iPhone models
- Timeline of iPhone models

Preceded by iPhone 4s	iPhone 5; 6th generation	Succeeded by iPhone 5C / iPhone 5s
