= IPhone naming =

Naming system of the iPhone model series by Apple

The iPhone is a line of smartphones designed and marketed by Apple Inc. that uses Apple's iOS mobile operating system. The first-generation iPhone was announced by Apple CEO Steve Jobs on January 9, 2007. Since then, Apple has annually released new iPhone models and iOS updates. iPhone naming has followed various patterns throughout its history.

== Nomenclature ==
=== Current naming style ===
iPhones are named with "iPhone" followed by a number, which denotes the iPhone generation, and sometimes a suffix (such as Plus, Pro, Pro Max). The "Air" is a thin and lightweight model that replaces the "Plus" models. "Pro" indicates the premium model (since iPhone 11 Pro), while "Pro Max" indicates the larger model of the "Pro" line (since iPhone 11 Pro Max). "e" indicates the entry-level model (since iPhone 16e). "Duo" indicates the foldable iPhone model. Currently, models with just a number (i.e. without a suffix) indicate the flagship of the iPhone (since iPhone 11).

=== Previous naming style ===
The letter suffixes S, R and C were previously used. "S" was used to denote a slight upgrade (iPhone 3GS, 4S, 5S, 6S and 6S Plus, XS and XS Max), but it has since been dropped; the iPhone XS and XS Max were the last models to feature the "S". "R" was used to denote the lower-priced iPhone XR, which is the only iPhone with "R" in its name. Similarly, "C" was used to denote the lower-priced iPhone 5C, a variant of the iPhone 5 with similar features and internals, and is the only iPhone with "C" in its name. "Plus" indicated a physically larger iPhone model of the same generation, sometimes with higher end features. The "SE" used in the entry-level iPhone SE line stood for "Special Edition". They were all named and marketed as simply "iPhone SE", and can be differentiated by generation suffixes. iPhone X (pronounced "10"), iPhone XR (pronounced "10R") and iPhone XS and XS Max (pronounced "10S") are currently the only iPhones to have been branded with Roman numerals (X).

== iPhones ==
Fifty-five different iPhone models have been produced:

- iPhone (2007–2008)
- iPhone 3G (2008–2010)
- iPhone 3GS (2009–2012)
- iPhone 4 (2010–2013)
- iPhone 4S (2011–2014)
- iPhone 5 (2012–2013)
- iPhone 5C (2013–2015)
- iPhone 5S (2013–2016)
- iPhone 6 (2014–2016)
- iPhone 6 Plus (2014–2016)
- iPhone 6S (2015–2018)
- iPhone 6S Plus (2015–2018)
- iPhone SE (1st) (2016–2018)
- iPhone 7 (2016–2019)
- iPhone 7 Plus (2016–2019)
- iPhone 8 (2017–2020)
- iPhone 8 Plus (2017–2020)
- iPhone X (2017–2018)
- iPhone XR (2018–2021)
- iPhone XS (2018–2019)
- iPhone XS Max (2018–2019)
- iPhone 11 (2019–2022)
- iPhone 11 Pro (2019–2020)
- iPhone 11 Pro Max (2019–2020)
- iPhone SE (2nd) (2020–2022)
- iPhone 12 mini (2020–2022)
- iPhone 12 (2020–2023)
- iPhone 12 Pro (2020–2021)
- iPhone 12 Pro Max (2020–2021)
- iPhone 13 mini (2021–2023)
- iPhone 13 (2021–2024)
- iPhone 13 Pro (2021–2022)
- iPhone 13 Pro Max (2021–2022)
- iPhone SE (3rd) (2022–2025)
- iPhone 14 (2022–2025)
- iPhone 14 Plus (2022–2025)
- iPhone 14 Pro (2022–2023)
- iPhone 14 Pro Max (2022–2023)
- iPhone 15 (2023–2025)
- iPhone 15 Plus (2023–2025)
- iPhone 15 Pro (2023–2024)
- iPhone 15 Pro Max (2023–2024)
- iPhone 16 (2024–present)
- iPhone 16 Plus (2024–2026)
- iPhone 16 Pro (2024–2025)
- iPhone 16 Pro Max (2024–2025)
- iPhone 16e (2025–2026)
- iPhone 17 (2025–present)
- iPhone Air (2025–present)
- iPhone 17 Pro (2025–2026)
- iPhone 17 Pro Max (2025–2026)
- iPhone 17e (2026–present)
- iPhone 18 Pro (2026–present)
- iPhone 18 Pro Max (2026–present)
- iPhone Duo (2026–present)

== Timeline ==
Timeline of iPhone models
See also: List of Apple products

Source: Apple Newsroom Archive

== Models never made ==
No models called the iPhone 2, iPhone 7S, iPhone 8S, iPhone 9 were ever produced; however, iPhone 9 was the rumored name for the iPhone SE (2020). The Mini and Plus models were discontinued after the iPhone 13 and iPhone 16, respectively.

The 1st-generation iPhone was colloquially known, retronymically, as the iPhone 2G, as the 2nd-generation iPhone was the iPhone 3G. The iPhone 4 did not support 4G; the iPhone 5 was the first with LTE support.
