= Visage Technologies AB =

Swedish computer vision software company

Coordinates: 40.097128°N 88.245690°W

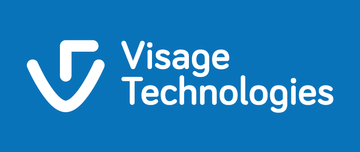
- Company type: Private
- Industry: Computer vision, face and head tracking, eye tracking, face animation
- Founded: 2002
- Founder: Jörgen Ahlberg, Igor S. Pandžić
- Headquarters: Linköping, Sweden (worldwide headquarters); Zagreb, Croatia
- Products: visageSDK
- Owner: Privately held
- Website: www.visagetechnologies.com

Visage Technologies AB is a private company that produces computer vision software for face tracking (head tracking, face detection, eye tracking, face recognition) and face analysis (age detection, emotion recognition, gender detection), along with a special business unit in automotive industry. The primary product of Visage Technologies is a multiplatform software development kit visageSDK.

== History ==
Visage Technologies AB was founded in Linköping, Sweden in 2002. The founders of Visage Technologies were among the main contributors to the MPEG-4 Face and Body Animation International Standard. Since Visage Technologies' founders have academic background, Visage Technologies promotes research collaboration with academic institutions, especially with Faculty of Electrical Engineering and Computing, University of Zagreb and University of Linköping. From 2015, the company expanded with a new automotive industry business unit that works with object tracking.

== Application ==
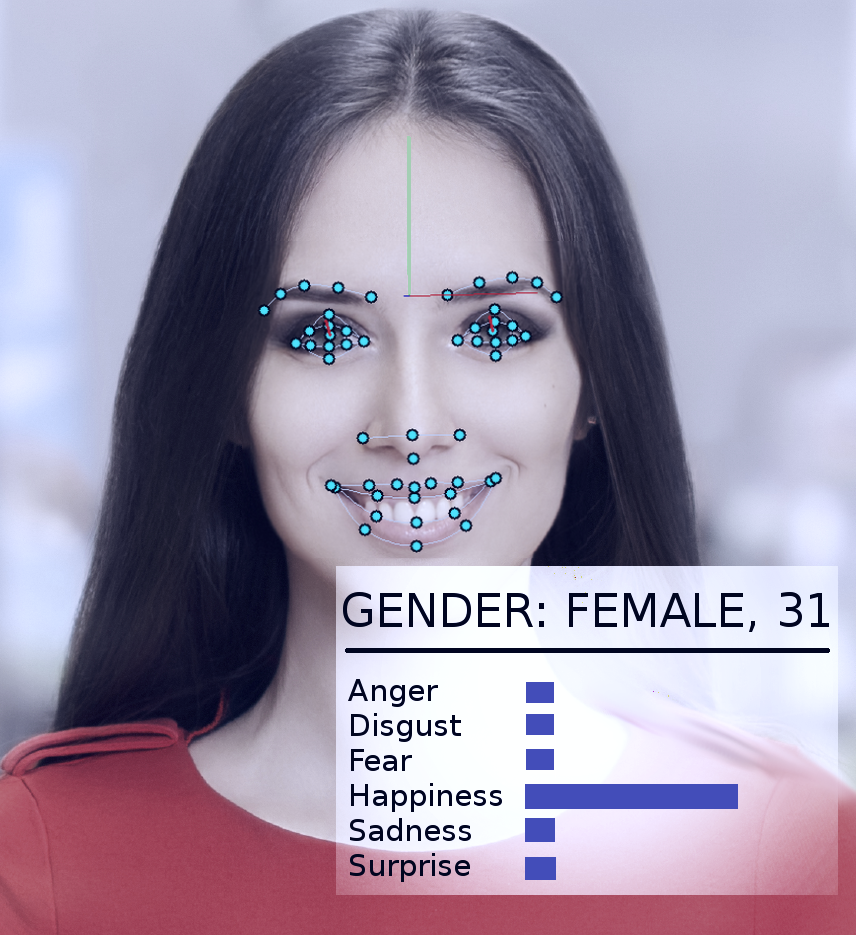
Example of visageSDK (Visage Technologies' main product) face tracking and analysis (gender, age and emotion recognition

Visage Technologies AB is licensing facial tracking technology for industrial and academic clients. Some of the previous and current industrial clients are: Fujitsu, BMW, Coca-Cola, Publicis Groupe, Facerig and Emotiv, while some agencies used visageSDK for mobile apps for Samsung, FX, or X Factor, along with marketing campaigns for Disney, Armani or Škoda.

Various academic institutions as well use visage|SDK to aid them in research, such as United States Naval Academy, Princeton University, Rutgers University, City College of New York, and McGill University. in the fields of face tracking and detection, artificial intelligence, natural language processing, and other computer vision studies and applications.

Recently, visageSDK has been used to create solutions for virtual makeup (Oriflame etc.) and 3D face filtering (face masking).

== See also ==
- Automotive industry
- Biometrics
- Computer vision
- Emotion recognition
- Eye tracking
- Face detection
- Facial motion capture
- Facial recognition system
- Game development
- Head tracking
- Machine learning
- Marketing research
- Three-dimensional face recognition
- visageSDK
