= Emospark =

Artificial intelligence console

EmoSpark
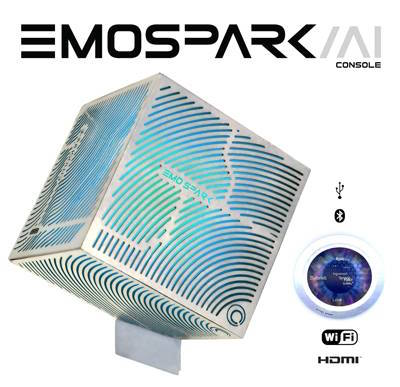
- Company type: Privately Held
- Industry: Artificial intelligence
- Founded: 2007 London, United Kingdom
- Founder: Patrick Levy-Rosenthal
- Headquarters: New York City, United States
- Number of employees: 1-10 employees
- Parent: EmoShape Ltd, EmoShape LLC
- Website: emospark.com

EmoSpark is an artificial intelligence console created in London, United Kingdom by Patrick Levy-Rosenthal. The device uses facial recognition and language analysis to evaluate human emotion and convey responsive content according to the emotion. The console measures 90 mm x 90 mm x 90 mm and is cube shaped. It operates on an "Emotional Processing Unit", an emotion chip developed by Emoshape Inc. that enables the system to create emotional profile graphs of its surroundings. The emotional processing unit is a patent pending technology that is said to create synthesised emotional responses in machines. EmoSpark was funded through an Indiegogo campaign which aimed to raise $200,000.

== Product overview ==
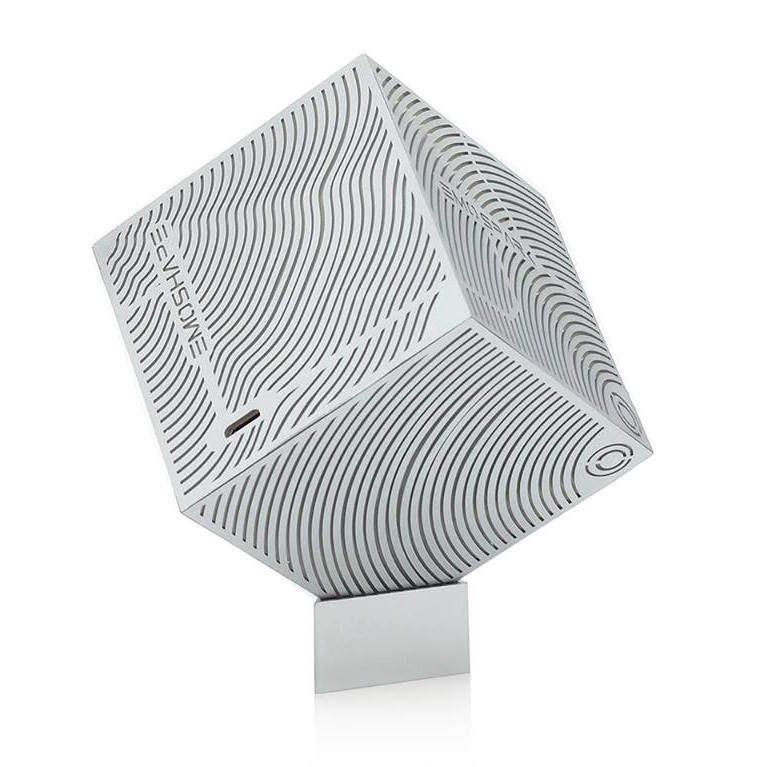
EmoSPARK Cube

EmoSpark was created by French inventor Patrick Levy-Rosenthal, as an emotionally intelligent artificial life unit for the home that can interact with people. It is powered by Android and can communicate with users through typed input from a computer, tablet, smartphone or TV as well as through spoken commands.

The EmoSpark's features are categorized into two types: functional and emotional. EmoSpark is said to have the ability to perform practical software-based tasks. Through the smartphone interface, it is able to gauge a person’s emotions and is reported to have a conversational library of over 2 million sentences. The face-tracking technology identifies users likes and dislikes to categorize their emotional responses to stimuli such as videos and music. The device has an emotional spectrum that is composed of eight emotions which are surprise, sadness, joy, trust, fear, disgust, anger and anticipation.

EmoSpark monitors a person's facial expressions and emotions through images from an external camera, which are then processed through an emotion text analysis and content analysis. The New Scientist reported that EmoSpark had the ability to work on the best way to cheer up its users, emotionally.

=== Connectivity ===
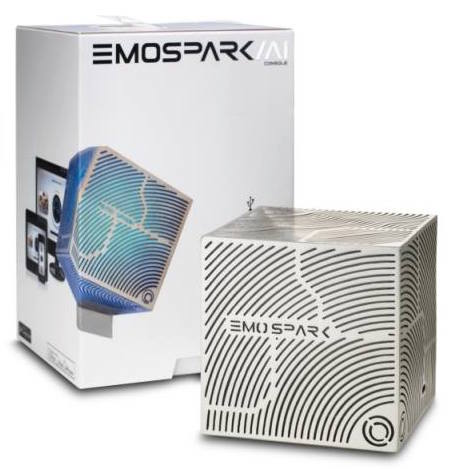
EmoSPARK Cube and Packaging

EmoSpark is able to connect to Facebook and YouTube to present users with content designed to improve their mood, or to Wikipedia for collaborative knowledge that can be shared when users ask questions of it. Through Android OS, EmoSpark is able to be customized with Google Play store apps.

The cube is expected to develop its own personality based on the communications it has had with the people using it.

== EmoShape ==
The Emotion Chip (EPU) used in the cube is created by the US company Emoshape Inc, founded by Levy-Rosenthal. EmoShape Ltd (UK) was the company that developed EmoSpark cube. Patrick Levy-Rosenthal also received the IST Prize in 2005 from the European Council for Applied Science, Technology and Engineering.
