= Emotive Internet =

Conceptualization of the Internet as emotional space

Emotive Internet (also Emotive Web, Emotional Internet) is a conceptualization of the Internet as an emergent emotional public space, such as how it serves as a space for the social sharing of emotions. It can also denote the quality of the Internet that allows it to be used to communicate in an emotive fashion or with emotional intent. Since it is an expressive medium, it also enables users to construct and represent their identities online. This is evident in the way emotional responses have been integrated in online communication and interactions.

The concept is also linked to emotional analytics and emotion-sensing applications, particularly those technologies that power the Internet of Things (IoTs) - the smart home devices that have the capability to store and process the user's emotional profile to deliver services.

== Concept ==
It is recognized that the Internet has the capability to allow its users a genuine display of emotions. This is demonstrated in the video conferencing platform, which represents the closest form of synchronous computer-mediated communication (CMC) to face-to-face communication because it tends to reproduce, on a technological level, relationship and communicative experience that feature complex sensorial channels. It transmits a considerable amount of information so that it sustains interpersonal relationships and exploit shared context that allows for mutual understanding. This phenomenon is also no longer confined to communication between users but also between users and smart devices or users and applications. An application of the emotive quality of the Internet involves emerging technologies that fall within the affective computing field. These include those that use sensor technologies and computer algorithms to enable smart machines to detect, recognize, and share human emotions.

The display of emotions in the Internet can be observed in platforms where users interact such as online forums. A Polish study, which analyzed thousands of posts, discovered that not only are users allowed to express their emotion but they also produce highly emotion-evoking contents that affect other people and their behaviors. The new communication technologies provided the average citizens the opportunity to subvert political and media hierarchies so that they are able to play an active role in shaping policy and dialogue through highly-emotional content. Due to the so-called "virality" of the Internet, particularly with the speed by which emotions such as fear and anger are transmitted, the speed of reaction often takes precedence over slower and more cautious assessments. This is also demonstrated in the case of the so-called "emotive falsehood", which is said to travel faster than fact today.

An emotive Internet became possible because of broadband technology, which allowed users to easily communicate visual and interactive rich media, as well as Wi-Fi technology, which made the Web available everywhere so that users' control of and demand for words, images, and audio exceeded that of television or of anything that has ever existed. The development of web technologies also enable the emotional digital space such as the case of Web 5.0, which is designed to enable computers to interact with humans by measuring and computing their effects and emotions through neuro technology so that web experiences are more personalized and exciting. There is also the Emotion Markup Language (EmotionML) 1.0 W3C, which is taking its first step towards a coherent and consistent means of annotating emotional states.

== Identity and representation ==
For some theorists, Emotive Internet emerged as Internet users construct their identities online. It falls within the postmodern view that identity is multiple and shifting. A study, for instance, described this identity construction among American teenagers and cited the critical role played by emotive features of the Internet such as emoticons and "netspeak" in the process. In this platform, identities may be constructed through personality, social roles, relationships, and shared values as manifested by language, names or nicknames, avatars, and social cues. The language here, for example, assumes several dimensions such as linguistic, semantic, syntactic, stylistic, and rhetorical aspects.

The need for identity construction is driven by the way the Internet, particularly in terms of the textual computer-mediated communication, tend to produce a social void, where personal identities tend to fade and disappear. In the absence of crucial data such as facial expressions and other non-verbal cues in the processing of messages, new forms of feedback are created to allow these messages to be processed in terms of their social meaning. This is evident in the increasing role played by the emotive component of a text, which is recently gaining attention in computational linguistics. This is also shown in the range of buttons that people can use to express their emotions towards Facebook posts such as the Like button, which represents "liking" or any of its emergent meanings within the online communicative system. There is a study conducted by the Australian National University that showed that the number of Facebook likes help drive acceptance of what is real online.

== Emotional analytics ==
Emotion analytics is one of the Internet-based technologies that can identify and analyze the full human emotional spectrum, which includes mood, attitude, and emotional personality. There are, for instance, new Internet technologies that can now recognize emotions. These include those based on galvanic skin response (GSR) technology, which use biometric sensors of wearable devices to gauge or identify emotions and stress-levels based on data taken from perspiration, breathing, heart rate, and skin response, among others. The information is analyzed in combination with the user's digital life, covering information from his calendar and social media activities, etc.

The personalization algorithm allows for the so-called "emotional Internet", which creates a user experience that reflects daily likes, subscribes, locations, tags, comments, ratings, and emotions responses. Technology companies such as Google and Amazon develop sophisticated algorithm so that devices outfitted with their respective smart assistant technologies can process the emotional information gathered from the interaction between the device and its user. For instance, Amazon's smart assistant Alexa can now function as some form of therapist since its algorithm allows the device to judge emotions. There is also the case of a chatbot called Replika, which functions as a digital companion and is powered by a neural network that gives it the ability to "emote". It is capable of learning about its users so it could offer an ongoing, one-on-one conversation as well as "caring" that resembles friendship. Millions of users have already downloaded the application.

== Form of control ==
There are specific applications that can demonstrate the dynamics of the relationship between emotion and the internet. These include dating websites, which are identified as arenas that control and shape the emotional ordering of users, which means that spontaneous emotions in these platforms are regulated. There is also the notion that instead of being a digital friend or companion, the technologies that drive the emotive Internet serve as a stalker, collecting the user's digital behavior so it can mold where the user attention is, who he interacts with, and what new things he will discover.

Another example is the Internet meme culture, which does not only serve as a way to affirm political beliefs and identities but also a way to manipulate media into spreading political views. This is the case because memes give people a place to express themselves and their values so that even if they do not circulate useful facts, they are not viewed as falsehoods but folkloric contents that focus on motivations rather than accuracy.
