= IPhone 11 Pro =

2019 smartphone by Apple

iPhone 11 Pro iPhone 11 Pro Max

- iPhone 11 Pro in Midnight Green
- Brand: Apple
- Manufacturer: Foxconn
- Type: Smartphone
- First released: September 20, 2019; 7 years ago
- Discontinued: October 13, 2020; 6 years ago
- Predecessor: iPhone XS / iPhone XS Max
- Successor: iPhone 12 Pro / iPhone 12 Pro Max
- Related: iPhone 11
- Compatible networks: 2G / 3G / 4G LTE
- Form factor: Slate
- Dimensions: Pro: H: 144 mm (5.7 in); W: 71.4 mm (2.81 in); D: 8.1 mm (0.32 in); Pro Max: H: 158 mm (6.2 in); W: 77.8 mm (3.06 in); D: 8.1 mm (0.32 in)
- Weight: Pro: 188 g (6.6 oz); Pro Max: 226 g (8.0 oz)
- Operating system: Original: iOS 13; Current: iOS 27.2.1, released November 9, 2026
- System-on-chip: A13 Bionic
- Modem: Dual SIM with eSIM; Gigabit-Class LTE Cat.19 with 4x4 MIMO, up to 30 LTE bands
- Memory: 4 GB LPDDR4X RAM
- Storage: 64, 256 or 512 GB NVMe
- Battery: Pro: 3.83 V 11.67 Wh (3,046 mAh) Li-ion; Pro Max: 3.79 V 15.04 Wh (3,969 mAh) Li-ion
- Charging: Lightning fast charging, Qi wireless charging
- Rear camera: 12 MP (wide), f/1.8, 26 mm, 1/2.55", 1.4 μm, dual pixel PDAF, OIS 12 MP (telephoto), f/2.0, 52 mm, 1/3.4", 1.0 μm, PDAF, OIS, 2x optical zoom 12 MP (ultrawide), f/2.4, 120˚, 13 mm, 1/3.6"
- Front camera: 12 MP (wide), f/2.2 aperture, 23 mm, 1/3.6"
- Display: Pro: 5.85 in (149 mm), 2436 × 1125 px, supplied by Samsung Display; Pro Max: 6.46 in (164 mm), 2688 × 1242 px, supplied by Samsung Display and LG Display; All models: 458 ppi, Super Retina XDR, Haptic Touch, wide color display (DCI-P3), true tone display, 800 cd/m^{2} max. brightness (typical), 1,200 cd/m^{2} max. brightness (HDR), with fingerprint-resistant oleophobic coating.
- Sound: Stereo speakers with Spatial audio and Dolby Atmos
- Connectivity: Wi-Fi 6 (802.11ax), Bluetooth 5.0, Ultra-wideband (UWB)
- Water resistance: IP68, up to 4 m (13 ft) for 30 minutes
- Made in: China
- Other: FaceTime audio- or video-calling, USB-C to Lightning, GPS/GNSS position, velocity and time, Voice over LTE
- Website: iPhone 11 Pro – Apple at the Wayback Machine (archived October 2, 2020)

The iPhone 11 Pro and iPhone 11 Pro Max are smartphones developed and marketed by Apple. Serving as Apple's flagship models of the 13th generation of iPhones, they succeeded the iPhone XS and XS Max, respectively, upon their release. Apple CEO Tim Cook unveiled the devices alongside the standard model, the iPhone 11, on September 10, 2019, at the Steve Jobs Theater at Apple Park in Cupertino, California. Pre-orders began on September 13, 2019, and the phones went on sale on September 20. They were discontinued on October 13, 2020, following the announcement of the iPhone 12 and iPhone 12 Pro, making them the fifth iPhones to be discontinued in another month other than September.

Notable improvements over the previous devices include the triple-lens rear camera system and the A13 Bionic chip. The 11 Pro and 11 Pro Max are Apple's first iPhones to feature a "Pro" designation, previously used only for larger Apple devices, such as the iPad Pro and MacBook Pro. They are also the first generation of iPhones that include a Lightning to USB-C cable in the box, which allows them to connect to a charger brick or to a Mac computer that only has USB-C ports, the only generation that included an 18-watt, "fast-charging" power adapter in the box, and the last generation that included the power adapter in the box (as well as EarPods).

The iPhone 11 Pro is the longest supported iPhone ever, along with the iPhone 11 and SE (2nd generation), supporting eight major versions of iOS from iOS 13 through iOS 27.

== History ==
During development, the phones were referred to as D42 and D43. Details regarding the iPhone 11 Pro line were leaked widely starting several months before the official release, with complete specifications, renderings, and real-life images of the phone being publicized. Substantial advancements in the camera and the continuation of the 'notch' design featured since the iPhone X were correctly predicted in leaks. Some leaks, however, were inaccurate; the inclusion of bilateral charging was widely anticipated and publicized, but was not part of the phone's design. Official release event invites sent out to press featured layered colored glass elements organized to form the Apple logo, which some reviewers drew similarities to Apple's original logo, suggesting new colors for the phone, and to a patent Apple filed for a new camera design earlier.

=== Release ===
The iPhone 11 and 11 Pro were unveiled in a press event at the Steve Jobs Theater in Cupertino, California on September 10, 2019; the first Apple event live streamed on YouTube. The event featured various other products and services other than the iPhone, including a new Apple Watch, a new iPad, Apple TV+, and Apple Arcade. Pre-orders began on September 13, with the iPhone 11 Pro starting from a base price of $999, and the larger screen Pro Max starting from $1,099. The phones were released on September 20 in the US and other countries, with all releases complete by December 6.

The iPhone 11, 11 Pro and the 11 Pro Max made up the 13th generation of iPhones.

=== Discontinuation ===
On October 13, 2020, after the iPhone 12 Pro and 12 Pro Max were announced, the iPhone 11 Pro and 11 Pro Max were discontinued and removed from sale on Apple's official website.

== Design ==
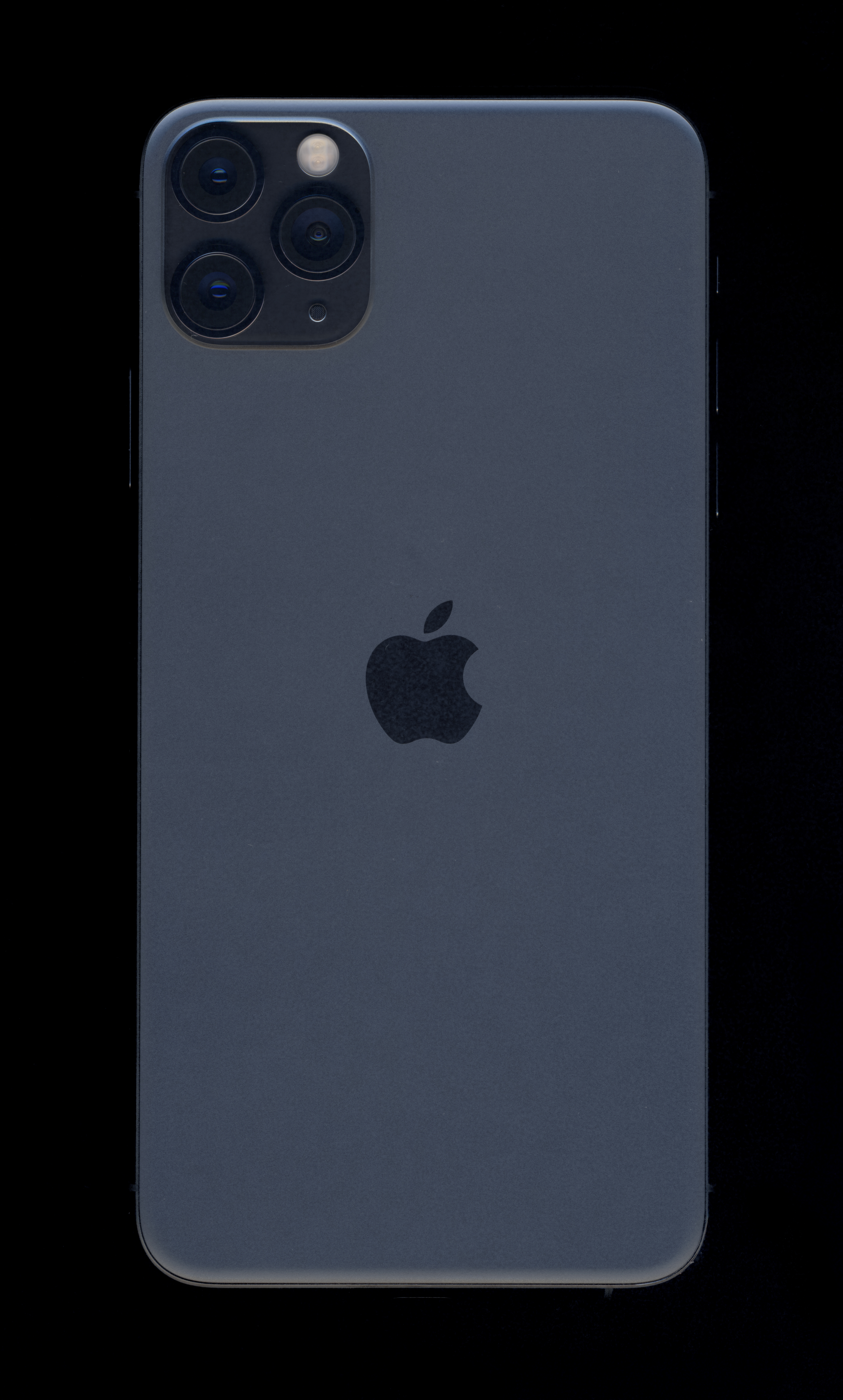
The backside of the iPhone 11 Pro Max in Space Gray

The iPhone 11 Pro and 11 Pro Max is available in Gold, Silver, Space Gray, and Midnight Green, a new color not available on previous iPhone models. Similar to the iPhone XS and XS Max respectively, there is a display cutout at the front that includes the 12 MP TrueDepth camera system and speaker. There is also a new rear camera design with three lenses and a flash in a larger, square-shaped bump, which is the most visible difference compared to the iPhone XS. The Apple logo is now centered on the back of the device with no text, and the glass has a frosted matte finish, unlike the glossy finish found on other previous flagship iPhones.

Color	Name
	Silver
	Space Gray
	Gold
	Midnight Green

== Specifications ==
=== Hardware ===
The iPhone 11 Pro and 11 Pro Max both have an A13 Bionic processor. Both phones have three internal storage options: 64 GB, 256 GB, and 512 GB, and have 4 GB of RAM. Both models are rated IP68 water and dust resistant, and are resistant for 30 minutes at a depth of 4 meters. The warranty does not cover any water damage to the phone. Continuing the trend set starting with the iPhone 7, neither phone includes a headphone jack, but came with wired EarPods with a Lightning connector prior to Apple's decision to halt inclusion of them in October 2020, citing environmental impact. The iPhone 11 Pro and Pro Max are the first and only iPhones to be sold with a USB-C 18-watt fast charger.

==== Display ====
The iPhone 11 Pro has a 5.85 inch (149 mm) (marketed as 5.8-inch (15 cm)) OLED display with a resolution of 2436×1125 pixels (2.7 MP), while the iPhone 11 Pro Max has a larger 6.46-inch (164 mm) (marketed as 6.5-inch (17 cm)) OLED display with a resolution of 2688×1242 pixels (3.3 MP) which both have a pixel density of 458 PPI. Both models feature a Super Retina XDR Display with a 2,000,000:1 contrast ratio and a notch at the top for the TrueDepth camera system and speaker. Apple describes the display as having a "mini Apple Pro Display XDR" on a phone. They also have a True Tone and wide color display supporting HDR with 800 nits of standard brightness and 1200 nits peak brightness if necessary. The screen has an oleophobic coating that is fingerprint-resistant. The display of the iPhone 11 Pro and iPhone 11 Pro Max is made by Samsung.

==== Batteries ====
The iPhone 11 Pro is supplied with a 11.67 Wh (3,046 mAh) battery, a slight increase from the 10.13 Wh (2,658 mAh) found in the iPhone XS, while the iPhone 11 Pro Max has a 15.04 Wh (3,969 mAh) battery, another slight increase from the 12.08 Wh (3,174 mAh) found in the iPhone XS Max. Neither of the batteries are user-replaceable.

==== Cameras ====
The iPhone 11 Pro and Pro Max both include a triple-lens 12MP rear camera array. There is one ƒ/2.4 ultra-wide-angle lens with a 120° field of view and 2× optical zoom out, one ƒ/1.8 wide-angle lens, and one ƒ/2.0 telephoto lens with 2× optical zoom in. There is a burst mode, image stabilization, HDR, and a Portrait Mode supporting depth control and an advanced bokeh effect. iPhone 11 Pro also has an automatic Night Mode allowing the camera to take brighter pictures with reduced noise in low light environments. There is also a redesigned camera app that adds new features such as a scroll wheel for choosing between the different lenses and long-pressing the shutter button to take a video. Apple has also announced a new Deep Fusion feature which will take advantage of AI and machine learning for image processing.

The iPhone 11 Pro supports 4K video up to 60 fps and 1080p slow motion at up to 240 fps. However, Apple limits the full range of zoom (0.5× -6×) while shooting in 4K@60fps to either 0.5× – 1.5×, 1×, to 2× depending which lens is selected upon recording. All other resolutions/frame rates support the full zoom set. The phone also features an audio zoom feature which focuses audio on the area that is being zoomed in on. All of the cameras support video although only the wide and telephoto come with optical image stabilization. Video can be captured with multiple cameras at the same time, through the multi camera recording feature.

Both models also have a 12 MP TrueDepth front camera with a ƒ/2.2 aperture. The front camera also supports stabilized 4K video recording up to 60fps. Apple has added slow-motion video recording to the front camera in 1080p@120 fps, a feature which Apple refers to as "slofies". Similar to previous iPhone models, the TrueDepth system is also used for Face ID and Animoji.

=== Software ===
The iPhone 11 Pro and Pro Max was initially supplied with iOS 13. The newest iOS update that supports both phones as of September 2025, is iOS 26. Apple also announced that iOS 27 will support the iPhone 11 Pro and Pro Max (alongside the regular iPhone 11 series), contrary to previous speculation.

The phones also come with Siri, Face ID (through the TrueDepth camera), Apple Pay, and they support Apple Card.

== Reception ==
Upon release, the iPhone 11 Pro received generally positive reviews, with critics highlighting the improvements to the camera, display, and battery, although it was criticized for its similar design to the iPhone XS and the large camera bump, as well as the lack of rumored features such as bilateral wireless charging and USB-C. TechRadar critics praised the improved camera array, calling it "clearly the big upgrade", and also praised the faster A13 Bionic processor, and the display, while criticizing the design similarities compared to the iPhone XS including the display cut-out for the sensor housing, commonly referred to as "the notch," and also criticizing the cost. Pocket Lint also positively described the camera, the processor, display, and battery, camera design, and lack of bilateral wireless charging. The Verge and T3 positively described the general aspects of the phone, while stating that the 'pro' label may not be fully justified as the phone only helps Apple keep up with the competitors, not surpass them. The device received an overall score of 117 from DXOMARK, ranking it as the second-best smartphone camera on the site tied with the Samsung Galaxy Note 10+. An 11-point improvement over its predecessor, it had a photo score of 124 and a video score of 102.

Some trypophobic users responded to the September 2019 release of the iPhone 11 Pro, which features three closely spaced camera lenses, with comments that it triggered their trypophobia, due to the camera lenses resembling the look of small holes and clusters.

== Environmental data ==
=== Carbon footprint ===
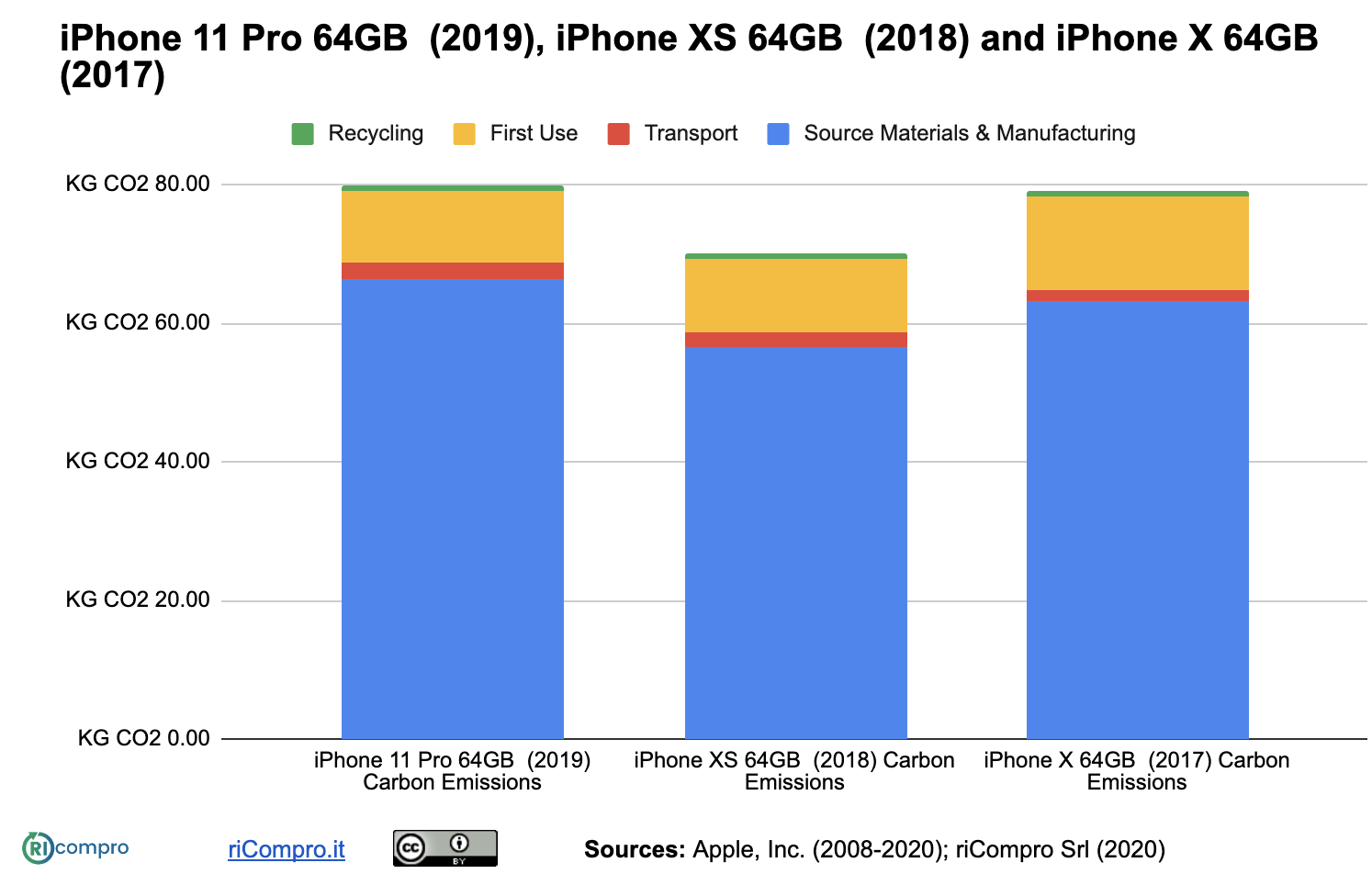
carbon footprint of 1st Life Cycle of an iPhone 11 Pro compared to iPhone XS and iPhone X

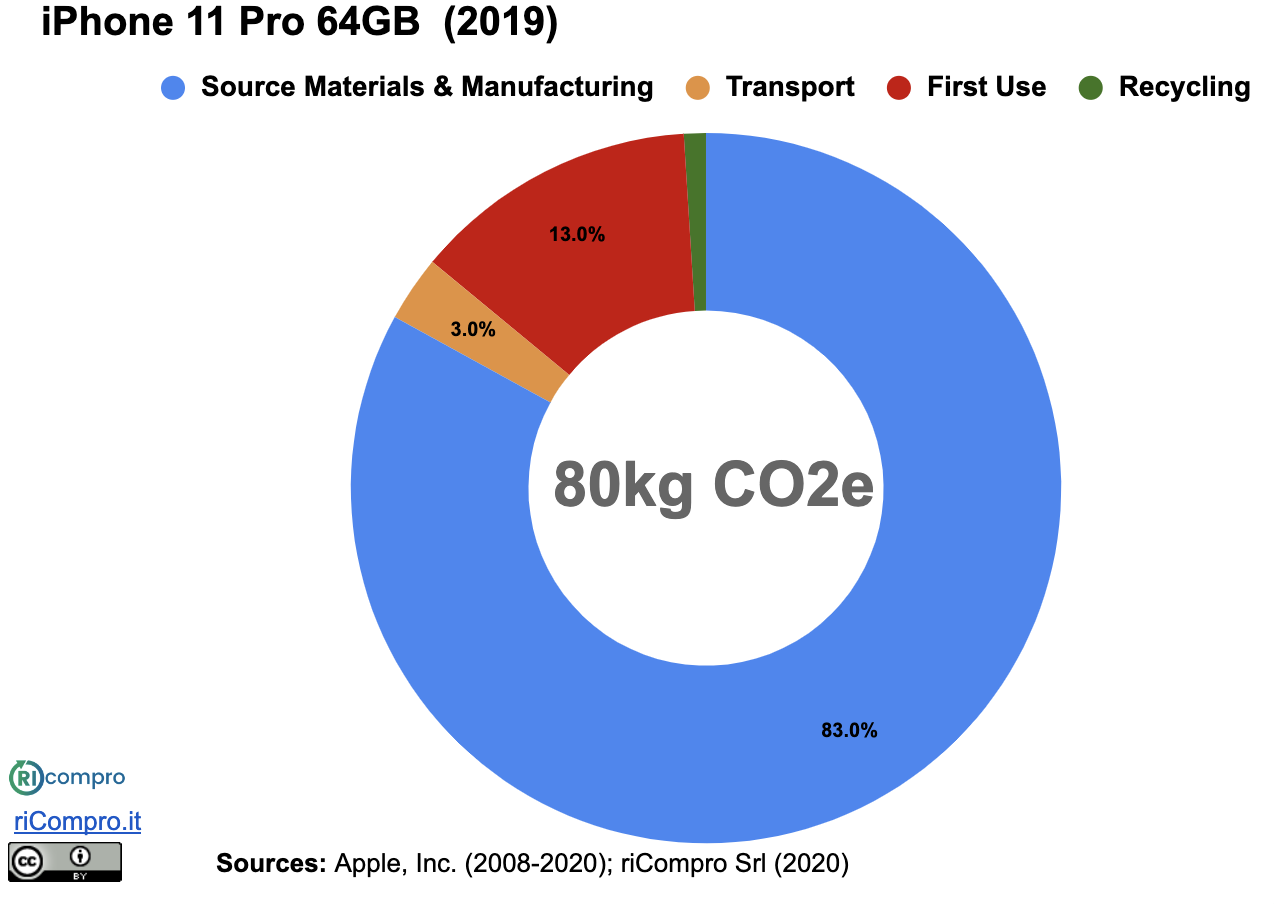
Carbon footprint of 1st life cycle of an iPhone 11 Pro

The iPhone 11 Pro has a carbon footprint of 80 kilograms (180 lb) CO2e emissions, which is 10 kilograms (22 lb) more than the preceding iPhone XS and 25 kilograms (55 lb) more than the iPhone 3G in 2008. 83% of the emissions are caused by the production of the device and primary resources while remaining emissions are caused by transportation and first use.

=== Repairability ===
The iPhone 11 Pro and Pro Max continue the strategy of discouraging customers to seek third party repairs while rendering repairs with Apple more costly: repair with non-genuine Apple parts such as batteries or displays can trigger warning messages on the phone instigating the customer to visit a certified technician to replace the respective parts with genuine ones. While the website clearly states that the phone will function properly despite the warning, this information is not passed in the context of the warning. Even if batteries are properly functioning and at full capacity the customers are prompted by a message on the phone to replace the battery. At the same time battery replacement with original spare parts saw an increase in pricing: after initially discounting battery replacements to $29 following the Batterygate scandal, battery replacement prices for all flagship iPhone models was reverted to US$69.00.

== See also ==
- History of iPhone
- List of iPhone models
- Timeline of iPhone models

Preceded by iPhone XS / XS Max	iPhone; 13th generation alongside iPhone 11	Succeeded by iPhone 12 Pro / 12 Pro Max
