= EarPods =

Headphones produced by Apple

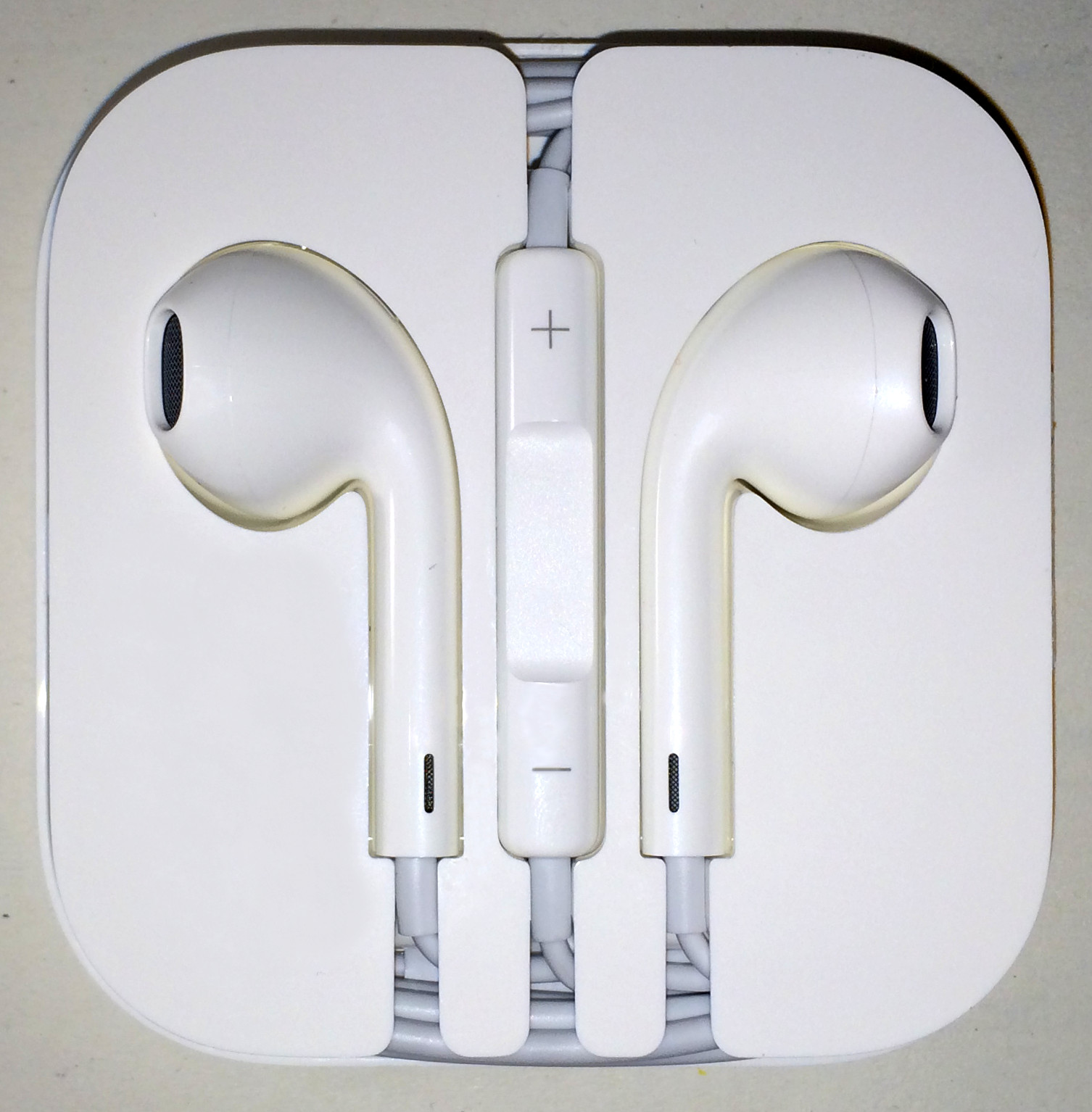
Apple EarPods in their box

EarPods are wired earphones designed and marketed by Apple Inc. They were introduced in September 2012 alongside the iPhone 5 and replaced Apple's earlier circular earbuds. EarPods are characterized by an asymmetrical, contoured design intended to better fit the human ear and improve comfort and sound performance. EarPods are available with three connector options: a 3.5 mm headphone plug, Lightning, and USB-C. They were bundled with various iPhone models from 2012 to 2020.

EarPods feature a rigid plastic housing with a distinctive elongated shape that rests against the concha of the ear rather than sealing the ear canal. Unlike in-ear monitors, EarPods do not use silicone or foam tips and are considered open-fit earphones.

== History ==
EarPods were initially available only with the 3.5 mm headphone connector. They were first bundled with the iPhone 5, iPod Touch (5th generation), and iPod Nano (7th generation). They feature an inline remote with playback and volume controls, as well as an integrated microphone. However, EarPods bundled with iPod models did not include the remote and microphone.

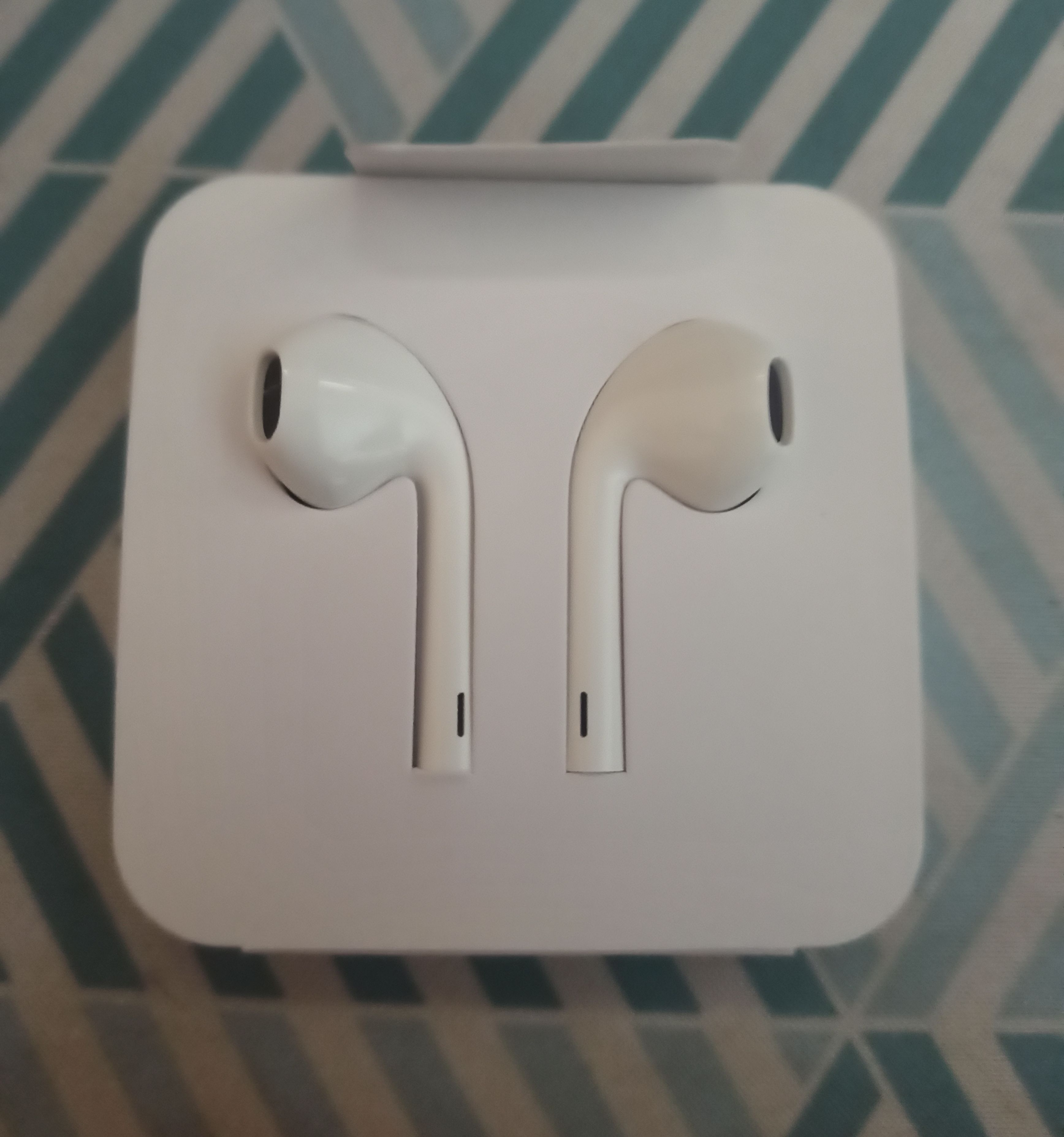
EarPods with first-version recyclable cardboard packaging

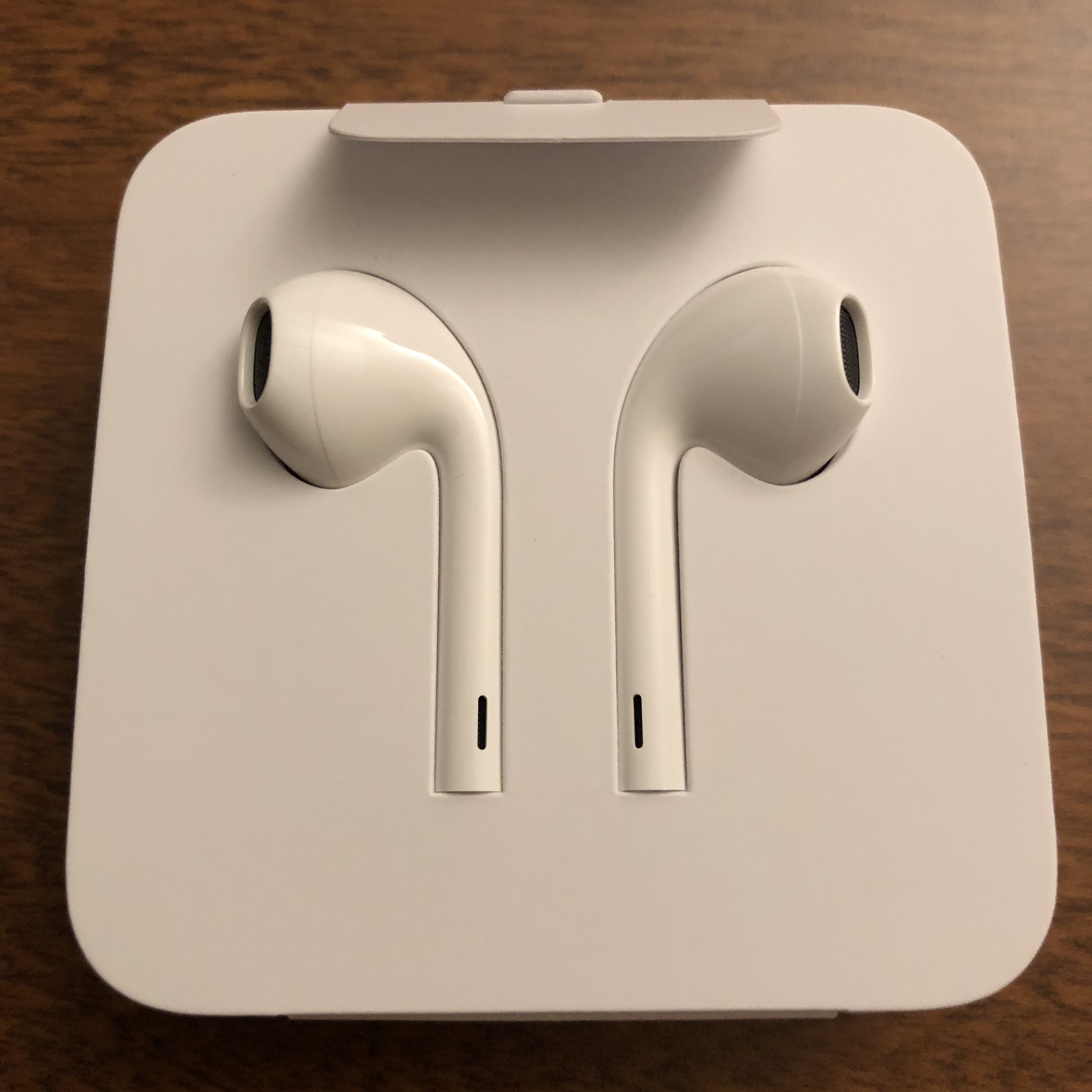
A later revision of EarPods with second-version recyclable cardboard packaging

EarPods with a Lightning connector were introduced in September 2016 alongside the iPhone 7, the first iPhone model without a 3.5 mm headphone connector. These EarPods are compatible with devices equipped with a Lightning port running iOS 10 or later. Because the Lightning connector does not carry analog audio, this version contains an internal digital-to-analog converter.

Beginning with the release of the iPhone 12 series in October 2020, Apple stopped bundling EarPods with new iPhones, except France until January 2022, Apple also reduced the retail price of EarPods to coincide with this change. After Apple discontinued the iPod product line in 2022, EarPods became available exclusively as a standalone purchase.

EarPods with a USB-C connector were introduced in September 2023 alongside the iPhone 15 series, following Apple's transition from Lightning to USB-C on iPhone models.

== Reception ==
Initial reviews of EarPods noted that they were a noticeable improvement over previous Apple headphones, particularly in comfort and overall sound quality. Wired wrote that the redesign delivered better sound than the earlier model while retaining the same low price point. Macworld similarly noted that poor fit was a common complaint about Apple's earlier earbuds, and described the new shape as an effort to address that issue while changing the earphones' perceived audio performance.

Later evaluations were more mixed, often describing EarPods as competent bundled earphones rather than enthusiast headphones. RTINGS characterized them as comfortable and portable, with sound suitable for casual listening but limited bass and few modern features compared with wireless alternatives. Reviewing the Lightning version, What Hi-Fi? argued that the sound would not satisfy audiophiles, criticizing its lack of detail and dynamics while still describing the earphones as suitable for short, everyday use.

Since the mid-2020s, wired headphones such as EarPods have been reported to have renewed interest after a period of widespread adoption of wireless models, including Apple's AirPods. Commentators have attributed the trend to cultural, practical, and stylistic factors, including their visibility as a fashion accessory, adoption by celebrities and influencers, perceived simplicity compared with battery-dependent devices, and nostalgia. Other cited factors include the lack of charging requirements, the reliability of wired connections, and lower cost compared with many Bluetooth alternatives, in the context of broader discussions about digital fatigue and retro revivals.

== See also ==
- Apple headphones
- AirPods
