= RTINGS =

Consumer technology reviewing website

RTINGS.com
- Company type: Private
- Website type: Ratings website
- Founded: 2011
- Founder: Cédric Demers
- Key people: Cédric Demers, President and CEO
- Employees: 70
- Website: www.rtings.com
- Registration: Optional

RTINGS (pronounced "ratings") is a Canadian website which performs and publishes data-based benchmarks of consumer electronics products. It rates individual attributes of a product, such as motion blur on a camera, and allows users to compare devices by these attributes. It also publishes the original data from its tests. The site purchases the products that it rates rather that accepting products given to the site by the product manufacturers.

Starting in March 2026, the website's full test results and in-depth product analysis, which were previously published for free, became exclusively available to paid subscribers.

== History ==
RTINGS was founded in 2011 by Cédric Demers, in his basement, originally as a website that compiled reviews from other websites, similar to Rotten Tomatoes. Initially, the website wasn't very successful and the founder was living off his savings from his prior job at Microsoft. RTINGS' first original review was a July 2013 review of a Samsung F5300 plasma TV.

As of 2026, RTINGS has reviewed over 4,400 products. RTINGS purchases the products itself, in order to avoid bias and to enable it to review budget models that are not ordinarily given to reviewers for free. It earns a commission when visitors reading a review click a link to buy the product being reviewed. Its business model also includes subscriber fees to access extra features. RTINGS reviews often tops search results for a given product.

On March 2, 2026, RTINGS announced that their full test results and in-depth product analysis, which were previously free, became exclusive to paid subscribers. RTINGS said the reason for this change was due to decreasing traffic from Google search results as well as uncredited scraping from AI.
