= SceneTap =

Data analytics and mobile application company

SceneTap, previously known as BarTabbers, was a data analytics, marketing services, and mobile application company launched in 2010. SceneTap started in Chicago, Illinois, and is currently based in Austin, Texas. The tool allows end users to view real-time data on crowd sizes, gender ratios, and the average age of patrons in a given location. In addition, it allows establishments to post live coupons and specials for users to purchase.

== Application and Website ==
SceneTap offers an administrative platform to operators of establishments, allowing operators to view reports and charts on their customers. Data is fed to its mobile application and website allowing users to view data on social venues such as bars, lounges, and coffee shops. The current network is primarily based in Chicago, IL, Bloomington, IN, and Austin, with expansion areas including Boston, Columbus, Ohio, New York, and Miami. The service most recently launched in San Francisco on Friday, May 18, 2012.

The mobile application and website also provide "real-time" specials on food and drink to end users, which are submitted by each establishment.

In late 2013, SceneTap Board of Directors restructured the company for a merger with BarVision, which continues today.

== Controversy ==
Media pundits and privacy advocates have raised questions around the technologies SceneTap utilizes to collect its information, particularly since it collects demographic information from people without their consent. The company points out its use of facial detection technology, which analyzes facial features to determine gender and approximate age - rather than attempting to collect personalized information or make an identification of that person.

In addition, the company maintains that its data collection is less intrusive to personal privacy than credit card transactions or identification scanners.
