= IPhone XS =

2018 smartphone by Apple

iPhone XS iPhone XS Max

- iPhone XS in Gold
- Developer: Apple
- Manufacturer: Foxconn (on contract)
- Type: Smartphone
- Generation: 12th
- First released: September 21, 2018; 8 years ago
- Availability by region: September 21, 2018: Australia; Austria; Belgium; Canada; China, Mainland; Denmark; Finland; France; Germany; Guernsey; Hong Kong; Ireland; Isle of Man; Italy; Japan; Jersey; Luxembourg; Mexico; Netherlands; New Zealand; Norway; Portugal; Puerto Rico; Saudi Arabia; Singapore; Spain; Sweden; Switzerland; Taiwan; United Arab Emirates; United Kingdom; United States; U.S. Virgin Islands; September 28, 2018: Andorra; Armenia; Bahrain; Bulgaria; Croatia; Cyprus; Czech Republic; Estonia; Georgia; Greece; Greenland; Hungary; Iceland; India; Kazakhstan; Kuwait; Latvia; Liechtenstein; Lithuania; Malta; Monaco; Oman; Poland; Qatar; Romania; Russia; Slovakia; Slovenia; South Africa; October 26, 2018: Chile; Colombia; Malaysia; Philippines; Thailand; November 1, 2018: Israel; November 2, 2018: Brunei; Cambodia; Macau; South Korea; Vietnam; November 9, 2018: Brazil; November 16, 2018: Turkey
- Discontinued: September 10, 2019; 7 years ago
- Predecessor: iPhone X
- Successor: iPhone 11 Pro / iPhone 11 Pro Max
- Related: iPhone XR
- Compatible networks: GSM, CDMA2000, EV-DO, HSPA+, LTE, LTE Advanced
- Form factor: Slate
- Dimensions: XS: 143.6 × 70.9 × 7.7 mm (5.65 × 2.79 × 0.30 in); XS Max: 157.5 × 77.4 × 7.7 mm (6.20 × 3.05 × 0.30 in)
- Weight: XS: 177 g (6.2 oz); XS Max: 208 g (7.3 oz)
- Operating system: Original: iOS 12; Current: iOS 18.7.12, released November 9, 2026
- System-on-chip: Apple A12 Bionic
- Memory: 4 GB LPDDR4X
- Storage: 64, 256 or 512 GB NVMe
- Battery: XS: 2658 mAh Li-ion; XS Max: 3174 mAh Li-ion
- Rear camera: 12 MP, ƒ/1.8 aperture 4K video recording at 24, 30 or 60 FPS, 1080p at 30 or 60 FPS or 720p at 30 FPS
- Front camera: 7 MP, f/2.2 aperture, 1080p HD video recording
- Display: XS: 5.85 in (149 mm), 2436×1125 px XS Max: 6.46 in (164 mm), 2688×1242 px
- Sound: Stereo speakers with Spatial Audio and Dolby Atmos
- Connectivity: 802.11ac Wi-Fi, Bluetooth 5.0
- Water resistance: IP68, up to 2 m (6.6 ft) for 30 minutes
- Hearing aid compatibility: M3, T4
- Made in: China
- Other: FaceTime audio- or video-calling, Qi wireless charging, USB-C to Lightning (connector) fast charging, Voice over LTE
- Website: iPhone XS – Apple at the Wayback Machine (archived September 9, 2019)

The iPhone XS and iPhone XS Max (Note: Roman numeral "X" pronounced as "ten") are smartphones designed, developed, and marketed by Apple. Released as the twelfth-generation flagship models of the iPhone, they succeeded the iPhone X and were unveiled alongside the lower-end iPhone XR on September 12, 2018, during a keynote address by Apple CEO Tim Cook at the Steve Jobs Theater at Apple Park in Cupertino, California. Pre-orders began on September 14, 2018, with general availability starting September 21, 2018. The iPhone XS and XS Max introduced improvements over their predecessor, including enhanced processing power, dual-SIM functionality, improved water resistance, and stereo audio recording for video capture.

Apple positioned the iPhone XS and XS Max as premium devices, targeting consumers seeking cutting-edge performance and advanced features, while simultaneously offering the iPhone XR – a lower-cost alternative with the same Apple A12 Bionic chip, but an LCD IPS panel display and a singular camera.

Along with the iPhone XR, the iPhone XS and XS Max are the last iPhones to feature an uncentered Apple logo and the "iPhone" text on the back, as the iPhone 11 series and later removed the "iPhone" text and centered the Apple logo on the back.

Along with the iPhone 7 and iPhone 7 Plus, the iPhone XS and XS Max were discontinued on September 10, 2019, following the announcement of the 13th generation of iPhone: the iPhone 11, iPhone 11 Pro and 11 Pro Max.

The iPhone XS, along with the iPhone 6s and XR, supported seven major versions of iOS from iOS 12 through iOS 18, making it among the longest supported iPhones at the time. They were surpassed by the iPhone 11, 11 Pro and SE (2nd generation), which supported eight versions.

== Design ==
The iPhone XS Max (center) is a significantly larger version of the iPhone XS (left), challenging another phablet in terms of length, the Samsung Galaxy Note 8 (right).

The reverse of the iPhone XS (left) is almost near-identical vision to the iPhone X (right).

The XS, which is visually near-identical to the iPhone X, has a better system-on-a-chip: the A12 Bionic chip built with a 7 nm process. It has a 5.85 inch (149 mm) OLED display (marketed as 5.8 inch) with a resolution of 2436 × 1125 pixels (2.7 megapixels) at 458 ppi, dual 12-megapixel rear cameras, and one 7-megapixel front-facing camera.

Color	Name
	Silver
	Space Gray
	Gold

== Hardware ==
=== Battery and specifications ===
The iPhone XS Max has the same hardware and cameras, but a larger 6.46 inch (164 mm) OLED display (marketed as 6.5 inch) with a resolution of 2688 × 1242 pixels (3.3 megapixels) at 458 ppi and a larger battery (3,174 mAh). The XS has a smaller battery than the X, dropping to 2,658 mAh from 2,716 mAh. The XS' battery is a new single-cell L-shaped battery, while the iPhone XS Max battery remains two cells like the iPhone X. Apple said that the iPhone XS lasts up to 30 minutes longer than iPhone X, while the iPhone XS Max lasts up to 1.5 hours longer than iPhone X.

=== Face ID ===
Apple said that the devices have faster Face ID technology than the iPhone X. It was also announced in June 2019 at WWDC that Face ID on iPhones' X, XS, XS Max and XR would be made up to 30% faster with iOS 13, which was released on September 19, 2019.

=== Water resistance ===
The XS and XS Max are rated IP68 for dust and water resistance under IEC standard 60529, with Apple specifying a maximum depth of 2 meters and up to 30 minutes of submersion in water. This is an improvement over the IP67 water resistance of the iPhone 8 and X. Apple has performed tests in various liquids including chlorinated water, salt water, tea, wine, beer and juices.

=== Dual SIM technology ===
The XS and XS Max support dual SIMs through a nano-SIM and an eSIM. In mainland China, Hong Kong, and Macau, however, the XS Max comes with a dual nano-SIM tray (and no eSIM). The XS does not have a dual nano-SIM tray, so the eSIM functionality is enabled for use in Hong Kong and Macau, but not in mainland China.

=== SoC ===
The XS and XS Max use the A12 Bionic SoC, which consists of 6-core CPU (2x Vortex + 4x Tempest), 4-core GPU, and 8-core Neural Engine.

=== Software ===
The iPhone XS and XS Max originally shipped with iOS 12, and received iOS 13 through iOS 18. The XS and XS Max, alongside the iPhone 6s and 6s Plus, are the longest supported iPhones ever released, each receiving seven major versions of iOS.

=== Wireless charging ===
The wireless charging coil material was switched to copper to reduce charging time and power loss.

=== Rear camera upgrades ===
The iPhones' XS, XS Max, and XR are the first iPhones able to record stereo audio for videos.

Starting with the iPhone 2018 lineup (iPhones' XS, XS Max and XR), these cameras were updated to a 12MP (1/2.55") sensor size with a 1.4 μm pixel size, the same sensor and pixel size as the primary cameras of the Samsung Galaxy S10, Samsung Galaxy S9 Samsung Galaxy S8 Samsung Galaxy S7, Pixel 2, Pixel 3a and Pixel 3a XL, Pixel 3 and Pixel 3 XL, and the Moto X4.

== Software ==
The iPhone XS and XS Max shipped with iOS 12 on launch, and supports all major versions of the operating system up to iOS 18. The iPhone XS and XS Max, as well as the iPhone XR, do not support iOS 26 due to hardware limitations.

== Reception and issues ==
=== Reception and connectivity issues ===
The iPhone XS received generally positive reviews from critics after release. iPhone XS and XS Max users initially had issues with LTE, Wi-Fi reception and Bluetooth connections. Some experts claimed that a faulty antenna was to blame, and in response to many consumer complaints about iPhone XS/XS Max connectivity problems, Apple contacted users for help with their investigation. To resolve some problems with the XS/XS Max, Apple pushed the iOS 12.0.1 update on October 8, 2018, which, along with addressing the Chargegate issue, fixed a connectivity issue where Bluetooth could become temporarily unavailable on the XS/XS Max.

=== Chargegate ===
Users reported that the iPhone XS and XS Max would sometimes fail to charge by Lightning cable if it had been off for a while, and would only begin to charge if the screen was turned on. This was caused by a software bug with Apple's "Disable USB accessories when locked" setting, a feature intended to prevent unknown devices from accessing a user's content. The press dubbed the issue "Chargegate". This and a Bluetooth connectivity problem were fixed by iOS 12.0.1, released on October 8, 2018.

=== Camera issues (Beautygate) ===
Customers also reported seeing unrealistic smoothness on their skin when taking a selfie with an automatic filter, an effect associated with the XS and XS Max's new Smart HDR camera feature. This technology combines multiple photos of varying exposures to increase dynamic range on the iPhones' photos, but can also reduce facial imperfections and highlights in selfies. Some, who speculated this was the result of a hidden "beauty mode" (an actual feature in some smartphones), dubbed the issue "Beautygate". There was a general dispute in the community as to whether the camera actually "intended" to "perfect" faces or if they just appeared that way as a result of a better-quality camera.

Apple said that these results were due to the Smart HDR algorithm incorrectly selecting the blurrier long exposure as its base frame instead of the sharpest short exposure. The issue was resolved with the release of iOS 12.1 on October 30, 2018.

The iPhone XS' camera was criticized for not featuring a night mode. iOS 13 did not include night mode which was kept exclusive to the then-new iPhone 11. However, third-party apps brought similar Night Mode to older iPhones.

== See also ==
- History of iPhone
- iPhone XR
- List of iPhone models
- Timeline of iPhone models

== Notes ==
Preceded by iPhone X	iPhone; 12th generation alongside iPhone XR	Succeeded by iPhone 11 Pro / 11 Pro Max
