= YellowTAB =

German software firm

yellowTAB
- Industry: Software development
- Defunct: 2006
- Headquarters: Mannheim, Germany
- Key people: Bernd Korz
- Website: yellowtab.com

yellowTAB was a German software firm that produced an operating system called "yellowTAB ZETA". While the operating system was based on BeOS 5.1.0, the company never publicly confirmed that it has the BeOS source code or what their licensing agreement with BeOS's owners PalmSource was. The company went insolvent and ceased trading in 2006. Later, David Schlesinger, directory of Open Source technologies at ACCESS, Inc., which had meanwhile become the owner of the BeOS source code, stated that there had never been a license agreement covering yellowTAB's use of the source code and that ZETA was therefore an infringed copy.

The company's offices were in Mannheim, and its corporate motto was Assume The Power. Following their closure, the OS was taken over by magnussoft, who started selling it as "magnussoft ZETA".

yellowTAB has come under some criticism from the BeOS userbase, who claim that the company did not give back what it took from the Haiku project and other open source BeOS projects. In many cases, open source programmers have recreated yellowTAB's extensions to BeOS, most notably their SVG graphics extensions to OpenTracker. However, yellowTAB's actions to date have not violated the BSD/MIT licences under which most open source BeOS projects exist.

In March 2006, yellowTAB donated their "Intel Extreme" driver to one of the Haiku developers for integration into the Haiku source tree where further development was to take place. Both yellowTAB and Haiku developers were to collaborate on Intel Extreme Graphics driver development, but to date this code has not yet been committed to the repository.

In April 2006, insolvency protection proceedings were filed for the company, although employees denied that it was actually filed by the company, suggesting potential malicious intent. However, the firm has transferred development and support of ZETA to a third-party, magnussoft.
