= TuneTracker =

Broadcasting automation software suite

- Developer: Dane Scott
- Release: 2000
- Stable release: TuneTracker 6.1 / November 1, 2022; 3 years ago
- Operating system: BeOS, Zeta, Haiku
- Type: Broadcast automation
- Website: tunetrackersystems.com

TuneTracker is a software suite for automated radio broadcasting.

== History ==
The Tunetracker System radio automation software was created in the late 1990s—early 2000s by Dane Scott. Tunetracker ran on Be, Inc's BeOS, a multimedia operating system.

The first commercial release was simply called "TuneTracker" and came with the radio automation program, a music scheduler called TuneStacker, and a background recording program named "TimeTracker". Also included were 24/7 jitter free playout, MakeMyDay, Lightning and LINE IN. Later came TuneTracker 2, and a commercial Traffic-enabled version called TuneTracker 2 Pro that also added satellite switcher control.

In June 2006, a version of TuneTracker automation called "Command Center" was released and it has been updated every year since.

In 2016, the SignalCaster app for iPad was added to the TumeTracker range, allowing for remote broadcast management. TuneTracker now runs on open source operating system Haiku OS.

== BeOS radio ==
Dane Scott is an active member of the BeOS/Haiku community. For almost 20 years, he has been broadcasting news from the BeOS community on the internet through his radio station BeOSradio using his TuneTracker system.

== See also ==
- Broadcast automation
- Radio software
- Haiku OS
