= Ayumu Saito =

Japanese playwright (1964–2025)

- 斎藤 歩
- Born: 20 December 1964; Kushiro, Hokkaido, Japan
- Died: 11 June 2025 (aged 60); Sapporo, Hokkaido, Japan
- Occupations: Playwright; director; actor; theatre producer
- Years active: 1990s - 2025
- Agent: Knockout
- Height: 181 cm (5 ft 11 in)

Ayumu Saito (斎藤 歩, Saitō Ayumu; 20 December 1964 – 11 June 2025) was a Japanese playwright, director, actor and theatre producer. He was represented by Knockout. Saito was also the director of the Japan Directors Association.

Saito died on 11 June 2025, at the age of 60, following a struggle with urothelial carcinoma.

== Filmography ==
=== Stage ===
Title	Creator	Producer	Notes
Life of Galileo	Bertolt Brecht	Osamu Matsumoto	
Three Sisters	Anton Chekhov	Osamu Matsumoto	
Amerika	Franz Kafka	Osamu Matsumoto	
Little Women	Louisa May Alcott	Osamu Matsumoto	
Fuyu no Bayer	Ayumu Saito		
Caucasian White Circle Ring	Bertolt Brecht	Kazuyoshi Kushida	
Turtle or....	Frigyes Karinthy	Ayumu Saito	Also adapted
The Winter's Tale	William Shakespeare	Ayumu Saito	
Whispering Voice	Joe Penhall	Osamu Matsumoto	
Andante Cantabile –Aruku Haya-sa de Utau yō ni–	Osamu Matsumoto		Also did the music
Tragedy of King Lear	William Shakespeare	Makoto Sato	
The Cherry Orchard	Anton Chekhov	Hirotaka Kumahayashi	
Engeki Kikaku Shūdan The Gajira Waga Tōsō	Tatsuo Kaneshita		
Saisen 11-jō no Aria	Ayumu Saito		
Uncle Vanya at 43°N	Anton Chekhov	Ayumu Saito	
The Trial/Der Verschollene	Franz Kafka	Osamu Matsumoto	
The Dying King	Eugène Ionesco	Makoto Sato	
Theater Company Caramelbox The Devotion of Suspect X	Keigo Higashino	Yutaka Narui	As Shunpei Kusanagi

=== Films ===
Date	Title	Role	Distributor	Notes
2 February 2002	Consent	Tsuno		
7 September 2002	Kinyū Hametsu Nippon: Tōgenkyō no Hitobito			
5 October 2002	Gunjō no Yoru no Umōfu			
12 October 2002	Gomen	Naoku Uryuu		
19 October 2002	Out	Sugimoto		
30 November 2002	Aiki			
7 December 2002	Doing Time	Factory manager Yokoyama		
18 January 2003	When the Last Sword Is Drawn	Itō Kashitarō		
15 February 2003	Fune o Oritara Kanojo no Shima	Sato		
23 August 2003	Ju-on: The Grudge 2			
4 October 2003	Onmyōji 2	Fujiwara no Kanemichi		
17 January 2004	Yudan Taiteki	Nekota		
20 March 2004	Kyō no Deki-goto			
29 May 2004	Heaven's Bookstore	Concert manager		
9 October 2004	is A.	Masaya Shiozaki		
16 October 2004	Marebito			
6 November 2004	Blood and Bones	Kyu Gensho		
27 November 2004	Nejirinbō	Naoto Imura		Lead role
19 March 2005	Hasami Otoko	Hidaka		
23 April 2005	Village Photobook			
4 June 2005	Niraikanai kara no Tegami	Sakiyama		
12 November 2005	No Pants Girls			
2005	Yoru no Cafe			
26 August 2006	Oyayubi sagashi			
30 September 2006	Dōshin			
21 October 2006	The Angel's Egg			
25 November 2006	Kurai to koro de Machiawase			
21 April 2007	Mizūmi			
2007	Kokoro			
27 October 2007	Crows Zero			
2008	Kanjō Kyōiku			
24 May 2008	After School			
24 May 2008	Sekai de Ichiban Utsukushī Yoru	Kenji Onizuka		
31 May 2008	Cyborg She	Girls High prisoner		
7 June 2008	God's Puzzle			
19 July 2008	One Million Yen Girl	Yuzo Kurosawa		
2008	Kikyō Presley			
25 October 2008	Cafe Daikanyama II Yume no Tsuzuki			
25 October 2008	Ichi			
20 December 2008	Someday's Dreamers	Sora's father		
20 December 2008	K-20: Legend of the Mask	Technical officer		
24 January 2009	Tabidachi: Ashoro yori	Ryoji Yamamoto		
7 March 2009	Yatterman			
11 August 2009	Crows Zero II			
3 July 2010	Lost Climb -Senkō-	Koshio Iijima		
28 August 2010	Flower and Snake 3			
25 September 2010	13 Assassins	Gambling Yazuka		
22 October 2010	Raiou		Toho	
22 January 2011	Inu to Anata no Monogatari: Inu no Eiga	Public health official		
29 January 2011	Journey Under the Midnight Sun	Hisashi Koga	Gaga/Wowow	
27 August 2011	Kamisama no Karute	Yokota		
11 February 2012	Ace Attorney			
2012	Ie o Tateru koto			
6 October 2012	Beyond Outrage			
17 November 2012	39 Settō-dan			
13 September 2013	Unforgiven			
22 March 2014	Akaneiro Clarinet			
2015	Koisuru Vampire			
2016	The Magnificent Nine	Dennosuke Yashima		
2016	Twisted Justice	Sakuraba		
2018	Recall			
2020	Hotel Royal			
2021	Utsusemi no Mori			

=== Anime films ===
Year	Title	Role	Ref.
2009	Summer Wars	Wabisuke Jinnouchi	

=== Direct-to-video ===
Year	Title	Notes
2000	Kishiwada Shōnen Gurentai Yakyū-dan	
2003	All Night Long: Initial 0	Lead role
2003	Jitsuroku Masahisa Takenaka no shōgai: Ara-ra Buru shishi: Zenpen	As Hideo Takenaka
2006	Kyōkatsu koso, Waga Jinsei	
2006	Cosplay no Hito	

=== TV dramas ===
1999

Title	Network
Getsuyō Drama Special Kuniko Mukōda Shūsen Tokubetsu Kikaku Asaki Yumemishi	TBS

2001

Title	Network	Notes
Hero	CX	Episode 8
Doyō Wide Gekijō Kyoto B-kyū Gourmet Satsujin Menu	EX	
Hamidashi Keiji Jōnetsukei	EX	Part 6 Episode 7

2002

Title	Role	Network	Notes
Drama D Mode Kanojotachi no Kemono Igakunyūmon		NHK	
Kayō Suspense Gekijō 1000-Kai Toppa Kinen Sakuhin Seicho Matsumoto Special: Kichiku	Requestor of flyer printing	NTV	
Yonimo Kimyōna Monogatari 02 Aki no Tokubetsu-hen "Saiyō Shiken"	No. 52	CX	
Getsuyō Drama Special Mei Tantei Catherine 12: Sakamoto Ryōma Satsujin Jiken		TBS	
Trick 2		EX	Episodes 3 and 4
Mibu Gishiden		TX	
Onna to Ai no Mystery Mīra ga Yonde iru		TX	

2003

Title	Network	Notes
Itan no Natsu		
TV Tokyo Drama Special Love Letter		
NHK Hokkaido Special Documentary Kao		Regular
Otorisōsa-kan Shiho Kitami 7		
Paradise Ticket	FBS	
Onsen Nakai Tantei 2	TBS	
Jikū Keisatsu Sōsaikka Part 3	NTV	
Ryōma ga yuku	TX	

2004

Title	Network	Notes
Ten-kiri Matsu: Yami ga tari	CX	
Obasan Deka	CX	Episode 13

2005

Title	Role	Network	Notes
Onna to Ai no Mystery Seicho Matsumoto Tokubetsu Kikaku Kuroi Gashū Himo	Takashi Saegusa	TX	
Kayō Suspense Gekijō Jiken Kisha Yuta Mikami 3	Masahiko Mochizuki	NTV	
Drama Complex Tsugunosuke Kawai: Kakenuketa Sō Ryū		NTV	
Kinyō Entertainment Kyoto Gion-iri Muko Keiji Jiken-bo 12		CX	
Monochrome no Hanten	Toda	TBS	
Haru to Natsu: Todokanakatta Tegami		NHK	Broadcast 80th anniversary large drama
Ai no Gekijō Byōin e Ikō		TBS	
Tsugunosuke Kawai: Kakenuketa Sō Ryū	Teizo Sakai	NTV	

2006

Title	Network	Notes
Tenka Sōran: Tokugawa Mitsuyo no Inbō	TX	New Year's Era Drama
Tokumei! Keiji don Kame	TBS	
Gakincho: Return Kids	TBS	
Cupsel	CX	
Mokuyō Jidaigeki Jirochō Seoi Fuji	NHK	
Drama Complex Watashi ga Watashidearu tame ni	NTV	

2007

Title	Role	Network	Notes
Torihada: Yofukashi no anata ni Zokutto suru Hanashi o		CX	Episode 6 "Soko ni aru Yokubō to Shōdō no Yami"
Suiyō Mystery 9 Ryokō Sakka Jiro Chaya 7	Takahiko Matsunaga	TX	
Yagyuu Jūbee Nanaban Shōbu: Saigo no Tatakai		NHK	Episode 5
Shūkan Jiro Akagawa: Utsukushī Yami		TX	
Shikaku Ukeoinin		TX	
Aibō		EX	Aired on 14 Nov; Season 6 Episode 4 "Taxi"

2008

Title	Role	Network
Bloody Monday	Junichiro Kamata	TBS

2009

Title	Role	Network	Notes
Boss	"Black moon" executive in prison	CX	Episodes 12–11
Saru Lock#Television drama		YTV/NTV	Episode 13–14
Doyō Drama Gaiji Keisatsu	Taisei Takizawa	NHK	
Mokuyō Night Drama Bōchō Mania 09: Saiban-chō! Koko wa Chōeki 4-nen de dō suka	Tomoya Kagami	NTV	

2010

Date	Title	Role	Network	Notes
	Doyō Jidaigeki Sakuyako no Hana	Official	NHK	Final Episode
	Zettai Reido	Masafumi Asai	CX	Episode 10
	Joker: Yurusa rezaru Sōsa-kan	Takeshi Nadaki	CX	
	GM: Odore Doctor	Professor Saeki	TBS	Episodes 9–10
13 Sep	Getsuyō Golden Keibu Kyosuke Tsuge	Yasunari Hyodo	TBS	
	The Ancient Dogoo Girl	Manager Yamato / Yokai Skinship	MBS	
17 Oct	Taiga drama Ryōmaden	Kishū Domain clan, Okamoto Hakuro	NHK	Episode 42 "Iroha Maru Jiken"
Oct–Dec 2012		Katsuo Tajiri	TX	

2011

Title	Role	Network	Notes
Hanchō: Jinnan-sho Asaka Han	Yuichi Mochizuki	TBS	Series 4: Seigi no Daishō, Episode 3
Control: Hanzai Shinri Sōsa	Kenji Takizawa	CX	Episodes 8–9
Umareru.	Eita Nakano	TBS	
Honto ni atta Kowai Hanashi: Natsu no Tokubetsu-hen 2011		CX	"Akumu no Jū San-nichi"
Kikyō	Masafumi Saito	TBS	

2012

Date	Title	Role	Network
	Shinshun Wide Jidaigeki Chūshingura: Sono Yoshi Sono ai	Yanagisawa Yoshiyasu	TX
	Unmei no Hito	Yuzo Torii	TBS
30 Jan	Getsuyō Golden Keishi Seiji Fukamachi: Ōkami wa Tenshi no Nioi	Inspector Atsushi Hirakubo	TBS
10 Dec	Getsuyō Golden Akakabu Kenji Funsenki 4	Shu Nunoura	TBS

2013

Dates	Title	Role	Network	Notes
14 Jan	Getsuyō Golden Seicho Matsumoto Botsugo 20-nen Special Kanryū	Kato	TBS	
	Getsuyō Drama Special Made in Japan	Tai Igarashi	NHK	
4 Feb	Getsuyō Golden Joi Misa Saotome: Glass no Kaidan	Fujita	TBS	
	Momeru Mon ni wa Fuku Kitaru	Kazuki	CX	
	Detarame Hero		NTV	Episode 1
24 Apr	Iryū sōsa	Hideo Kakei	EX	3rd Series Episode 2
8 Jul	Getsuyō Golden Keishi Seiji Fukamachi 2 Satsujin-sha ni Love Song o	Inspector Atsushi Hirakubo	TBS	
Aug–Sep	Na mo naki Doku	Hiroshi Hagiwara	TBS	
25 Nov	Kō no tori no yuri kago: "Akachan Post" no 6-nenkan to Sukuwa reta 92 no Inochi no Mirai	Ministry of Health, Labor and Welfare official	TBS	

2014

Dates	Title	Role	Network	Notes
Jan–Mar	Inpei Sōsa	Eisuke Shimohira	TBS	Episodes 3, 5, 10, 11
21 Mar	Yoru no sensei	Sameshima	TBS	Final Episode
28 Apr	White Lab: Keishichō Tokubetsu Kagaku Sōsahan	Shigeo Maki	TBS	Episode 3
28 Jun	55-Sai kara no Hello Life	Cameraman	NHK	Episode 3
17 Jul	Zero no Kansatsu-i Mao Matsumoto	Tadakatsu Mikami	EX	Episode 1
10 Dec	Suiyō Mystery 9 Zaika	Masahiro Morioka	TX	
20 Dec	Doyō Wide Gekijō Yame Jen no Onna 5	Tsutomu Aihara	ABC	

2015

Dates	Title	Role	Network	Notes
Jan–Feb	Iron Grandma	Yanagisawa	NHK BS Premium	
11, 18 Feb	Aibō	Makoto Mizoguchi	EX	Season 13 Episodes 15 "Ayukawa Kyōju Saigo no Jugyō" and 16 "Ayukawa Kyōju Saigo no Jugyō Kaiketsu-hen"
14 Feb	Doyō Wide Gekijō Hōigaku Kyōshitsu no Jiken File 40	Mitsuhiko Matsumura	EX	
26 Aug	Beat: Keishichō Kyōkō-han Ken Higuchi	Tamio Negishi	TX	
31 Oct	Doyō Wide Gekijō Shihō Kyōkan Yoshiko Hotaka 4	Koji Hayama	EX	
16 Dec	Nōgyō Joshi wa ra pe Musume	Yuka's father	NHK BS Premium	

2016

Date	Title	Role	Network
28 Mar	Getsuyō Golden Asami Mitsuhiko Series 35	Keiji Tsuchida	TBS
2 Oct	Drama Special v	Minoru Takeshita	EX

2017

Title	Role
Sasurai Shochō: Shohei Kazama 13	Kazushi Motokawa

=== Other television ===
Title	Notes
Kagai Jugyō: Yōkoso Senpai "Oku e Oku e: Kokoro no Oku e –Shijin Masayo Koike–"	Narrator

=== Advertisements ===
Product	Notes
Rover Company	Narrator
Japan Post "Postal Insurance Nagaiki-kun"	Narrator
kanebo "Akai Bihaku Essence"	Narrator
Sony "Vaio"	Narrator
Kao Corporation "Healthya green tea"	Narrator
Subaru Outback	
Nissan Lafesta	
Hitachi Flora Prius	
Häagen-Dazs "Dolce"	
Nomura Securities	Company advert
Toyota	Company advert
