= Pe (text editor) =

Open-source text editor

- Pe logo, introduced in 2005
- Developer(s): Maarten Hekkelman
- Initial release: 1998
- Stable release: 2.4.3
- Repository: github.com/HaikuArchives/Pe
- Written in: C / C++
- Operating system: BeOS, Haiku
- Type: Text Editor
- License: MIT
- Website: https://github.com/olta/pe

Pe, short for Programmer's Editor, is an open source text editor for the Be Operating System (BeOS), Haiku and other BeOS-like operating systems, targeted towards source-code editing. It is conceptually based on the Macintosh Programmer's Workshop and BBEdit, both of which are editing programs for the Mac OS.

It can work as a basic source-level HTML editor, with some HTML auto-completion support, automatic updating of files included within other files, and direct FTP integration.

Pe was written by the Dutch programmer Maarten Hekkelman, who also wrote BDB, the source-level debugger for the BeOS, and the spreadsheet Sum-It!, first for classic Mac OS and later BeOS where it was packaged by Beatware as half of BeBasics. Originally it was a commercial product sold on BeDepot for $50. Later after being open sourced, it came preloaded with the first alpha release of Haiku in 2009. Hekkelman also ported Pe to Macintosh under the name Pepper, until he ended development in 2002.

Pe was used to write the BeOS Bible, as well as In the Beginning... Was the Command Line by Neal Stephenson, both of which mention it.
