= IEC Electronics =

Electronic contract manufacturing company

IEC Electronics Corp.
- Company type: Private
- Traded as: Nasdaq: IEC
- Industry: Technology, Printed circuit boards
- Founded: 1966; 60 years ago as Intercontinental Electronics Corp.
- Fate: Acquired by Creation Technologies
- Headquarters: Newark, New York, United States
- Area served: United States
- Key people: Jeff Schlarbaum (president & CEO); Thomas Barbato (CFO)
- Products: Electronic manufacturing services
- Revenue: $ 157.0M (10.22.19)
- Number of employees: 565 (9.30.17)
- Website: www.iec-electronics.com

IEC Electronics Corp. was set up in 1966 and now is based in Newark, New York. The company focuses on electronic contract manufacturing services (EMS), such as the circuit cards, loads of cable and wire harness assemblies, and precision sheet metal components, for military, aerospace, medical devices, and other industry markets. In addition, the company provides services like testing and detection of counterfeit electronic parts, component risk mitigation and advanced failure analysis. IEC Electronics acquired Southern California Braiding, Inc. in 2010 to further develop IEC’s subsidiary, IEC Electronics Wire and Cable, Inc.. The company also has another subsidiary, namely Albuquerque. In October 2021, the company was acquired by Creation Technologies.

== History ==
In June 2013, Glancy Binkow & Goldberg LLP, on behalf of investors of IEC, filed a class action lawsuit against the company for issuing false and/or misleading statements.

On February 17, 2015, the company received a deficiency letter from the New York Stock Exchange (NYSE). The reasons for deficiency included failure to file a quarterly report in a timely manner. The company has been actively trying to prevent its stock from being delisted. IEC had until May 11, 2015, to submit a plan to the NYSE. Failure to submit and follow its approved plan, would get it delisted.

In February 2018, IEC Electronics announced it would be building a new facility in Newark, New York to expand production capabilities. The new 150,000 square foot facility, which will be located at the Silver Hill Technology Park, is projected to open in mid-2020. This business expansion is expected to create 362 new jobs while retaining 463 positions in New York State.

== Products ==
All the related products are based on the company’s on-site analytical laboratories, real-time and automated data surveillance, component tracking systems, and the new product incubation centers, under ISO 9001:2008, ISO 13485 and ISO 14001 and many other standards, with Six Sigma to manage quality. In the market of medical, the company provides products like resuscitation systems, surgical navigation systems, imaging devices, and remote/wireless diagnostics; In the market of aerospace & defense, the company provides products like secured cockpit encryption systems, weapons/missile launch platforms, MRAP ground vehicles, UAV control systems, and rocket guidance & spacecraft navigation; In the market of Industrial & Transportation, the company provides products tracking & monitoring systems, railway signaling, bus/mass transit communication systems, commercial aircraft lighting, weather detection & ranging instruments.

== Awards ==
IEC Electronics received:

- Association for Manufacturing Excellence Manufacturing Excellence Award in 2011 and 2013;
- Small Business Subcontractor of the Year by NASA in 2010;
- Forbes Best Small Companies in America in 2012(6th), 2011(3rd), 2009(29th), IndustryWeek Best Plants in North America in 2010.
