= RADAR (audio recorder) =

Product line of professional digital multitrack recorders

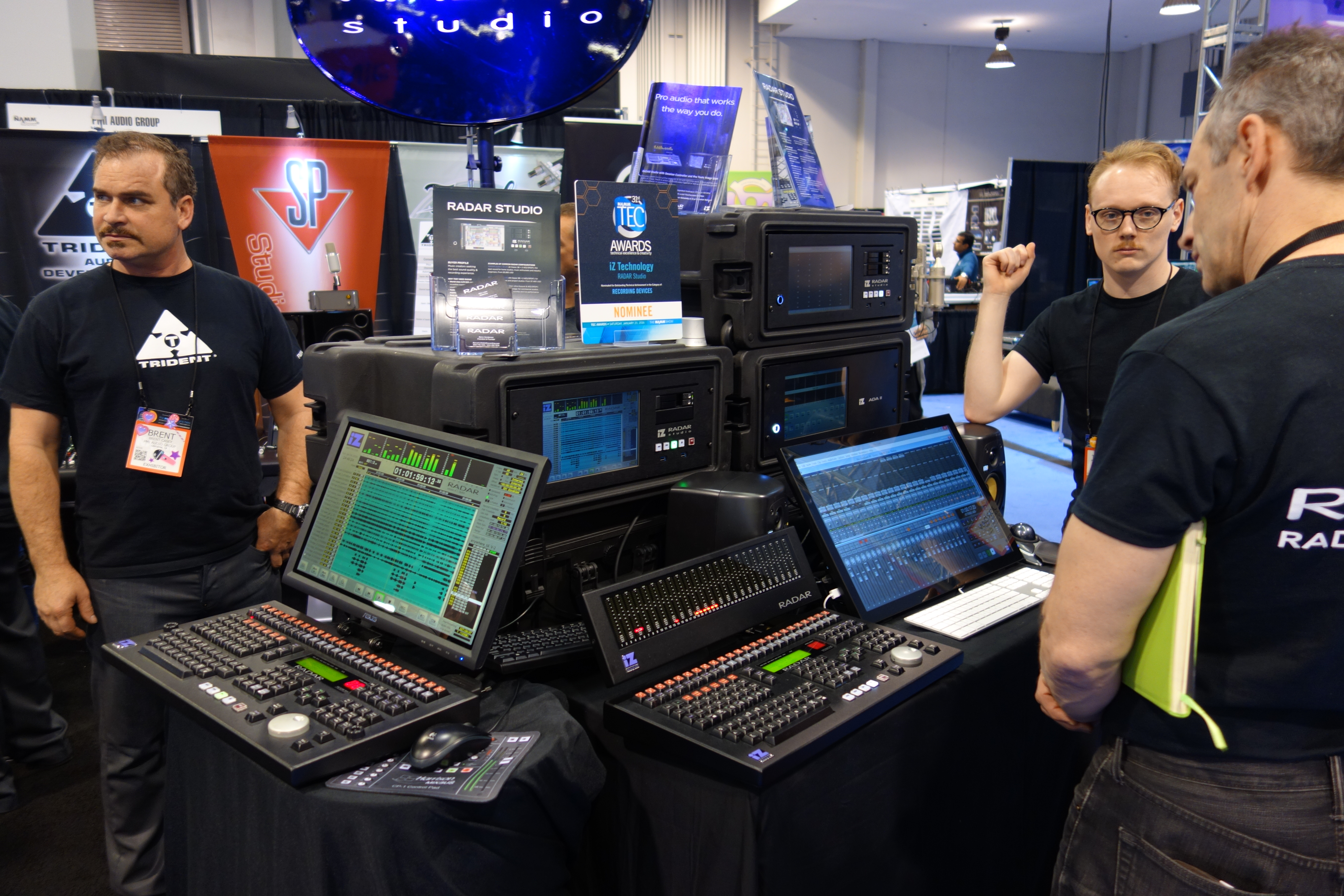
RADAR STUDIO product at 2016 NAMM Show

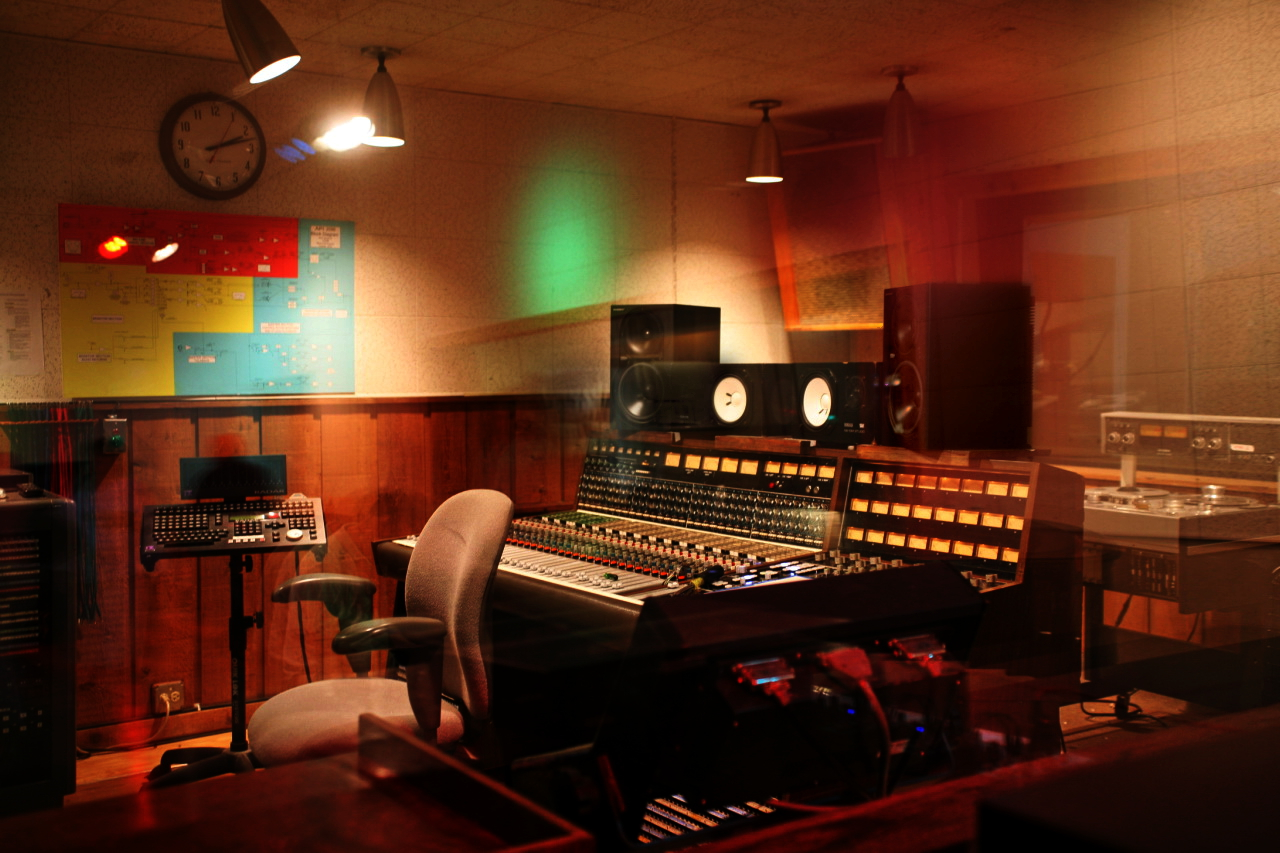
RADAR 24-track digital multitrack recorder on RCA Studio B control room

RADAR (Random Access Digital Audio Recorder) is a product line of professional digital multitrack recorders capable of recording and playing back twenty-four tracks of audio.

== History ==
The idea for RADAR was born out of Creation Studios, a high end music recording studio, built in North Vancouver by Barry and Jane Anne Henderson. Barry was also the Music Products Division Manager at Anatek Microcircuits, a hybrid manufacturer in North Vancouver, BC. Barry and his team developed the Anatek line of MIDI and audio products including the now famous line of small MIDI signal powered MIDI processing accessories called "Pocket Products". Pocket products were used world-wide by some of the most famous musicians in the world such as Stevie Wonder. The most famous of the Pocket Products, Pocket Merge, sold close to 10,000 units in 1989, the product launch year. In 1991, Barry used Creation Studios as a vehicle to fuel the development of RADAR, the world's first 24 track digital audio hard disk recorder. In 1993 - Creation showed RADAR at the October 1993 AES show in New York. Barry initially marketed RADAR under the Otari brand, and later under his own brand, iZ (iZ Technology Corporation). RADAR is now used world-wide by bands such as U2, and Neil Young, as well in large commercial facilities such as Disney, CBC, IMAX, and NBC. The first model, the Creation RADAR I, was released in 1993. RADAR I was manufactured in North Vancouver, BC by Creation Technologies (iZ Technology Corporation), but marketed and distributed in 1994 by Otari under an exclusive license. Creation/iZ also produced the RADAR II. iZ Technology terminated Otari's RADAR distribution agreement in 2000.

In October 2000, iZ Technology released RADAR 24 under the iZ brand, which was based on BeOS 5. In 2005, iZ released RADAR V. In 2012, iZ released RADAR 6 at the October 2012 AES show in San Francisco. In 2015, iZ released RADAR studio, the world's first DAW/Dedicated Recorder in a single box. In 2017, Barry sold the business to focus on other interests.

At the 2019 NAMM Show, Barry was awarded the 2019 TECnology Hall of Fame award for the development of RADAR I, the world's first 24 track digital audio hard disk recorder. Founded in 2004 by George Petersen and presented since 2015 by the NAMM MUSEUM of Making Music, the TECnology Hall of Fame honors and recognizes audio products and innovations that have made a significant contribution to the advancement of audio technology. Inductees to the TECnology Hall of Fame are selected by a panel of more than 50 recognized audio experts, including authors, educators, engineers and other professionals. RADAR I was recognized by the TEC Hall of Fame as "the world’s first 24-track hard disk digital audio recorder" that as "the first marker of the digital revolution" and is quoted as saying that RADAR I "truly paved the way for the modern DAW and today’s digital recording studio."

Parallel to the development of the various hardware models, there have been many revisions to the RADAR system software.

== Hardware Models ==
=== RADAR I ===
The RADAR I was the first model released, under the Otari brand in 1994. It was capable of recording and playing back twenty-four tracks of 16 bit, 48k audio. It also was available with 24 Adat I/O Card.

=== RADAR II ===
The Otari RADAR II, released in 1997, was capable of recording and playing back twenty-four tracks of 24 bit, 48k audio on a single hard drive, editing and multiple-machine linking for up to 192 tracks. Until April 2000, the RADAR II was branded as the "Otari RADAR II." After April 2000, it was sold by iZ Technology as the "iZ RADAR II."

=== RADAR 24 ===
RADAR 24, released in 2000, was the first new model branded by iZ Technology, and brought many hardware improvements including: sample rates up to 192k, networking, a faster processor, and ADAT I/O.

=== RADAR V ===
RADAR V, released in 2005, added many capabilities to the RADAR 24 including the ability to record on all 24 tracks at high sample rates of 96k and 192k; direct recording to industry-standard Broadcast WAV files; Dual Disk and Span modes for recording to multiple drives; File Flattening options to consolidate audio for handoff; and Gigabit Ethernet file transfer. The model name "V" is pronounced "Vee," not "Five."

=== RADAR 6 ===
RADAR 6 was released in October 2012, with an entirely new, smaller, lighter and quieter form factor. The new model had a touch-screen interface and tactile transport keys on the front of the unit, and offered new storage options such as solid state drives, USB 3.0 drives and SD cards. At this time iZ also improved their AD/DA converter cards and consolidated to two card choices instead of three.

=== RADAR studio ===
RADAR studio, released in 2015, incorporated a 'Workstation' platform alongside the original RADAR software, allowing industry standard DAWs to be run on the RADAR, using RADAR as the host computer.

== Software Versions ==
As of 2012, two RADAR software systems have been developed for RADAR V and RADAR 24. Software version 4.0 and up is currently under development for the RADAR 6 platform. 3.5x, iZOS, the first version of which was released in July 2008, requires a new system drive and a processor rated at a minimum of 800 MHz, and is no longer being developed. 3.4x is the older BeOS version of the operating system, which is also no longer being developed.
