= Lindsay Goldberg =

American private equity firm

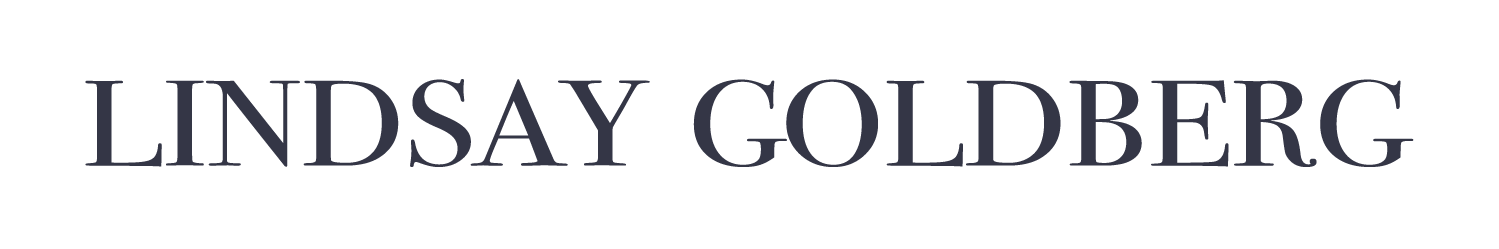
- Lindsay Goldberg Logo
- Type: Private
- Industry: Private equity
- Founded: 2001; 25 years ago
- Founder: Alan E. Goldberg, Robert D. Lindsay
- Headquarters: New York City, United States
- Products: Leveraged buyout, Growth capital
- Total assets: $20 billion
- Number of employees: Approximately 50-100 employees
- Website: www.lindsaygoldbergllc.com

Lindsay Goldberg (LGLLC) is an American private equity firm focused on leveraged buyout and growth capital investments in middle-market companies in such sectors as consumer products, commodity-based manufacturing, energy services, business services, healthcare, financial services, energy transmission and waste disposal. Lindsay Goldberg specializes in partnering with family-owned businesses, offering operational and strategic guidance.

== Synopsis ==
LGLLC, which is based in New York City, was founded in 2001 by Alan Goldberg, who had previously was chairman and CEO of Morgan Stanley Private Equity (later Metalmark Capital) and Robert Lindsay, who played a central role in the Bessemer Trust private equity business, most recently as Managing General Partner since 1991. Goldberg and Lindsay were founding members of Morgan Stanley's private equity business in 1984.

The firm has raised approximately $17 billion since inception, across five funds. The firm raised $2 billion for its first fund in 2002. In 2006, the firm completed fundraising for its second fund with $3.1 billion of investor commitments. In 2008, Lindsay Goldberg commenced raising its third fund with a target of $4.0 billion. As of November 2015, $3.4 billion had been raised toward its fourth fund. As of July 2020, $3.4 billion had been raised toward its fifth fund.

== Holdings ==
- Bedrock Industries, which was formed on 23 October 2015 by LGLLC, is "focused on owning and operating metals, mining and natural resources" companies and assets. It operates as a holding company and owns such properties as Stelco in conjunction with Fairfax Financial.
- Creation Technologies, a Vancouver-based service supplier to OEMs. The firm had as of August 2019 roughly 3,000 employees across the USMCA countries and China.
- Bilcare Research, which produces plastic packaging used in the pharmaceutical, consumer goods and chip card manufacturing industries
- MMS Holdings, data-focused clinical research organization (CRO) that supports the pharmaceutical, biotech, and medical device industries.
- In recent years, Lindsay Goldberg has acquired controlling interests in companies such as Golden State Foods (a major foodservice supplier), The Kleinfelder Group (an engineering services firm), and Summit Interconnect (a leader in printed circuit board manufacturing).
- In 2023, Lindsay Goldberg launched its sixth flagship fund, targeting $4 billion, continuing its focus on mid-market buyout opportunities.

== Advisors ==
Lindsay Goldberg has developed affiliate partnerships with a number of influential individuals and businesses in order to extend their reach, both geographically and by industries. These partners include:

- Tony Knowles, American politician, 7th Governor of Alaska
- Gary Edson, former advisor to the George W. Bush administration
- Stephen Jansen, former Vice Chairman of Aon Corporation
- Patrick Moore, former CEO of Smurfit-Stone Container
- Leonard Riggs, founder and former CEO of EmCare

== Litigations and legal investigations ==
Lindsay Goldberg has been associated with legal proceedings concerning its former portfolio company, Schur Flexibles, following allegations of financial misconduct during the period of its ownership. The firm sold an 80% stake in Schur Flexibles to the B&C Foundation for approximately 260 million euros. Subsequent internal investigations conducted by B&C suggested potential discrepancies in the company’s balance sheets prior to the transaction.

In response, Austrian authorities launched a criminal investigation into former members of Schur Flexibles’ senior management, as well as Thomas Unger, a Managing Director of Lindsay Goldberg Europe, GmBH.

Reports have alleged that Schur Flexibles' executives misused company funds for personal expenses, including luxury apartments and private travel, during Lindsay Goldberg's ownership. Lindsay Goldberg has stated that it was unaware of any financial irregularities at Schur Flexibles. The firm has emphasized its commitment to ethical business practices and is supportive of ongoing investigations aimed at ensuring accountability.

Despite the controversies, Lindsay Goldberg has continued its private equity operations, including raising its sixth flagship fund, which is targeting $4 billion, as reported in recent sources.
