= Magnussoft =

German computer game developer

magnussoft Deutschland GmbH
- Company type: GmbH
- Industry: Video games
- Founded: 1991 (magnussoft); 2004 (magnussoft Deutschland GmbH)
- Headquarters: Kesselsdorf, Germany
- Website: www.magnussoft.biz

magnussoft Deutschland GmbH is a German computer game developer and publisher. The company is seated in Kesselsdorf, close to the Saxon capital of Dresden.

In the 1980s magnussoft released collections of software for popular 8-bit home computer systems: Commodore 64, Amiga, Atari 8-bit computers, and Atari ST. The games can also run on newer computer systems, such as Intel-based IBM PCs, using emulators. There are collections of magnussoft games, one is called Retro-Classix that covers games available on multiple platforms, and other collections that specialize on one particular system, like the Amiga Classix or the C64 Classix.

The company released more than 160 products. Among their assortment are adventure games, board games, strategic games as well as shoot 'em up games and jump and runs. On the other hand, magnussoft also released computer applications and educational software. The software was brought under varied labels to the market in Germany, Austria, Switzerland, the Benelux countries, France, Great Britain, and the United States.

By 2008 magnussoft, had gained access to the software market, especially in the lower budget and middle price range. They cooperate with acquainted German partners like for example "ak tronik Software & Services", "KOCH Media", and the "Verlagsgruppe Weltbild". In addition magnussoft has founded more subsidiaries in other parts of Europe. However, magnussoft does not publish outside of Europe, they leave that work to local companies.

magnussoft have created their profile through the release of ZETA, a broad range of retro games, and classic computer games like Aquanoid, Barkanoid or Plot's.

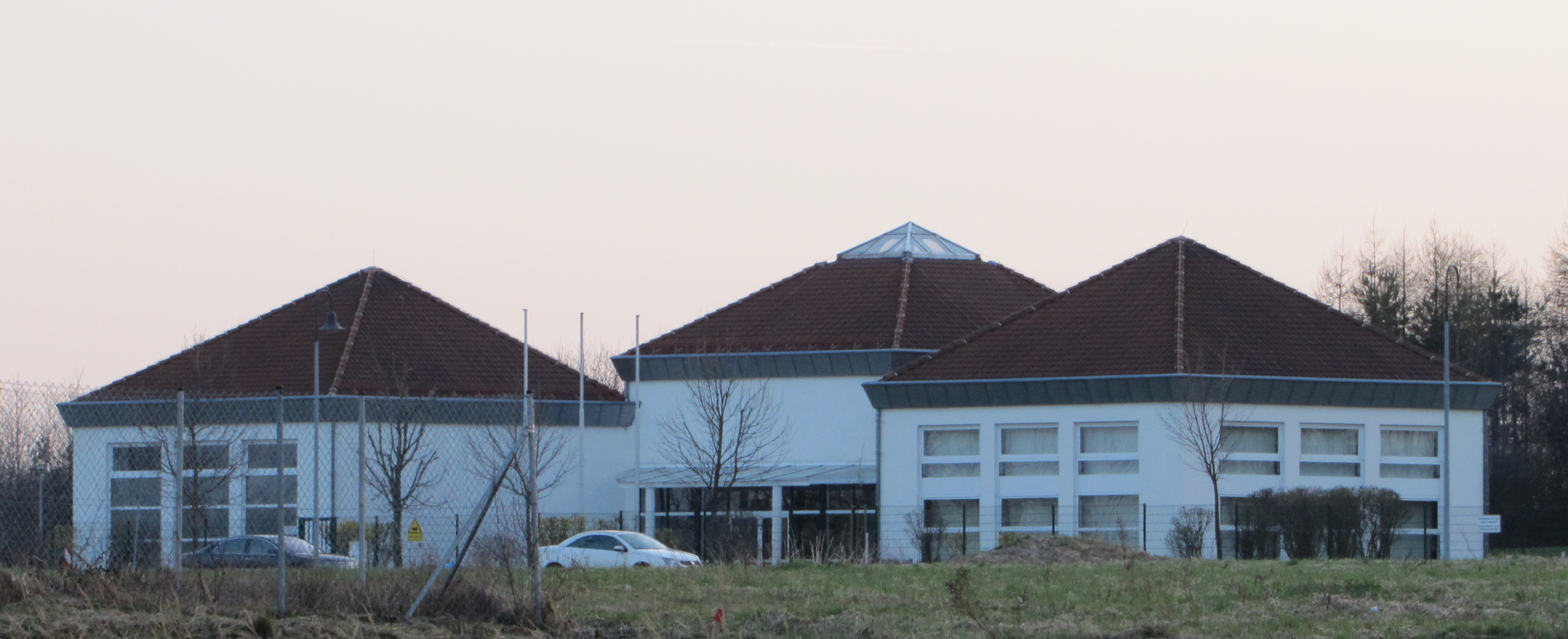
The headquarters of Magnussoft in Kesselsdorf

== Games (selection) ==
- Amiga Classix
- Aquanoid
- Barkanoid
- Boulder Match
- Break It
- BURN
- C64 Classix
- Colossus Chess
- Dr. Tool Serie
- Fix & Foxi Serie
- Jacks Crazy Cong
- Jump Jack
- KLIX
- METRIS
- MiniGolf
- Packs Serie
- PLOTS!
- Pool Island
- Retro-Classix
- Sokoman

== Applications (selection) ==
- Dr Brain series
- Dr. Tool series
- Driver Cataloger
- Easy Bootmanager
- Typing Tutor

== Educational software (selection) ==
- Deutsch, Englisch und Mathe für Zwerge
- Deutsch– und Mathe Compilation
- Fahrschule

== Criticism ==
In 2007 magnussoft incurred public criticism for ceasing the distribution and the funding of BeOS replacement Magnussoft Zeta OS because of its uncertain legal status.

== Trademarks ==
- Amiga Classix
- Aquanoid
- Barkanoid
- C64 Classix
- Dr. Brain
- Dr. Tool
- Retro Classix
