= Hitachi Flora Prius =

The Hitachi Flora Prius was a range of personal computers marketed in Japan by Hitachi, Ltd. during the late 1990s.

The Flora Prius was preinstalled with both Microsoft Windows 98 as well as BeOS. It did not, however, have a dual-boot option as Microsoft reminded Hitachi of the terms of the Windows OEM license. In effect, two thirds of the hard drive was hidden from the end-user, and a series of complicated manipulations was necessary to activate the BeOS partition.

== Models ==
FLORA Prius 330J came in three models:

- 330N40JB: Base version with no LCD
- 3304ST40JB: Included a 14.1-inch super TFT color LCD
- 3304ST40JBT: Included a 14.1-inch super TFT color LCD and WinTV Video capture board

== Base specifications ==
- CPU: Pentium II processor (400 MHz)
- RAM: 64 MB SDRAM
- Hard Drive: 6.4 GB (2 GB for Windows 98 and 4.6 GB for BeOS)
- CD-ROM Drive: 24X speed max.
- 100BASE-TX/10BASE-10
