= Creation Technologies =

American electronics manufacturing services company

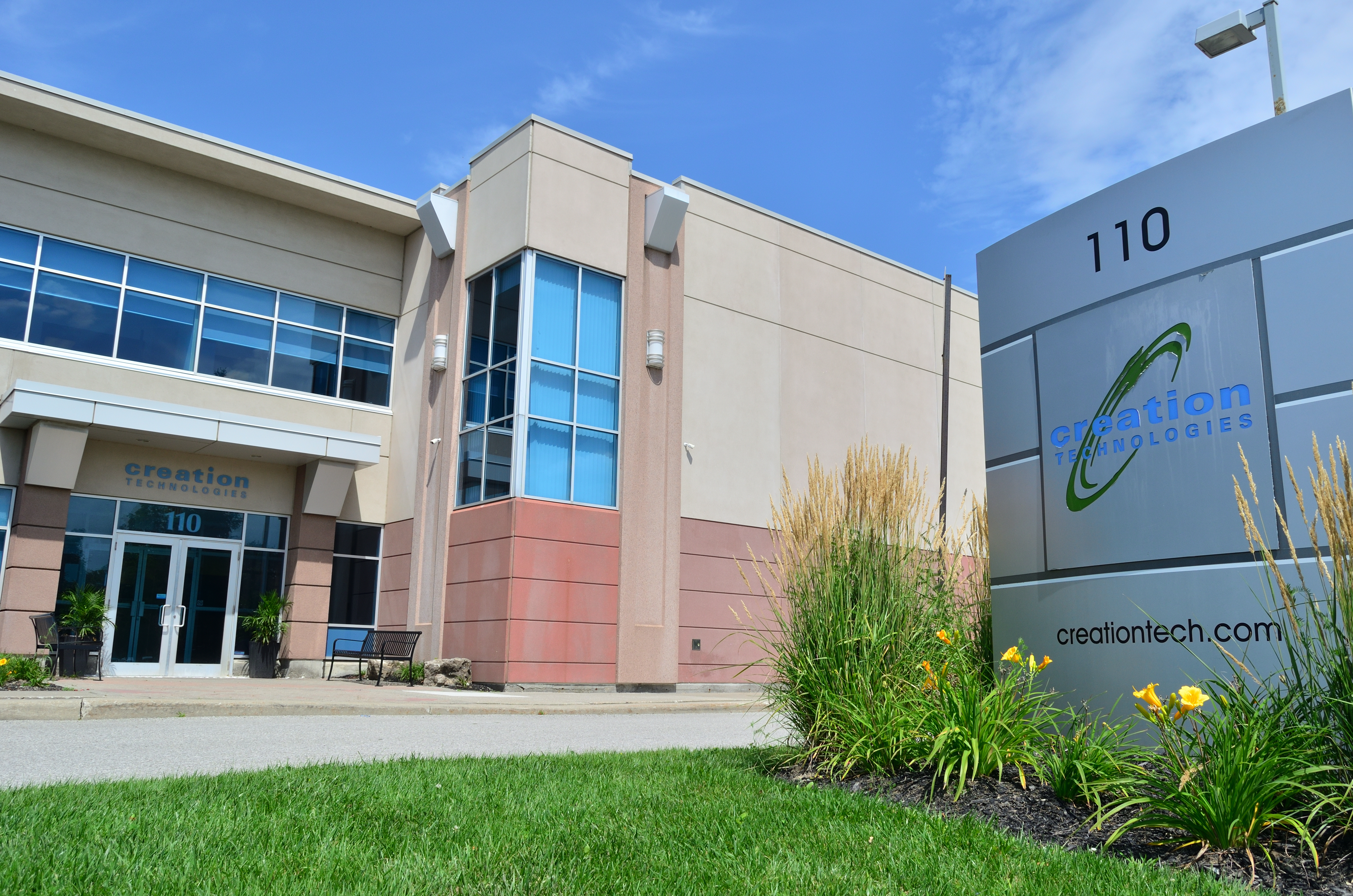
Creation Technologies office in Markham, Ontario

Creation Technologies is a privately held global electronics manufacturing services (EMS) provider headquartered in Boston, Massachusetts, United States. Creation provides electronics solutions to a group of original equipment manufacturers (OEMs) across North America and Asia, and has 13 manufacturing operations in Canada, the US, China and Mexico.

== History ==
In 1989, Creation Studios music recording studio was built in North Vancouver by Barry and Jane Anne Henderson. Barry Henderson was also the Music Products Division Manager at Anatek Microcircuits, a hybrid manufacturer in North Vancouver, BC. He and his team developed the Anatek line of MIDI and audio products, including the line of small MIDI signal-powered MIDI processing accessories called "Pocket Products".

In 1991, Henderson partnered with Geoff Reed, Paul Clark, and Dave Pettigrew using Creation Studios as a vehicle to purchase the assets of Anatek, changing the name of the newly combined entity to Creation Technologies. Creation directed themselves towards becoming a high quality global contract manufacturing enterprise and developer of RADAR, the world's first multi-track digital recording system for professional recording studios.

In 1993 Creation showed RADAR at the October 1993 AES show in New York. Creation initially marketed RADAR under the Otari brand and later under Henderson's iZ brand(iZ Technology Corporation).

Then in 1994, Creation officially launched the RADAR line of digital recording systems.

In 1996, the company expanded to Burnaby, BC and opened additional facilities. Two years later in 1998, they opened a new facility in Mississauga, ON.

In 2001, Creation purchased a manufacturing plant in Mississauga, ON, from AimGlobal and later combined this facility with its Mississauga operation.

Then in 2003, they opened a second Ontario facility in Markham, ON. Acquires Eder Industries in Milwaukee, WI. Before acquiring Second Source Systems of Dallas, TX, in 2004. That same year, they formed Creation Technologies Asia Pacific Ltd.

In 2006, they opened International Purchasing Office in Shenzhen, China. Acquires Asemtec, Inc of San Jose, CA. In 2007, acquired Taytronics, Inc of St. Peter, MN, and SMC, Inc, of Lexington, KY. In 2008 they acquired Circuit Services Inc of Chicago, IL, and CCSI of Changzhou, China, and ProWorks, Inc of Santa Clara, CA.

By 2012, Creation acquired Aisling Sources, Mexicali, Baja California, and ProWorks, Inc of Santa Clara, CA

On July 18, 2019, Creation announced that it would be acquired by US private investment firm Lindsay Goldberg.

On January 14, 2025, the Company announced that Patrick L. Freytag, who had been serving as Creation’s Chief Financial Officer, was appointed Chief Executive Officer. He succeeded Stephen P. DeFalco, who became Creation’s Executive Chairman. Megan Melusky, most recently Senior Vice President, Finance, was promoted to Chief Financial Officer.

== Operations ==
Creation has business units across North America and in China, with more than 3,000 employees as of 2023. The company is also part of the ems-Alliance, 5 EMS providers partnering to provide additional coverage for customer requirements in markets around the world.

Creation's services include design and new product introduction (NPI), PCBA and full integration manufacturing, order fulfillment services, supply chain solutions and after-market services (AMS). The company's certifications, registrations and regulatory agencies include ISO 9001, ISO 13485, ISO 14001, AS9100 for aerospace, FDA, CSA, UL, TUV, FM, CE, and MET, and its facilities have obtained International Traffic in Arms (ITAR) and Controlled Goods Directorate (CGD) registrations.

=== Locations ===
Creation's manufacturing operations in Canada:

- Burnaby, British Columbia
- Markham, Ontario
- Mississauga, Ontario

Creation's manufacturing operations in the United States:

- Rochester, New York
- Dallas, Texas
- St. Peter, Minnesota
- Milwaukee, Wisconsin
- Boise, Idaho
- Albuquerque, New Mexico
- Everett, Washington
- Denver, Colorado

Creation's manufacturing operations in China:

- Changzhou, Jiangsu Province

Creation's manufacturing operations in Mexico:

- Hermosillo, Sonora
