= BeOS =

Operating system for personal computers

- BeOS R5
- Developer: Be Inc.
- Written in: C++
- Working state: Discontinued
- Source model: Proprietary
- Initial release: October 3, 1995; 31 years ago
- Latest release: R5.0.3 / May 26, 2000; 26 years ago
- Available in: English, Japanese
- Supported platforms: IA-32; PowerPC
- Kernel type: Hybrid kernel
- License: Proprietary
- Official website: beincorporated.com

BeOS is a discontinued operating system for personal computers that was developed by Be Inc. It was conceived for the company's BeBox personal computer which was released in 1995. BeOS was designed for multitasking, multithreading, and a graphical user interface. The OS was later sold to OEMs, retail, and directly to users; its last version was released as freeware.

Early BeOS releases are for PowerPC. It was ported to Macintosh, then x86. Be was ultimately unable to achieve a significant market share and ended development with dwindling finances, so Palm acquired the BeOS assets in 2001. Enthusiasts have since created derivate operating systems including Haiku, which will retain BeOS 5 compatibility as of Release R1.

== Development ==
BeOS is the product of Apple Computer's former business executive Jean-Louis Gassée, with the underlying philosophy of building a "media OS" capable of up-and-coming digital media and multi-processors. Development began in the early 1990s, initially designed to run on AT&T Hobbit-based hardware before being modified to run on PowerPC-based processors: first Be's own BeBox system, and later Apple Computer's second generation and onwards Power Macintosh family, with the hope that Apple would purchase or license BeOS as a replacement for its aging Mac OS.

The first version of BeOS shipped with the BeBox to a limited number of developers in October 1995. It supported analog and digital audio and MIDI streams, multiple video sources, and 3D computation. Developer Release 6 (DR6) was the first officially available version.

The BeOS Developer Release 7 (DR7) was released in April 1996. This includes full 32-bit color graphics, "workspaces" (virtual desktops), an FTP file server, and a web server.

DR8 was released in September 1996 with a new browser with MPEG and QuickTime video formats. It supports OpenGL, remote access, and Power Macintosh.

In 1996, Apple Computer CEO Gil Amelio started negotiations to buy Be Inc., but stalled when Be CEO Jean-Louis Gassée wanted $300 million and Apple offered $125 million. Apple's board of directors preferred NeXTSTEP and purchased Steve Jobs's NeXT instead.

The final developer's release introduced a 64-bit file system. BeOS Preview Release (PR1), the first for the general public, was released in mid 1997. It supports AppleTalk, PostScript printing, and Unicode. The price for the Full Pack was $49.95. Later that year, Preview Release 2 shipped with support for Macintosh's Hierarchical File System (HFS), support for 512MB RAM, and improvements to the user interface.

Release 3 (R3) shipped in March 1998 (initially $69.95, later $99.95), as the first to be ported to the Intel x86 platform in addition to PowerPC, and the first commercially available version of BeOS. The adoption of x86 was partly due to Apple's moves, with Steve Jobs stopping the Macintosh clone market, and Be's mounting debt.

BeOS Release 4 had a claimed performance improvement of up to 30 percent. Keyboard shortcuts were changed to mimic those of Windows. However it still lacked Novell NetWare support. It also brought additional drivers and support for the most common SCSI controllers on the x86 platform - from Adaptec and Symbios Logic. The bootloader switched from LILO to Be's own bootman.

In 2000, BeOS Release 5 (R5) was released. This was split between a Pro Edition, and a free version known as Personal Edition (BeOS PE) which was released for free online and by CD-ROM. BeOS PE could be booted from within Windows or Linux, and was intended as a consumer and developer preview. Also with R5, Be open sourced elements of the user interface. Be CEO Gassée said in 2001 that he was open to the idea of releasing the entire operating system's source code, but this never materialized.

Release 5 raised BeOS's popularity but it remained commercially unsuccessful, and BeOS eventually halted following the introduction of a stripped-down version for Internet appliances, BeIA, which became the company's business focus in place of BeOS. R5 is the final official release of BeOS as Be Inc. became defunct in 2001 following its sale to Palm Inc. BeOS R5.1 "Dano", which was under development before Be's sale to Palm and includes the BeOS Networking Environment (BONE) networking stack, was leaked to the public shortly after the company's close.

=== Version history table ===
Release	Date	Hardware
Developer Release 4	Prototype	AT&T Hobbit
Developer Release 5	October 1995	PowerPC
Developer Release 6	January 1996	PowerPC
Developer Release 7	April 1996	PowerPC
Developer Release 8	September 1996	PowerPC
Developer Release 9 (Advanced Access Preview Release)	May 1997	PowerPC
Preview Release 1	June 1997	PowerPC
Preview Release 2	October 1997	PowerPC
Release 3	March 1998	PowerPC and Intel x86
R3.1	June 1998	PowerPC and Intel x86
R3.2	July 1998	PowerPC and Intel x86
Release 4	November 4, 1998	PowerPC and Intel x86
R4.5 ("Genki")	June 1999	PowerPC and Intel x86
Release 5 ("Maui") Personal Edition/Pro Edition	March 28, 2000; May 26, 2000 (5.0.3)	PowerPC and Intel x86
R5.1 ("Dano")	Leaked	Intel x86

== Hardware support and licensees ==
After the discontinuation of the BeBox in January 1997, Power Computing began bundling BeOS (on a CD-ROM for optional installation) with its line of PowerPC-based Macintosh clones. These systems can dual boot either Mac OS or BeOS, with a start-up screen offering the choice. Motorola also announced in February 1997 that it would bundle BeOS with their Macintosh clones, the Motorola StarMax, along with MacOS. DayStar Digital was another licensee.

BeOS is compatible with many Macintosh models, but not PowerBook.

With BeOS Release 3 on the x86 platform, the operating system is compatible with most computers that run Windows. Hitachi is the first major x86 OEM to ship BeOS, selling the Hitachi Flora Prius line in Japan, and Fujitsu released the Silverline computers in Germany and the Nordic countries. Be was unable to attract further manufacturers due to their Microsoft contracts. Be closed in 2002, and sued Microsoft, claiming that Hitachi had been dissuaded from selling PCs loaded with BeOS. The case was eventually settled out of court for $23.25 million with no admission of liability on Microsoft's part.

== Architecture ==
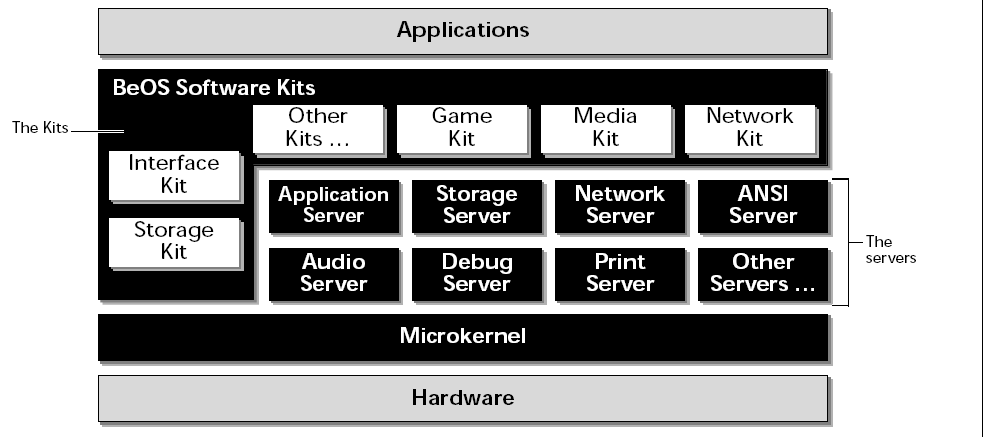
The BeOS architecture

BeOS was developed as an original product, with a proprietary kernel, symmetric multiprocessing, preemptive multitasking, and pervasive multithreading. It runs in protected memory mode, with a C++ application framework based on shared libraries and modular code. Be initially offered CodeWarrior for application development, and later EGCS.

Its API is object oriented. The user interface was largely multithreaded: each window ran in its own thread, relying heavily on sending messages to communicate between threads; and these concepts are reflected into the API.

BeOS uses modern hardware facilities such as modular I/O bandwidth, a multithreaded graphics engine (with the OpenGL library), and a 64-bit journaling file system named BFS supporting files up to one terabyte each. BeOS has partial POSIX compatibility and a command-line interface through Bash, although internally it is not a Unix-derived operating system. Many Unix applications were ported to the BeOS command-line interface.

BeOS uses Unicode as the default GUI encoding, and support for input methods such as bidirectional text input was never realized.

== Applications ==
BeOS is bundled with a unique web browser named NetPositive, the BeMail email client, and the PoorMan web server. Be operated the marketplace site BeDepot for the purchase and downloading of software including third party, and a website named BeWare listing apps for the platform. Some popular third-party BeOS apps include the Eddie text editor, Gobe Productive office suite, the Mozilla project, and multimedia apps like Cinema 4D. Quake and Quake II were officially ported, and SimCity 3000 was in development.

== Reception ==
Be did not disclose the number of BeOS users, but it was estimated to be running on between 50,000 and 100,000 computers in 1999, and Release 5 reportedly had over one million downloads. For a time it was viewed as a viable competitor to Mac OS and Windows, but its status as the "alternative operating system" was quickly surpassed by Linux by 1998.

Reception of the operating system was largely positive, citing its true and "reliable" multitasking and support for multiple processors. Though its market penetration was low, it gained a niche multimedia userbase and acceptance by the audio community. Consequently, it was styled as a "media OS" due to its well-regarded ability to handle audio and video. BeOS received significant interest in Japan, and was also appealing to Amiga developers and users, who were looking for a newer platform.

BeOS and its successors have been used in media appliances, such as the Edirol DV-7 video editors from Roland Corporation, which run on a modified BeOS and the TuneTracker Radio Automation software that used to run it on BeOS and Zeta, and it was also sold as a "Station-in-a-Box" with the Zeta operating system included. In 2015, Tunetracker released a Haiku distribution bundled with its broadcasting software.

== Legacy ==
The Tascam SX-1 digital audio recorder runs a heavily modified version of BeOS that will only launch the recording interface software. The RADAR 24, RADAR V and RADAR 6, hard disk-based, 24-track professional audio recorders from iZ Technology Corporation were based on BeOS 5. Magicbox, a manufacturer of signage and broadcast display machines, uses BeOS to power their Aavelin product line. Final Scratch, a 12-inch vinyl timecode record-driven DJ software and hardware system, was first developed on BeOS. The "ProFS" version was sold to a few dozen DJs prior to the 1.0 release, which ran on a Linux virtual partition.

=== Spiritual successors ===
Family tree of BeOS and related operating systems

After BeOS came to an end, Palm created PalmSource which used parts of BeOS's multimedia framework for its failed Palm OS Cobalt product (with the takeover of PalmSource, the BeOS rights were assigned to Access Co.). However, Palm refused the request of BeOS users to license the operating system. As a result, a few projects formed to recreate BeOS or its key elements with the eventual goal of then continuing where Be Inc. quit.

BeUnited, a BeOS oriented community, converted itself into a nonprofit organization in August 2001 to "define and promote open specifications for the delivery of the Open Standards BeOS-compatible Operating System (OSBOS) platform".

==== ZETA ====
Immediately after Palm's purchase of Be, a German company named yellowTAB started developing Zeta based on the BeOS R5.1 codebase and released it commercially. It was later distributed by magnussoft. During development by yellowTAB, the company received criticism from the BeOS community for refusing to discuss its legal position with regard to the BeOS codebase. Access Co. (which bought PalmSource, until then the holder of the intellectual property associated with BeOS) declared that yellowTAB had no right to distribute a modified version of BeOS, and magnussoft was forced to cease distribution of the operating system in 2007.

==== Haiku (OpenBeOS) ====
Haiku is a complete open source reimplementation of BeOS. It was originally named OpenBeOS and its first release in 2002 was a community update. Unlike Cosmoe and BlueEyedOS, it is directly compatible with BeOS applications. As of 2026, it was the only BeOS clone still under development, with the sixth beta in August 2026 still keeping BeOS 5 compatibility in its x86 32-bit images, with an increased number of ported modern drivers and GTK apps.

==== Others ====
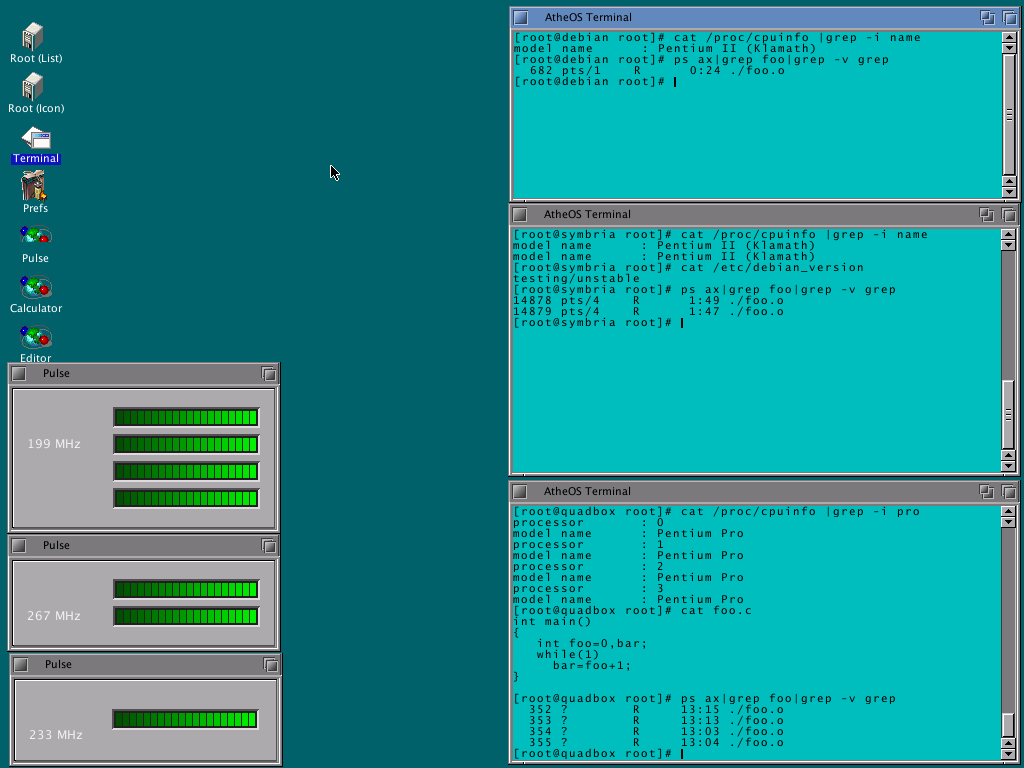
Screenshot of an early version of Cosmoe

BlueEyedOS tried to create a system under LGPL based on the Linux kernel and an X server that is compatible with BeOS. Work began under the name BlueOS in 2001 and a demo CD was released in 2003. The project was discontinued in February 2005.

Cosmoe, with an interface like BeOS, was designed by Bill Hayden as an open source operating system based on the source code of AtheOS and later OpenBeOS, but using the Linux kernel. ZevenOS was designed to continue where Cosmoe left off. In mid 2024, Cosmoe was resurrected by its original author after 17 years, with a much improved codebase based on contemporary Haiku.

BeFree started in 2003, initially developed under FreeBSD and later Linux.

VitruvianOS is another attempt to create BeOS look and feel on Linux kernel, started in 2018.

== Easter eggs ==
- Error messages in the standard NetPositive browser were written as haiku. The Haiku operating system, a free implementation of BeOS, was named in their honor.
- The BeOS developer toolkit included two functions that served no practical purpose and were added as a joke: is_computer_on() ("Returns 1 if the computer is on. If the computer isn't on, the value returned by this function is undefined.") and is_computer_on_fire() ("Returns the temperature of the motherboard if the computer is currently on fire. Smoldering doesn't count. If the computer isn't on fire, the function returns some other value."). These were faithfully recreated in Haiku.

== See also ==
- Access Co.
- BeIA
- Comparison of operating systems
- Gobe Productive
- Hitachi Flora Prius
