= ZETA (operating system) =

- Developer: yellowTAB / magnussoft
- OS family: BeOS
- Working state: Discontinued
- Source model: Closed source
- Latest release: 1.5 / February 28, 2007; 19 years ago
- Update method: Offline package
- Supported platforms: x86
- Kernel type: Modular microkernel
- License: Proprietary
- Official website: magnussoft ZETA

ZETA, earlier yellowTAB ZETA, was an operating system formerly developed by yellowTAB of Germany based on the Be Operating System developed by Be Inc.; because of yellowTAB's insolvency, ZETA was later being developed by an independent team of which little was known, and distributed by magnussoft. As of February 28, 2007 the current and last version of ZETA was 1.5.

On March 28, 2007, magnussoft announced that it has discontinued funding the development of ZETA by March 16, because the sales figures had fallen far short of the company's expectations, so that the project was no longer economically viable. A few days later, the company also stopped the distribution of ZETA in reaction to allegations that ZETA constituted an illegal unlicensed derivative of the BeOS source code and binaries.

== Development ==
ZETA was an effort to bring BeOS up to date, adding support for newer hardware, and features that had been introduced in other operating systems in the years since Be Incorporated ceased development in 2001. Among the new features were USB 2.0 support, SATA support, samba support, a new media player, and enhanced localization of system components. Unlike Haiku and other open source efforts to recreate some or all of BeOS's functionality from scratch, ZETA was based on the actual BeOS code base, and it is closed source.

ZETA contributed to an increase in activity in the BeOS commercial software market, with a number of new products for both ZETA and the earlier BeOS being released.

However, some critics point to a list of goals for the first release that do not appear to have been met (including Java 1.4.2 and ODBC support). Other reviewers point to bugs that still exist from BeOS, and question whether yellowTAB has the complete access to the source code they would need to make significant updates.

Some changes that were made could break compilation of code, and in some cases (most notably Mozilla), break the actual application if any code optimizations are applied, resulting in much slower builds.

YellowTAB promoted ZETA mainly in the German market, where it used to be sold through infomercials and on RTL Shop, and in Japan still being a beta version. Prior to Magnussoft stopping the distribution of ZETA, it was mainly distributed directly by magnussoft.

== Versions ==
Zeta version	Release date	Description
Release Candidates RC1-RC4	October 15, 2004	The operating system ZETA was published before the appearance of the final version 1,0 as Release Candidates (RC). The release began with RC1, and the following RC2 showed clear development progress since BeOS R5 was on the market. Among other things new hardware was supported, as well as USB devices. Starting from June 9, 2004, the third release Candidate of the system was available. On 15 October 2004 the fourth release candidate appeared under the name Neo. This brought among other things a better hardware support by more drivers and a new Media Player.
Zeta 1.0	June 24, 2005	ZETA 1.0 became the final version of the operating system and presented at CeBIT (10. - 16. March 2005 in Hanover). ZETA has, like Windows XP, for the first time, a product activation. One gets a registration key by post and must afterwards enter these and the CD serial number in a window under ZETA, so that one may use it further. Starting from 24 June ZETA 1.0 was in the distribution; on the company-owned Website the spreading of the version 1.0 was officially confirmed on 1 July 2005.
Zeta 1.1	October 17, 2005	On 17 October 2005 a substantial update was released, bumping the version number to 1.1. With this new version it is possible to boot ZETA from a USB drive as well as a normal hard drive install. This release of ZETA also supports dual core processors.
Zeta 1.2	April 22, 2006	Briefly after the publication of the insolvency request from April 2006, the manufacturer released version 1.2. On 22 April, RTL Shop became a selling partner. This version brings some innovations, such as full SATA support and a Yahoo! Messenger is available.
Zeta 1.21		Based on the product information from magnussoft, ZETA 1.21 a minor upgrade to ZETA 1.2. This is also the first version of the product to be labeled "magnussoft ZETA" and to be sold by magnussoft. This version included the MakeMe IDE Since September 7, 2006, magnussoft is taking pre-orders of ZETA 1.21; on September 25, 2006, a downloadable Live CD of ZETA 1.21 was released. Existing ZETA users are able to upgrade by ordering an upgrade CD for 10 euros. It is not known whether magnussoft will provide updates to 1.21 via software download. According to an interview with Rene Weinert of magnussoft, magnussoft owns only the rights to sell ZETA, and development is being done by an independent developing team which includes Mr. Bernd Korz (the former CEO of the now bankrupt yellowTAB). This confirms that, contrary to the widespread belief, prior to this interview, ZETA is not being developed by magnussoft, but by an independent development team, of which little is known so far.
Zeta 1.5	February 28, 2007	The version included Samba-Client / WilmaCon, AudioTagger, PeopleEditor, multi-user support, Intel Extreme x9xx support and other drivers and fixes. It was announced an upgrade to R1.21 only, and began shipping February 28, 2007. On April 5, 2007, distribution was discontinued.
Zeta 1.5 Service Pack 1	March 2007	A "Release Candidate" service pack made available for a very limited time on the www.zeta-os.com website, for around one month prior to the web domain expiring. The text on the website at the time was a very limited farewell message in plain text, and a hyperlink to "Zeta1.51.zpkg". This can be found on archive websites, and provided improvements to user switching among other undocumented changes. This service pack is buggy in places.

== Differences between Zeta and BeOS ==
- The Bone network stack is built into the kernel (in BeOS R5, networking was implemented as an OS server).
- Localisation into other languages, primarily German (BeOS was English-only).
- Support for window decorations ("skins"). Windows, MacOS classic, and other windows were emulated.
- Drivers and patches for new hardware (SATA, processors, memory). The system now runs on modern computers.
- Support for icon previews for images in the rewritten Tracker.
- SVG support.

yellowTab did not want to break compatibility with previous versions of BeOS, which it partially succeeded in doing, but there is no backward compatibility: programmes created for Zeta do not run under BeOS.

== Criticism ==
ZETA and yellowTAB have been surrounded by controversy. Critics of yellowTAB questioned for a long time the legality of ZETA, and whether yellowTAB had legal access to the sources of BeOS; it is now known that yellowTAB could not have developed ZETA to the extent that they did without access to the source code, but doubts remain as to whether yellowTAB actually had legal access to the code or not.

Furthermore, critics did not see ZETA as real advancement of BeOS, but rather as an unfinished and buggy operating system loaded with third-party applications that were either obsolete, unsupported, or non-functional. This was particularly true in the initial releases of ZETA, and it was in clear conflict with the attention to detail that BeOS used to stand for, disappointing the BeOS community who at one point had high expectations for ZETA. While yellowTAB did clean up the selection of bundled applications in following versions, ZETA remains somewhat unstable when compared to other modern desktop operating systems.

But perhaps the most criticized practice by yellowTAB was its tendency to make claims that turned out to be either half truths or vague enough that they could not be confirmed. Not only did yellowTAB announce certain developments that never materialized (such as Java, and ODBC among others), but it would also support certain capabilities beyond what ZETA was actually capable of (e.g., compatibility with MS Office). According to sources close to yellowTAB, this is believed to have led to a high return rate from customers that bought ZETA from the German RTL TV shopping channel, and the reason for which RTL eventually stopped selling the product.

There was some criticism within the greater BeOS community regarding the lack of a "personal" edition of Zeta. This is a somewhat controversial standpoint, given the history of BeOS and Be Inc. Throughout the life of the Intel version of BeOS, Be Inc regularly created and distributed BeOS demo discs on CD. The discs were somewhat crippled and would not mount a BFS partition nor would they install to a physical hard drive. They served as a test for hardware support and a taster for the operating system. Zeta was offered in a similar way – demo discs with similar limitations were made available. Unfortunately, many in the BeOS community, especially those who came to BeOS post the demise of Be Inc, tended to have an issue with the "crippled" demo discs. The controversy is as follows: the final commercial release of BeOS, Revision 5, included a freely distributable "virtual" BeOS installation. The installer created a virtual BeOS image in a file on the host OS, and the computer could then boot into BeOS using a boot disk or via the installation of Bootman (the native BeOS boot manager.) Be Inc intended this release to be a taster and to draw users into buying the Professional edition, which was fully installable to a physical hard drive partition. Unfortunately, many users discovered that it was a trivial task to install the personal version to a real partition, and so Be Inc ultimately lost much of the sales potential for the product. Both YellowTab and Magnussoft learnt from this, and therefore did not offer a version of Zeta that could be installed without purchasing a license.

German language – the Zeta initial builds and much of the packaging was geared towards a German-speaking audience. This was reduced in later versions, but the first few beta releases and release candidates had many oddities where Zeta would fall back to German, no matter what locale was set.

Version 1.0 of Zeta included a badly thought out activation component, which requires a code to be entered and authenticated via a remote server before the nag screen will stop and full functionality is restored. The nag is fairly easily circumvented by replacing the executable called with a stub executable, but the activation was incredibly poorly executed and often failed. The activation was removed by the 1.21 release.

Zeta had no legal rights to distribute the BeOS software, much less open source any of it, as the rumours had it.
[...]
The main reason that there hasn't been a public statement previously is that dealing with this matter legally, in Germany, is an expensive undertaking and--given the apparently small amount of funding behind Zeta in its various incarnations--we'd only be in a position to spend significant money and legal time to make a point.
[...]
We have sent "cease and desist" letters to YellowTab on a number of occasions, which have been uniformly ignored. If Herr Korz [Bernd Korz, Former CEO of yellowTAB] feels that he holds a legitimate license to the BeOS code he's been using, we're completely unaware of it, and I'd be fascinated to see him produce any substantiation for that claim.

— David Schlesinger, Director, Open Source Technologies. ACCESS Co., Ltd., Access 'Completely Unaware' of Legitimate Zeta License

== Cease of distribution ==
A cease of distribution letter was posted by Magnussoft on 5 April 2007.

== See also ==
- Comparison of operating systems
