= Haiku (operating system) =

Computer operating system

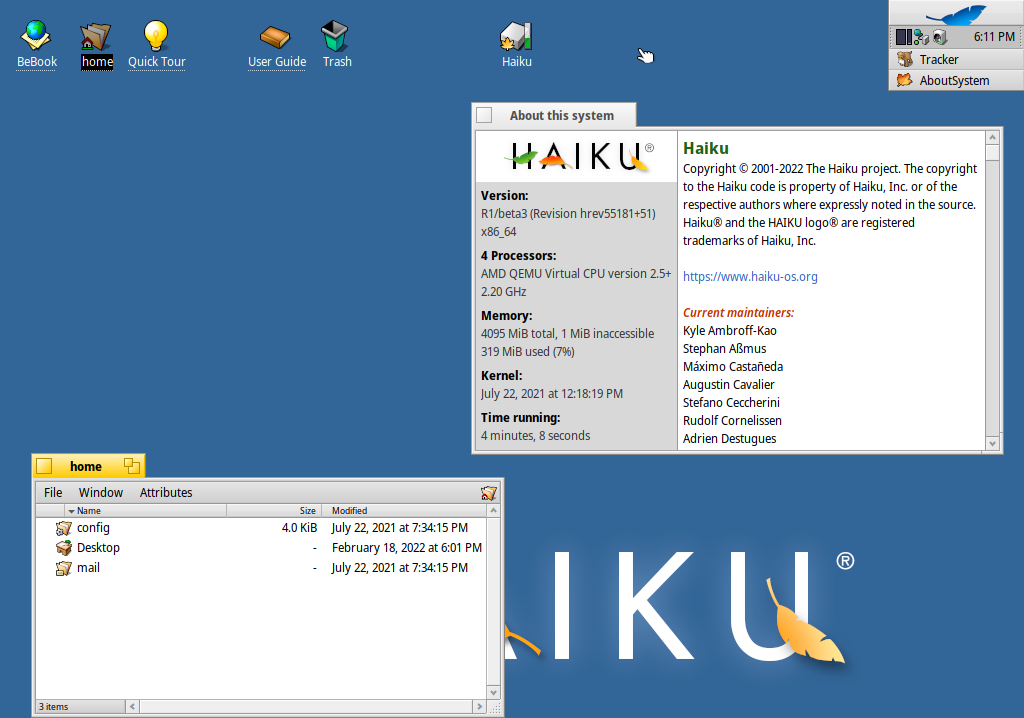
- Screenshot of Haiku (Beta 3)
- Developer: Community contributors and Haiku, Inc.
- Written in: C, C++
- OS family: BeOS
- Working state: Beta
- Source model: Open source
- Initial release: February 15, 2002; 24 years ago
- Latest preview: R1 Beta 6 / August 26, 2026; 2 months ago
- Repository: git.haiku-os.org
- Available in: Multilingual
- Update method: Software Updater and pkgman
- Package manager: hpkg
- Supported platforms: IA-32, x86-64, ARMv7, ARM64 RISC-V
- Kernel type: Hybrid
- Default user interface: OpenTracker
- License: MIT License and Be Sample Code License
- Official website: www.haiku-os.org

Haiku, originally OpenBeOS, is a free and open-source operating system for personal computers. It is a community-driven continuation of BeOS and aims to be binary-compatible with it, but is largely a reimplementation with the exception of certain components like the Deskbar. The Haiku project began in 2001, supported by the nonprofit Haiku Inc., and the operating system remains in beta.

== History and project ==
On 17 August 2001 Palm, Inc. announced the purchase of Be, Inc., marking the end of BeOS development. The day after, Michael Phipps started the OpenBeOS project to support the BeOS user community by creating an open-source, backward-compatible replacement for BeOS. Palm refused to license the BeOS code to a third-party, meaning that OpenBeOS had to be reverse-engineered. In 2003, Phipps founded the non-profit organization Haiku, Inc. in Rochester, New York, United States, to financially support development.

In 2004, the project held its first North American developers' conference, WalterCon; it was also announced on this day that OpenBeOS was renamed to Haiku to avoid infringing on Palm's trademarks. The BeUnited.org nonprofit organization, which promoted open standards for BeOS-compatible operating system projects, announced that Haiku would be its "reference platform". In February 2007, the project held a Tech Talk at Googleplex, attended by ex-Be engineers as well as Jean-Louis Gassée who voiced his support for the project. There is also an annual conference, BeGeistert, held in Germany since 1998 when BeOS was active.

== Development ==
Apart from the graphical user interface (Tracker and Deskbar, which were open sourced with BeOS 5), Haiku is original software. The modular design of BeOS allowed individual components of Haiku to initially be developed in teams in relative isolation, in many cases developing them as replacements for the BeOS components prior to the completion of other parts of the operating system.

The first project by OpenBeOS was a community-created "stop-gap" update for BeOS 5.0.3 in 2002, featuring open source replacement for some BeOS components. The kernel of NewOS, for x86, SuperH, and PowerPC architectures, was successfully forked that same year, and Haiku has been based on it since. The app_server window manager was completed in 2005. In July 2006, Haiku developer Stephan Aßmus introduced Icon-O-Matic, an icon editor, and a storage format (HVIF) with a rendering engine based on Anti-Grain Geometry. The PackageInstaller was created by Łukasz Zemczak at the 2007 Google Summer of Code.

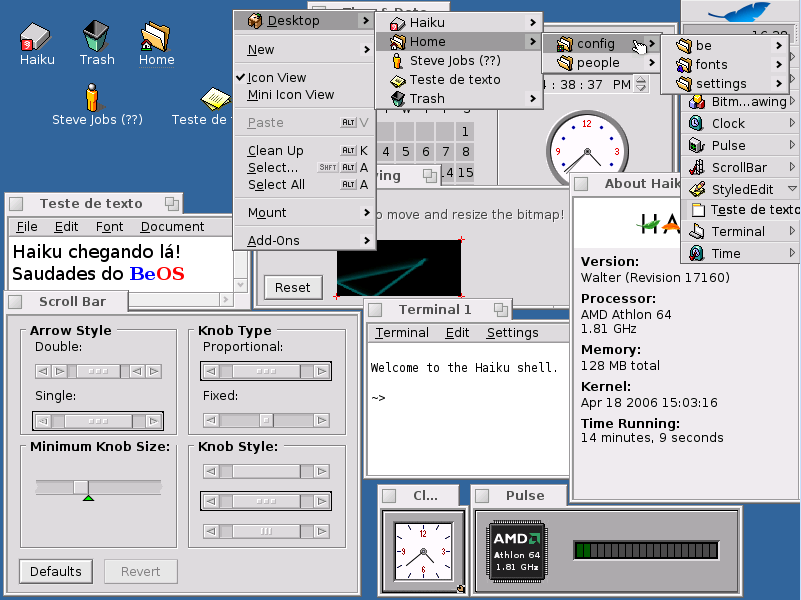
A pre-alpha build of Haiku from 2006, showing its then-codename Walter

Java support was eventually added by a team from BeUnited who had ported it to BeOS, followed by WLAN from the FreeBSD stack. Alongside a port to GCC4, the first alpha release finally arrived after seven years of development. Initially targeting full BeOS 5 compatibility, a community poll was launched to redefine the future of Haiku beyond a free software refactoring of BeOS from the late 1990s. It was decided to add support for contemporary systems, protocols, hardware, web standards, and compatibility with FLOSS libraries. On October 27, 2009, Haiku obtained Qt4 support.

The WebPositive browser was first preloaded with Alpha2, replacing BeZillaBrowser. After this, much time was spent on building a package management system, which went live in September 2013. Beta1 arrived in 2018, and one of the most notable new features was the PackageFS and package installation through the HaikuDepot and pkgman; Beta1 was the first official Haiku release to support full package management.

Wine was first ported to Haiku in 2022.

=== Release history ===
| Version | Release date | OS name | Architecture |
|---|---|---|---|
| Haiku R1/Alpha1 | 2009-09-14 | hrev33109 | IA-32 |
| Haiku R1/Alpha2 | 2010-05-10 | hrev36769 | IA-32 |
| Haiku R1/Alpha3 | 2011-06-20 | hrev42211 | IA-32 |
| Haiku R1/Alpha4 | 2012-11-11 | hrev44702 | IA-32, X86-64 |
| Haiku R1/Beta1 | 2018-09-28 | hrev52295 | IA-32, X86-64 |
| Haiku R1/Beta2 | 2020-06-09 | hrev54154 | IA-32, X86-64 |
| Haiku R1/Beta3 | 2021-07-26 | hrev55182 | IA-32, X86-64 |
| Haiku R1/Beta4 | 2022-12-23 | hrev56578 | IA-32, X86-64 |
| Haiku R1/Beta5 | 2024-09-13 | hrev57937 | IA-32, X86-64 |
| Haiku R1/Beta6 | 2026-08-26 | hrev59866 | IA-32, X86-64 |
Legend: Unsupported Preview version

== Architecture ==
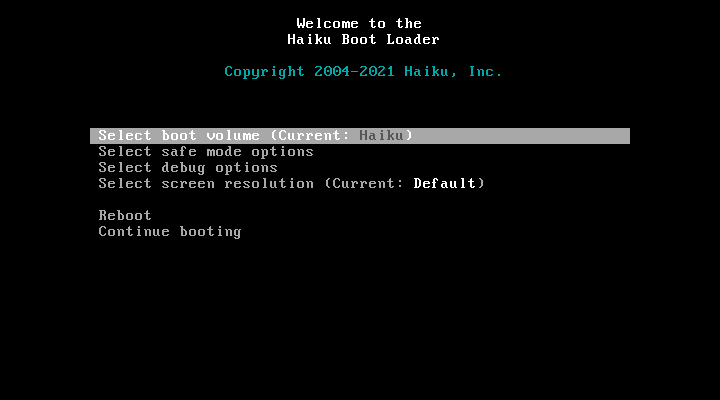
Haiku Boot Loader (formerly BootMan)

As with BeOS, Haiku is written in C++ and provides an object-oriented API. The Haiku kernel is a modular hybrid kernel that began as a fork of NewOS, a modular monokernel written by former Be Inc. engineer Travis Geiselbrecht. Many features have been implemented, including a virtual file system (VFS) layer and symmetric multiprocessing (SMP) support. It runs on 32-bit and 64-bit x86 processors, and has been ported to RISC-V; there is also a port for ARM under development, but is currently far behind the x86 port.

The application program interface (API) is based on that of BeOS, which is divided into a number of "kits" that collect related classes together and bear some relation to the library, which contains the supporting code. In 2007, Access Co Ltd, the owners of Be, Inc's intellectual property, released the text of this (BeBook) under a Creative Commons licence. The boot loader is filesystem agnostic and can also chainload GRUB, LILO and NTLDR.

Since the Beta1 release, Haiku's memory management includes ASLR, DEP, and SMAP.

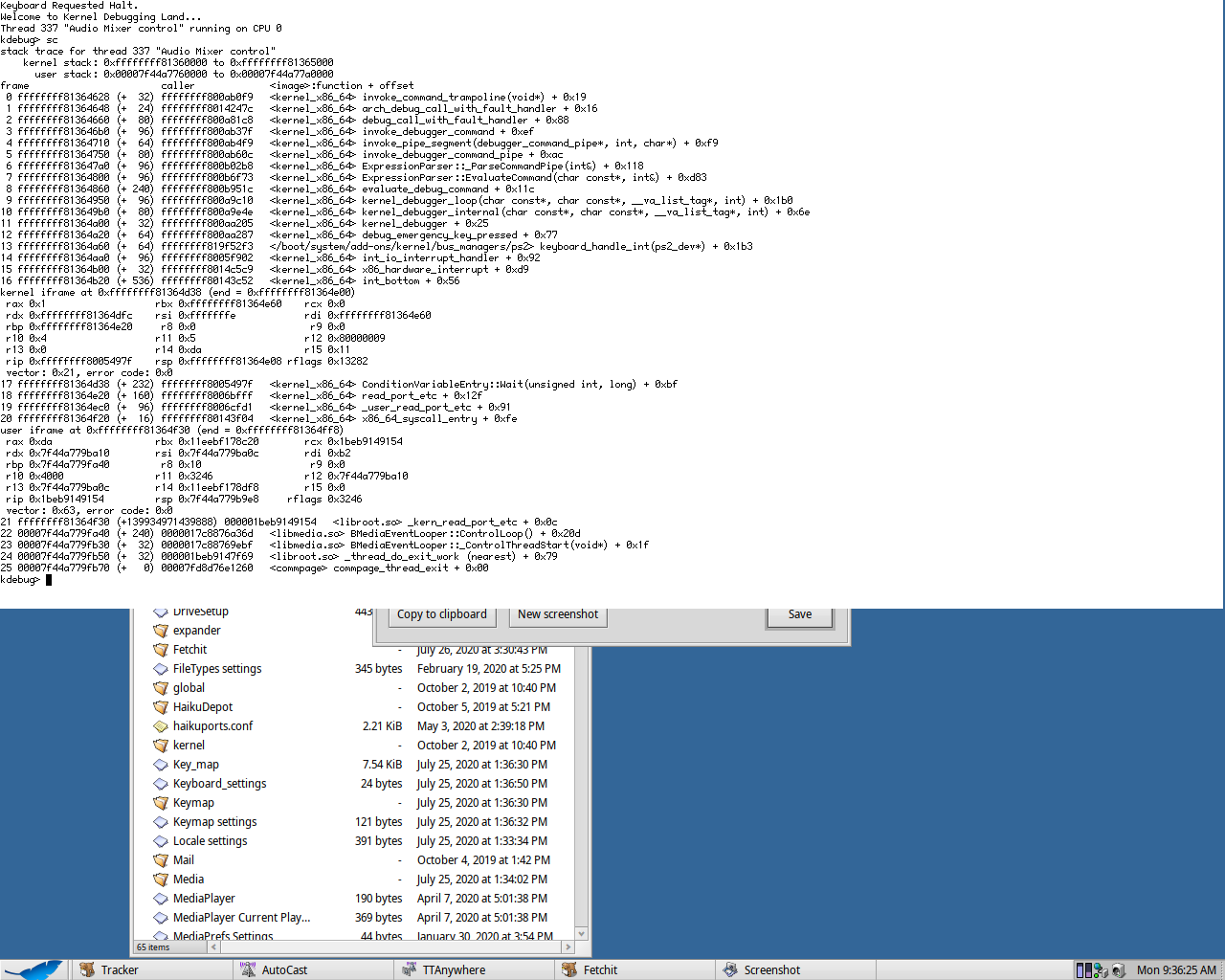
A KDL (Kernel Debugging Land) screen, displaying a requested halt that causes Haiku to drop into the kernel debugger

Graphics operations and window management is handled by the app_server protocol. VESA is used as a fallback video output mode. Haiku is POSIX compatible and has translation layers for X11 and Wayland.

== User interface ==
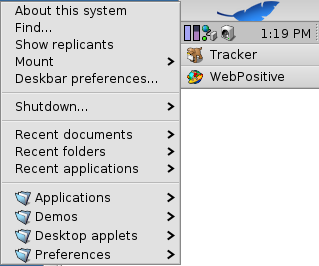
The Deskbar

The graphical user interface is formed of Tracker, a file manager, and the Deskbar, an always-on-top taskbar that is placed in the upper right corner of the screen containing a menu, tray, and a list of running programs. Tracker is an evolution from OpenTracker, which was released under a license with two addenda restricting the use of Be Inc. trademarks; Zeta also modified OpenTracker on their own operating system.

The icons in Haiku are named stippi and were designed by Stephan Aßmus. Aßmus also created the Haiku Vector Icon Format (HVIF), a vector storage format to store icons in Haiku, and is aimed at fast rendering and small file sizes.

== Software ==
Package management is done by the graphical application HaikuDepot, and a command-line equivalent called pkgman. Packages can also be activated by installing them from remote repositories with pkgman, or dropping them over a special packages directory. Haiku package management mounts activated packages over a read-only system directory. The Haiku package management system performs dependency solving with libsolv from the openSUSE project.

It comes with a number of preloaded applications, such as a WebKit-based web browser WebPositive, a document reader BePDF, a simple web server PoorMan, text editors Pe and StyledEdit, an IRC client Vision, and a Bash-based terminal emulator Terminal.

=== Compatibility with BeOS ===
Haiku R1 aims to be compatible with BeOS 5 at both the source and binary level, allowing software written and compiled for BeOS to be compiled and run without modification on Haiku. The 64-bit version of Haiku, however, does not have BeOS compatibility at the binary level, but the API still does. (The same would apply to other non-IA32 ports, such as RISC-V.) Installation of these PKG format files are done using the PackageInstaller.

== Reception ==
In 2013 after the release of Haiku Alpha 4, Ars Technica reviewed the operating system and praised it for being fast, but ultimately stating that it "may not be much more than an interesting diversion, something to play with on a spare bit of hardware". Haiku Beta 4 was reviewed by ZDNET in 2023 where it stated: "Haiku is for those who experienced either NeXT or AfterStep and want an operating system that looks and feels a bit old school but performs faster than any OS they've ever experienced." It further praised Haiku's kernel, file system, and object-oriented API.

As of 2018, the Free Software Foundation has included Haiku in a list of non-endorsed operating systems because: "Haiku includes some software that you're not allowed to modify. It also includes nonfree firmware blobs."

== See also ==
- Comparison of operating systems
- List of BeOS applications
- Syllable Desktop
